= Politics of Molise =

The politics of Molise, a region of Italy, takes place in the framework of an "anomalous presidential" representative democracy or prime-ministerial system with an executive presidency, whereby the president of regional government is the head of government, and of a pluriform multi-party system. Executive power is exercised by the regional government. Legislative power is vested in both the government and the Regional Council.

== Executive branch ==
The regional government (Giunta Regionale) is presided by the president of the region (Presidente della Regione), who is elected for a five-year term, and is composed by the president and the ministers (Assessori), who are currently 8.

=== List of presidents ===
No.	President	Took office	Left office	Tenure	Political party	Legislature (Election)
Elected by the Regional Council (1970–2000)
1	Carlo Vitale (1930–1973)	1970	1973^{[†]}	2–3 years	Christian Democracy (DC)	I (1970)
2	Giustino D'Uva (1924–1984); 1st time	23 January 1973	16 June 1975	2 years, 144 days	Christian Democracy (DC)	I (1970)
3	Florindo D'Aimmo (1928–2013)	16 June 1975	30 March 1982	6 years, 287 days	Christian Democracy (DC)	II (1975)
3	Florindo D'Aimmo (1928–2013)	16 June 1975	30 March 1982	6 years, 287 days	Christian Democracy (DC)	III (1980)
(2)	Giustino D'Uva (1924–1984); 2nd time	30 March 1982	9 October 1984^{[†]}	2 years, 193 days	Christian Democracy (DC)	III (1980)
4	Ulderico Adolfo Colagiovanni (1917–1996)	5 November 1984	13 May 1985	189 days	Christian Democracy (DC)	III (1980)
5	Paolo Nuvoli (1935–2025)	13 May 1985	16 January 1988	2 years, 248 days	Christian Democracy (DC)	IV (1985)
6	Fernando Di Laura Frattura (1932–2015)	16 January 1988	27 July 1990	2 years, 192 days	Christian Democracy (DC)	IV (1985)
7	Enrico Santoro (born 1932)	27 July 1990	3 August 1992	2 years, 7 days	Christian Democracy (DC)	V (1990)
8	Luigi Di Bartolomeo (1943–2022)	3 August 1992	22 December 1993	1 year, 141 days	Christian Democracy (DC)	V (1990)
9	Giovanni Di Giandomenico (born 1941)	15 March 1994	7 June 1995	1 year, 84 days	Christian Democracy (DC)	V (1990)
10	Marcello Veneziale (born 1941); 1st time	7 June 1995	20 November 1998 (Note: Resigned after losing the majority in the Regional Council, which then elected the leader of the opposition Angelo Michele Iorio (FI) as the new President.)	3 years, 166 days	Democratic Party of the Left (PDS)	VI (1995)
11	Angelo Michele Iorio (born 1948); 1st time	20 November 1998	11 May 1999 (Note: Resigned after losing the majority in the Regional Council, which then re-elected the former President Marcello Veneziale to the office.)	172 days	Forza Italia (FI)	VI (1995)
(10)	Marcello Veneziale (born 1941); 2nd time	11 May 1999	20 May 2000	1 year, 9 days	Democrats of the Left (DS)	VI (1995)
Directly-elected presidents (2000–present)
12	Giovanni Di Stasi (born 1950)	20 May 2000	21 November 2001 (Note: In 2001, the Administrative Regional Court (Tribunale Amministrativo Regionale or TAR) found some irregularities in the 2000 election and ordered a recall election.)	1 year, 185 days	Democrats of the Left (DS)	VII (2000)
(11)	Angelo Michele Iorio (born 1948); 2nd time	21 November 2001	30 November 2006	11 years, 117 days	Forza Italia (FI) (2001–2009) The People of Freedom (PdL) (2009–2013)	VIII (2001)
(11)	Angelo Michele Iorio (born 1948); 2nd time	30 November 2006	15 November 2011	11 years, 117 days	Forza Italia (FI) (2001–2009) The People of Freedom (PdL) (2009–2013)	IX (2006)
(11)	Angelo Michele Iorio (born 1948); 2nd time	15 November 2011	18 March 2013 (Note: In 2012, the Administrative Regional Court (Tribunale Amministrativo Regionale or TAR) found some irregularities in the 2011 election and ordered a recall election.)	11 years, 117 days	Forza Italia (FI) (2001–2009) The People of Freedom (PdL) (2009–2013)	X (2011)
13	Paolo Di Laura Frattura (born 1962)	18 March 2013	8 May 2018	5 years, 51 days	Democratic Party (PD)	XI (2013)
14	Donato Toma (born 1957)	8 May 2018	6 July 2023	5 years, 59 days	Forza Italia (FI)	XII (2018)
15	Francesco Roberti (born 1967)	6 July 2023	Incumbent	3 years, 12 days	Forza Italia (FI)	XIII (2023)

^† Died in office

== Legislative branch ==
The Regional Council of Molise (Consiglio Regionale del Molise) is composed of 30 members. 24 councillors are elected in provincial constituencies by proportional representation using the largest remainder method with a Droop quota and open lists, while 6 councillors (elected in bloc) come from a "regional list", including the president-elect. One seat is reserved for the candidate who comes second. If a coalition wins more than 50% of the total seats in the council with PR, only 3 candidates from the regional list will be chosen and the number of those elected in provincial constituencies will be 26. If the winning coalition receives less than 40% of votes special seats are added to the council to ensure a large majority for the President's coalition.

The council is elected for a five-year term, but, if the president suffers a vote of no confidence, resigns or dies, under the simul stabunt, simul cadent clause introduced in 1999 (literally they will stand together or they will fall together), also the council is dissolved and a snap election is called.

=== Current composition ===
The Regional Council of Molise is currently composed of the following political groups:

Party	Seats	Status
Brothers of Italy (FdI)	4 / 21	In government
Forza Italia (FI)	3 / 21	In government
Democratic Party (PD)	3 / 21	In opposition
Us Moderates (NM)	2 / 21	In government
Molise We Want (McV)	2 / 21	In government
Five Star Movement (M5S)	2 / 21	In opposition
Lega	1 / 21	In government
Populars for Italy (PpI)	1 / 21	In government
Roberti for President (RP)	1 / 21	In government
Building Democracy (CD)	1 / 21	In opposition
Gravina for President (GP)	1 / 21	In opposition

By coalition:

Coalition	Seats	Status
Centre-right coalition	14 / 21	Government
Centre-left coalition	7 / 21	Opposition

== Local government ==
=== Provinces ===
Province	Inhabitants	President	Party	Election
Campobasso	223,871	Giuseppe Puchetti	Ind. (centre-left)	2023
Isernia	84,548	Daniele Saia	Italian Socialist Party	2023

=== Municipalities ===
Municipality	Inhabitants	Mayor	Party	Election
Campobasso	49,148	Marialuisa Forte	Ind. (centre-left)	2024
Isernia	21,654	Piero Castrataro	Ind. (centre-left)	2021

== Parties and elections ==
=== Latest regional election ===
25–26 June 2023 Molise regional election results
Candidates	Votes	%	Seats	Parties	Votes	%	Seats
Francesco Roberti	94,770	62.24	1				
Francesco Roberti	94,770	62.24	1	Brothers of Italy	26,649	18.85	4
Francesco Roberti	94,770	62.24	1	Forza Italia	16,924	11.97	3
Francesco Roberti	94,770	62.24	1	Molise we want	13,971	9.88	2
Francesco Roberti	94,770	62.24	1	Molise in Good Hands – Us Moderates	10,582	7.48	2
Francesco Roberti	94,770	62.24	1	Populars for Molise	9,666	6.84	1
Francesco Roberti	94,770	62.24	1	League	8,481	6.00	1
Francesco Roberti	94,770	62.24	1	Union of the Centre–DC–NDC	5,005	3.54	0
Francesco Roberti	94,770	62.24	1	Total	91,278	64.55	13
Roberto Gravina	55,308	36.32	1				
Roberto Gravina	55,308	36.32	1	Democratic Party	17,031	12.04	3
Roberto Gravina	55,308	36.32	1	Five Star Movement	10,044	7.10	2
Roberto Gravina	55,308	36.32	1	Building Democracy	8,105	5.73	1
Roberto Gravina	55,308	36.32	1	Greens and Left Alliance–Territorial Equity	6,742	4.77	0
Roberto Gravina	55,308	36.32	1	Gravina for President–Progress Molise	5,928	4.19	0
Roberto Gravina	55,308	36.32	1	Democratic and Socialist Molise	1,086	0.77	0
Roberto Gravina	55,308	36.32	1	Total	48,936	34.61	6
Emilio Izzo	2,191	1.44	0	I don't vote for the usual	1,197	0.85	0
Blank and invalid votes	4,912	3.13					
Total candidates	152,269	100.00	2	Total parties	141,411	100.00	19
Registered voters/turnout	327,805	47.95					
Source: Elezioni Molise 2023
