= Elections in Molise =

Elections in region of Italy

This page gathers the results of elections in Molise.

== Regional elections ==
=== Latest regional election ===
25–26 June 2023 Molise regional election results
Candidates	Votes	%	Seats	Parties	Votes	%	Seats
Francesco Roberti	94,770	62.24	1				
Francesco Roberti	94,770	62.24	1	Brothers of Italy	26,649	18.85	4
Francesco Roberti	94,770	62.24	1	Forza Italia	16,924	11.97	3
Francesco Roberti	94,770	62.24	1	Molise we want	13,971	9.88	2
Francesco Roberti	94,770	62.24	1	Molise in Good Hands – Us Moderates	10,582	7.48	2
Francesco Roberti	94,770	62.24	1	Populars for Molise	9,666	6.84	1
Francesco Roberti	94,770	62.24	1	League	8,481	6.00	1
Francesco Roberti	94,770	62.24	1	Union of the Centre–DC–NDC	5,005	3.54	0
Francesco Roberti	94,770	62.24	1	Total	91,278	64.55	13
Roberto Gravina	55,308	36.32	1				
Roberto Gravina	55,308	36.32	1	Democratic Party	17,031	12.04	3
Roberto Gravina	55,308	36.32	1	Five Star Movement	10,044	7.10	2
Roberto Gravina	55,308	36.32	1	Building Democracy	8,105	5.73	1
Roberto Gravina	55,308	36.32	1	Greens and Left Alliance–Territorial Equity	6,742	4.77	0
Roberto Gravina	55,308	36.32	1	Gravina for President–Progress Molise	5,928	4.19	0
Roberto Gravina	55,308	36.32	1	Democratic and Socialist Molise	1,086	0.77	0
Roberto Gravina	55,308	36.32	1	Total	48,936	34.61	6
Emilio Izzo	2,191	1.44	0	I don't vote for the usual	1,197	0.85	0
Blank and invalid votes	4,912	3.13					
Total candidates	152,269	100.00	2	Total parties	141,411	100.00	19
Registered voters/turnout	327,805	47.95					
Source: Elezioni Molise 2023

=== List of previous regional elections ===
- 1970 Molise regional election
- 1975 Molise regional election
- 1980 Molise regional election
- 1985 Molise regional election
- 1990 Molise regional election
- 1995 Molise regional election
- 2000 Molise regional election
- 2001 Molise regional election
- 2006 Molise regional election
- 2011 Molise regional election
- 2013 Molise regional election
- 2018 Molise regional election
