= Regional Council of Molise =

Legislative organ of Molise, Italy

- 13th Legislature

Type
- Type: Regional council Unicameral
- Established: 16 July 1970

Leadership
- President: Quintino Pallante, FdI since 24 July 2023

Structure
- Seats: 21
- Political groups: Government (14): FdI (4); FI (3); NM (2); McV (2); PpI (1); Lega (1); RP (1); Opposition (7): PD (3); M5S (2); CD (1); GP (1)
- Length of term: 5 years

Elections
- Voting system: Party-list semi-proportional representation with majority bonus D'Hondt method
- Last election: 25–26 June 2023
- Next election: No later than 26 June 2028

Meeting place
- Palazzo della Regione, Campobasso

Website
- Official website

The Regional Council of Molise (Italian: Consiglio Regionale del Molise) is the legislative assembly of Molise.

It was first elected in 1970, when the ordinary regions were instituted, on the basis of the Constitution of Italy of 1948.

== Composition ==
The Regional Council of Molise was originally composed of 30 regional councillors. Following the decree-law n. 138 of 13 August 2011, the number of regional councillors was reduced to 20, with an additional seat reserved for the President of the Region.

The Council is elected for a five-year term, but, if the President suffers a vote of no confidence, resigns or dies, under the simul stabunt vel simul cadent clause (introduced in 1999), also the Council will be dissolved and there will be a snap election.

=== Political groups (2023–2028) ===
The Regional Council of Molise is currently composed of the following political groups:

Party	Seats	Status
Brothers of Italy (FdI)	4 / 21	In government
Forza Italia (FI)	3 / 21	In government
Democratic Party (PD)	3 / 21	In opposition
Us Moderates (NM)	2 / 21	In government
Molise We Want (McV)	2 / 21	In government
Five Star Movement (M5S)	2 / 21	In opposition
Lega	1 / 21	In government
Populars for Italy (PpI)	1 / 21	In government
Roberti for President (RP)	1 / 21	In government
Building Democracy (CD)	1 / 21	In opposition
Gravina for President (GP)	1 / 21	In opposition

By coalition:

Coalition	Seats	Status
Centre-right coalition	14 / 21	Government
Centre-left coalition	7 / 21	Opposition

=== Historical composition ===
Election	DC	PCI	PSI	PLI	PRI	PSDI	MSI	Total
7 June 1970	16	5	3	2	1	2	1	30
15 June 1975	16	6	3	1	1	2	1	30
8 June 1980	17	5	3	1	1	2	1	30
12 May 1985	18	5	3	1	1	1	1	30
6 May 1990	19	4	4	-	1	1	1	30

Election	Majority	Opposition	Council	President of the Region
23 April 1995	Centre-left (The Olive Tree) 18 / 30	Centre-right (Pole for Freedoms) 12 / 30		Marcello Veneziale (1995–1998); Angelo Iorio (1998–1999); Marcello Veneziale (1999–2000)
16 April 2000	Centre-left (The Olive Tree) 18 / 30	Centre-right (House of Freedoms) 12 / 30		Giovanni Di Stasi (2000–2001)
11 November 2001 (snap election)	Centre-right (House of Freedoms) 18 / 30	Centre-left (The Olive Tree) 12 / 30		Angelo Michele Iorio (2001–2013)
5 November 2006	Centre-right (House of Freedoms) 18 / 30	Centre-left (The Union) 12 / 30		Angelo Michele Iorio (2001–2013)
16 October 2011	Centre-right 18 / 30	Centre-left 12 / 30		Angelo Michele Iorio (2001–2013)
24 February 2013 (snap election)	Centre-left 13 / 21	Centre-right 5 / 21 M5S 2 / 21 CD 1 / 21		Paolo Di Laura Frattura (2013–2018)
22 April 2018	Centre-right 13 / 21	M5S 6 / 21 PD 2 / 21		Donato Toma (2018–2023)
25 June 2023	Centre-right 14 / 21	Centre-left 7 / 21		Francesco Roberti (since 2023)

== Presidents ==
This is a list of the Presidents of the Regional Council (Italian: Presidenti del Consiglio regionale):

Name	Period		Regional Legislature
Florindo D'Aimmo (DC)	16 July 1970	14 July 1975	I (1970)
Ulderico Colagiovanni (DC)	14 July 1975	16 July 1980	II (1975)
Gabriele Veneziale (PSI)	16 July 1980	12 June 1985	III (1980)
Lelio Pallante (DC)	12 June 1985	5 January 1988	IV (1985)
Nunzio Ruta (DC)	5 January 1988	11 June 1990	IV (1985)
Fernando Di Laura Frattura (DC)	11 June 1990	26 February 1991	V (1990)
Nicola Iacobacci (DC)	26 February 1991	16 April 1991	V (1990)
Nicolino Colalillo (DC)	16 April 1991	29 May 1995	V (1990)
Antonio D'Ambrosio (PDS)	29 May 1995	9 December 1997	VI (1995)
Roberto Ruta (PPI)	9 December 1997	29 May 2000	VI (1995)
Rossana Di Pilla (Dem)	29 May 2000	17 December 2001	VII (2000)
Angiolina Fusco Perrella (AN)	17 December 2001	22 November 2006	VIII (2001)
Mario Pietracupa (UDC)	22 November 2006	26 June 2009	IX (2006)
Michele Picciano (PdL)	26 June 2009	5 December 2011	IX (2006)
Mario Pietracupa (UDC)	5 December 2011	9 April 2013	X (2011)
Vincenzo Niro (UDEUR)	9 April 2013	28 October 2015	XI (2013)
Vincenzo Cotugno (Ind)	28 October 2015	3 June 2018	XI (2013)
Salvatore Micone (UDC)	3 June 2018	24 July 2023	XII (2018)
Quintino Vincenzo Pallante (FdI)	24 July 2023	Incumbent	XIII (2023)

== See also ==
- Regional council
- Politics of Molise
- President of Molise
