= List of presidents of Molise =

The following is a complete list of presidents of Molise. Molise is a region of Southern Italy established in 1970. Prior to then, it was part of the region of Abruzzi e Molise.

Prior to the 1995 election, the president was not directly elected, and was routinely a member of the Christian Democracy (DC) party, the party which had dominated elections for the Regional Council of Molise (Italian: Consiglio Regionale del Molise) and across Italy since the establishment of the Italian Republic as of the 1946 election.

== List ==
No.	President	Took office	Left office	Tenure	Political party	Legislature (Election)
Elected by the Regional Council (1970–2000)
1	Carlo Vitale (1930–1973)	1970	1973^{[†]}	2–3 years	Christian Democracy (DC)	I (1970)
2	Giustino D'Uva (1924–1984); 1st time	23 January 1973	16 June 1975	2 years, 144 days	Christian Democracy (DC)	I (1970)
3	Florindo D'Aimmo (1928–2013)	16 June 1975	30 March 1982	6 years, 287 days	Christian Democracy (DC)	II (1975)
3	Florindo D'Aimmo (1928–2013)	16 June 1975	30 March 1982	6 years, 287 days	Christian Democracy (DC)	III (1980)
(2)	Giustino D'Uva (1924–1984); 2nd time	30 March 1982	9 October 1984^{[†]}	2 years, 193 days	Christian Democracy (DC)	III (1980)
4	Ulderico Adolfo Colagiovanni (1917–1996)	5 November 1984	13 May 1985	189 days	Christian Democracy (DC)	III (1980)
5	Paolo Nuvoli (1935–2025)	13 May 1985	16 January 1988	2 years, 248 days	Christian Democracy (DC)	IV (1985)
6	Fernando Di Laura Frattura (1932–2015)	16 January 1988	27 July 1990	2 years, 192 days	Christian Democracy (DC)	IV (1985)
7	Enrico Santoro (born 1932)	27 July 1990	3 August 1992	2 years, 7 days	Christian Democracy (DC)	V (1990)
8	Luigi Di Bartolomeo (1943–2022)	3 August 1992	22 December 1993	1 year, 141 days	Christian Democracy (DC)	V (1990)
9	Giovanni Di Giandomenico (born 1941)	15 March 1994	7 June 1995	1 year, 84 days	Christian Democracy (DC)	V (1990)
10	Marcello Veneziale (born 1941); 1st time	7 June 1995	20 November 1998 (Note: Resigned after losing the majority in the Regional Council, which then elected the leader of the opposition Angelo Michele Iorio (FI) as the new President.)	3 years, 166 days	Democratic Party of the Left (PDS)	VI (1995)
11	Angelo Michele Iorio (born 1948); 1st time	20 November 1998	11 May 1999 (Note: Resigned after losing the majority in the Regional Council, which then re-elected the former President Marcello Veneziale to the office.)	172 days	Forza Italia (FI)	VI (1995)
(10)	Marcello Veneziale (born 1941); 2nd time	11 May 1999	20 May 2000	1 year, 9 days	Democrats of the Left (DS)	VI (1995)
Directly-elected presidents (2000–present)
12	Giovanni Di Stasi (born 1950)	20 May 2000	21 November 2001 (Note: In 2001, the Administrative Regional Court (Tribunale Amministrativo Regionale or TAR) found some irregularities in the 2000 election and ordered a recall election.)	1 year, 185 days	Democrats of the Left (DS)	VII (2000)
(11)	Angelo Michele Iorio (born 1948); 2nd time	21 November 2001	30 November 2006	11 years, 117 days	Forza Italia (FI) (2001–2009) The People of Freedom (PdL) (2009–2013)	VIII (2001)
(11)	Angelo Michele Iorio (born 1948); 2nd time	30 November 2006	15 November 2011	11 years, 117 days	Forza Italia (FI) (2001–2009) The People of Freedom (PdL) (2009–2013)	IX (2006)
(11)	Angelo Michele Iorio (born 1948); 2nd time	15 November 2011	18 March 2013 (Note: In 2012, the Administrative Regional Court (Tribunale Amministrativo Regionale or TAR) found some irregularities in the 2011 election and ordered a recall election.)	11 years, 117 days	Forza Italia (FI) (2001–2009) The People of Freedom (PdL) (2009–2013)	X (2011)
13	Paolo Di Laura Frattura (born 1962)	18 March 2013	8 May 2018	5 years, 51 days	Democratic Party (PD)	XI (2013)
14	Donato Toma (born 1957)	8 May 2018	6 July 2023	5 years, 59 days	Forza Italia (FI)	XII (2018)
15	Francesco Roberti (born 1967)	6 July 2023	Incumbent	2 years, 356 days	Forza Italia (FI)	XIII (2023)

== Notes ==
^† Died in office
