= 2013 Italian regional elections =

Ballots for 7 of the 20 regional assemblies of Italy

← 2010	February–November 2013	2014 →

Presidents and regional assemblies of Lombardy, Lazio, Friuli-Venezia Giulia Basilicata and Molise. Regional assemblies of Aosta Valley and Trentino-Alto Adige/Südtirol.

A special round of regional elections in Italy took place in 2013 in seven of the country’s twenty regions, including Lazio, Lombardy and Molise (24 and 25 February), Basilicata (17 and 18 November), and three autonomous regions: Friuli-Venezia Giulia (21 and 22 April), Aosta Valley (26 May), Trentino-Alto Adige/Südtirol (27 October).

== Overview ==
The regional elections were held early in Lombardy, Lazio, Molise and Basilicata, after the respective presidents had resigned from office or the regional councils had been dissolved.

In Lombardy, the Regional Council was dissolved in October 2012 following the resignation of the majority of its members. In Lazio, the incumbent president Renata Polverini resigned in September 2012 after a scandal involving regional councillors, while in Basilicata president Vito De Filippo also resigned following a judicial investigation involving several members of his administration. In Molise the 2011 regional election was declared invalid.

== Overall results ==
=== Regional councils ===
Alliance	Votes	%	Seats
Centre-left coalition	3,711,668	40.10	127 / 257
Centre-right coalition	3,553,222	38.38	92 / 257
Five Star Movement	1,352,957	14.62	27 / 257
Others	637,486	6.89	11 / 257
Total	9,255,333	100	257 / 257

=== Presidents of the regions ===
Region	Election day	Outgoing			Elected		
Region	Election day	President	Party	Alliance	President	Party	Alliance
Lazio	24–25 February	Renata Polverini	PdL	Centre-right	Nicola Zingaretti	PD	Centre-left
Lombardy	24–25 February	Roberto Formigoni	PdL	Centre-right	Roberto Maroni	LN	Centre-right
Molise	24–25 February	Michele Iorio	PdL	Centre-right	Paolo Di Laura Frattura	PD	Centre-left
Friuli-Venezia Giulia	21–22 April	Renzo Tondo	PdL	Centre-right	Debora Serracchiani	PD	Centre-left
Aosta Valley	26 May	Augusto Rollandin	UV	UV–SA–FA	Augusto Rollandin	UV	UV–SA–FA
Trentino	27 October	Lorenzo Dellai	UpT	Centre-left	Ugo Rossi	PATT	Centre-left
South Tyrol	27 October	Luis Durnwalder	SVP	Centre-left	Arno Kompatscher	SVP	Centre-left
Basilicata	17–18 November	Vito De Filippo	PD	Centre-left	Marcello Pittella	PD	Centre-left

== Results by region ==
=== Lazio ===
President				Regional council			
Candidate	Party	Votes	%	Alliance	Votes	%	Seats
Nicola Zingaretti	PD	1,330,398	40.6	Centre-left	1,168,960	41.6	29
Francesco Storace	LD	959,683	29.3	Centre-right	920,861	32.8	13
Davide Barillari	M5S	661,865	20.2	M5S	467,249	16.6	7
Giulia Bongiorno	SC	154,986	4.7	SC	124,244	4.4	2
Others		165,810	5.2	Others	126,116	4.6	0
Voters: 3,423,284 — Turnout: 72.0%

=== Lombardy ===
President				Regional council			
Candidate	Party	Votes	%	Alliance	Votes	%	Seats
Roberto Maroni	LN	2,456,921	42.8	Centre-right	2,328,809	43.1	49
Umberto Ambrosoli	Ind	2,194,169	38.2	Centre-left	2,015,110	37.3	22
Silvana Carcano	M5S	782,007	13.6	M5S	775,211	14.3	9
Others		304,730	5.3	Others	287,625	5.4	0
Voters: 5,938,044 — Turnout: 76.7%

=== Molise ===
President				Regional council			
Candidate	Party	Votes	%	Alliance	Votes	%	Seats
Paolo di Laura Frattura	PD	85,881	44.7	Centre-left	84,141	50.1	13
Michele Iorio	FI	49,567	25.8	Centre-right	46,212	27.5	5
Antonio Federico	M5S	32,200	16.8	M5S	20,437	12.2	2
Massimo Romano	CD	21,160	11.0	CD	14,558	8.7	1
Others		3,299	1.7	Others	2,435	1.5	0
Voters: 204,859 — Turnout: 61.6%

=== Friuli-Venezia Giulia ===
President				Regional council			
Candidate	Party	Votes	%	Alliance	Votes	%	Seats
Debora Serracchiani	PD	211,508	39.4	Centre-left	155,547	39.0	27
Renzo Tondo	FI	209,457	39.0	Centre-right	180,626	45.2	17
Saverio Galluccio	M5S	103,135	19.2	M5S	54,952	13.8	5
Others		12,909	2.4	Others	8,231	2.1	0
Voters: 554,943 — Turnout: 50.5%

=== Trentino-Alto Adige/Südtirol ===
==== Trentino ====
President				Provincial council			
Candidate	Party	Votes	%	Alliance	Votes	%	Seats
Ugo Rossi	PATT	144,616	58.1	Centre-left	139,529	58.7	23
Diego Mosna	Ind	47,970	19.3	CpT	43,793	18.4	7
Maurizio Fugatti	LN	16,401	6.6	LN–CEU	15,315	6.5	2
Filippo Degasperi	M5S	14,241	5.7	M5S	13,889	5.9	2
Giacomo Bezzi	FI	10,631	4.3	FI	10,495	4.4	1
Others		14,994	6.0	Others	14,518	6.1	0
Voters: 248,853 — Turnout: 62.8%

=== Basilicata ===
President				Regional council			
Candidate	Party	Votes	%	Alliance	Votes	%	Seats
Marcello Pittella	PD	148,696	59.6	Centre-left	148,381	62.8	13
Salvatore Di Maggio	SC	48,370	19.4	Centre-right	50,904	21.5	5
Piernicola Pedicini	M5S	32,919	13.2	MS5	21,219	9.0	2
Maria Murante	SEL	12,888	5.2	SEL	12,204	5.2	1
Others		6,610	2.6	Others	3,762	1.5	0
Voters: 273,794 — Turnout: 47.6%
