= Giuseppe Caterina =

Italian politician (1943–2025)

Member of the Regional Council of Molise
- In office 28 November 2001 – 7 November 2006

Mayor of Isernia
- In office 29 June 1995 – 5 November 1998
- Preceded by: Marcello Veneziale
- In office 8 November 1999 – 12 November 2001
- Succeeded by: Gabriele Melogli

Personal details
- Born: 18 March 1943 Rotello, Province of Campobasso, Kingdom of Italy
- Died: 28 June 2025 (aged 82) Isernia, Molise, Italy
- Party: The Daisy

Giuseppe Caterina (18 March 1943 – 28 June 2025) was an Italian politician.

== Life and career ==
Caterina was born 18 March 1943 in Rotello, graduating in political science at the University of Urbino.

He made his political debut in the youth movement of the Christian Democrats, being elected to the municipal council in Rotello in 1970 and also holding the position of deputy mayor. An exponent of the "progressive" fringe of Catholics, he approached the Italian Communist Party as an independent, joining the Democratic Party of the Left. From 1993 to 1995, he was councillor for social policies in Isernia in the council chaired by Marcello Veneziale; at the time of the latter's election to the office of president of Molise, Caterina took over as mayor until the end of his mandate in 1998.

From 2001 to 2006, he was a regional councilor of Molise as a member of the Margherita.

Caterina died on 28 June 2025, at the age of 82.
