= Progressive People's Party (Molise) =

Progressive People's Party Partito Popolare Progressista
- Leader: Tonino Martino
- Founded: 1993
- Split from: Christian Democracy
- Headquarters: Campobasso
- Ideology: Christian democracy Popularism
- Political position: Centre to Centre-right

The Progressive People's Party of Christian Inspiration (Partito Popolare Progressista di Ispirazione Cristiana), also known as Progressive People's Party (Partito Popolare Progressista, shortened as PPP), was a Christian-democratic political party active in Molise. Its leader and founder was Tonino Martino.

== History ==
The party was founded in 1993 by the lawyer and Christian-democratic regional councillor of Molise Tonino Martino, disappointed by the proposals of the DC's National Secretary Mino Martinazzoli.

In the 1995 regional election the party ran within the centre-right coalition in support of the candidacy of Quintino Pallante obtaining the 2.96% of the vote and Martino was re-elected at the Regional Council.

In the 2000 regional election the party always ran within the centre-right coalition in support of Michele Iorio, obtaining the 2.18% of the vote and reconfirming its leader Martino at the Regional Council. Martino acted with a legal recourse against the outcome of election (ended with the victory of the centre-left candidate Giovanni Di Stasi) and in 2001 the TAR of Molise annulled the election for inherent vices, a sentence that was subsequently confirmed by the Council of State. The regional election was repeated in 2001 and this time the winner was Iorio. The PPP did not participate in this election.

In 2002 Martino was candidate with the PPP for the presidency of the province of Campobasso, obtaining the 2,23% of the vote and remaining excluded from the provincial council. This was the last electoral contest in which participated the party.

In 2013 the founder of the PPP Tonino Martino died.
