= 2023 Italian regional elections =

← 2020	February–October 2023	2024 →

Presidents and regional assemblies of Friuli-Venezia Giulia, Lazio, Lombardy and Molise. Provincial assemblies of Trentino-Alto Adige/Südtirol
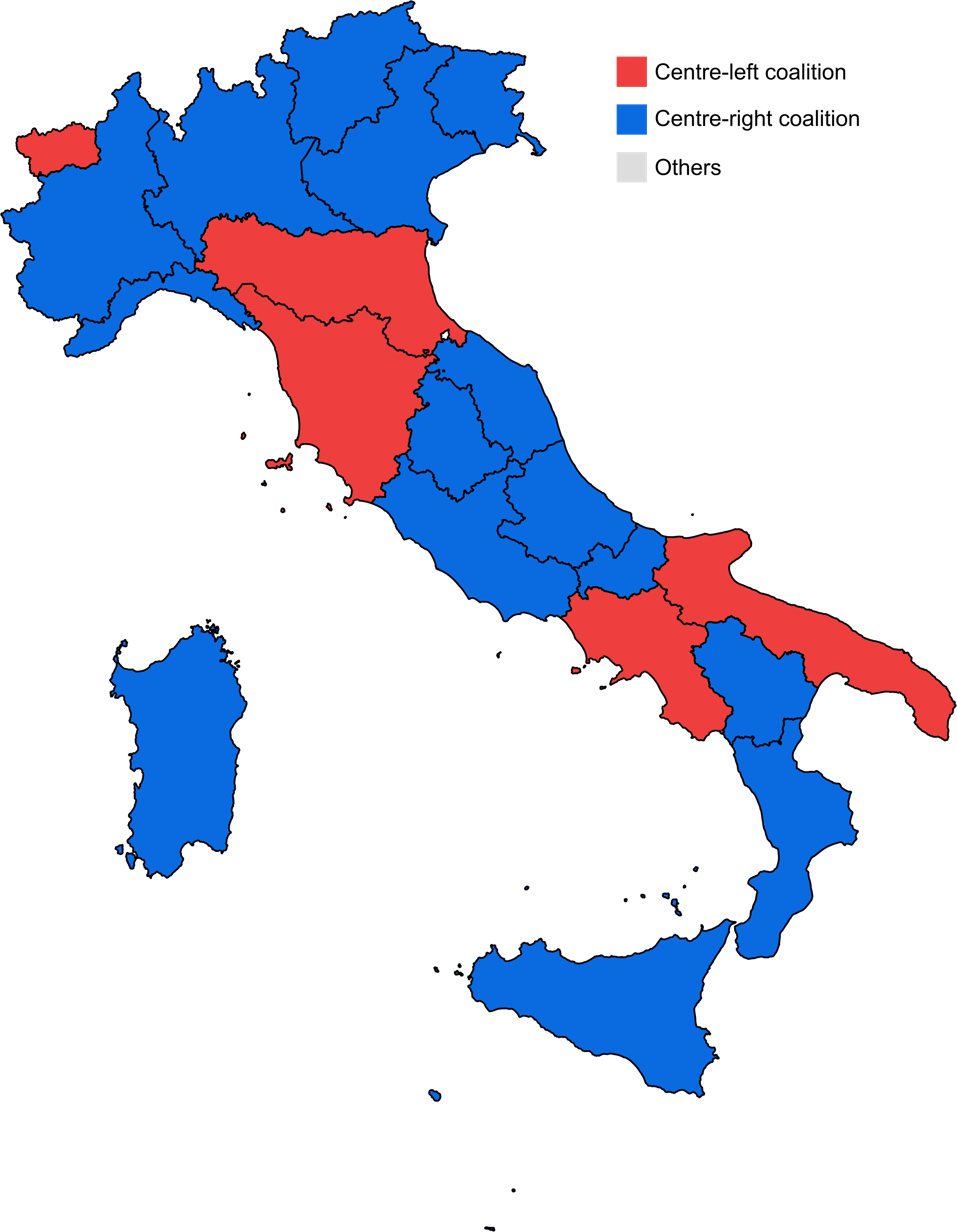
- Italian Regions by party of the ruling President after the elections.

A special round of regional elections in Italy took place in 2023 in five of the country’s twenty regions, including Lombardy and Lazio (12–13 February), Friuli-Venezia Giulia (2–3 April), Molise (25–26 June) and Trentino-Alto Adige/Südtirol (22 October).

== Overall results ==
=== Regional councils ===
Alliance	Votes	%	Seats
Centre-right coalition	2,941,124	56.60	144 / 235
Centre-left coalition	1,716,729	33.04	78 / 235
Others	537,973	10.36	13 / 235
Total	5,195,826	100	265 / 265

=== Presidents of the regions ===
Region	Election day	Outgoing			Elected		
Region	Election day	President	Party	Alliance	President	Party	Alliance
Lazio	12–13 February	Alessio D'Amato (acting)	PD	Centre-left	Francesco Rocca	Ind	Centre-right
Lombardy	12–13 February	Attilio Fontana	Lega	Centre-right	Attilio Fontana	Lega	Centre-right
Friuli-Venezia Giulia	2–3 April	Massimiliano Fedriga	Lega	Centre-right	Massimiliano Fedriga	Lega	Centre-right
Molise	25–26 June	Donato Toma	FI	Centre-right	Francesco Roberti	FI	Centre-right
Trentino	22 October	Maurizio Fugatti	Lega	Centre-right	Maurizio Fugatti	Lega	Centre-right
South Tyrol	22 October	Arno Kompatscher	SVP	Centre-right	Arno Kompatscher	SVP	Centre-right

== Summary by region ==
=== Lazio ===
President				Regional council			
Candidate	Party	Votes	%	Alliance	Votes	%	Seats
Francesco Rocca	Ind	934,614	53.9	Centre-right	855,450	55.3	31
Alessio D'Amato	PD	581,974	34.5	Centre-left	519,561	33.6	15
Donatella Bianchi	M5S	186,860	10.8	M5S	151,027	9.8	5
Others		32,263	0.8	Others	20,534	1.3	0
Voters: 1,782,656 — Turnout: 37.2%

=== Lombardy ===
President				Regional council			
Candidate	Party	Votes	%	Alliance	Votes	%	Seats
Attilio Fontana	Lega	1,774,482	54.7	Centre-right	1,621,095	56.3	49
Pierfrancesco Majorino	PD	1,101,410	33.9	Centre-left	945,148	32.8	24
Letizia Moratti	Ind	320,249	9.9	A–IV	275,008	9.5	7
Others		49,513	1.5	Others	39,913	1.4	0
Voters: 3,339,019 — Turnout: 41.7%

=== Friuli-Venezia Giulia ===
President				Regional council			
Candidate	Party	Votes	%	Alliance	Votes	%	Seats
Massimiliano Fedriga	Lega	314,824	64.2	Centre-right	250,773	63.5	29
Massimo Moretuzzo	PpA	139,008	28.4	Centre-left	117,410	29.7	19
Others		36,226	7.4	Others	26,557	7.8	0
Voters: 502,077 — Turnout: 45.3%

=== Molise ===
President				Regional council			
Candidate	Party	Votes	%	Alliance	Votes	%	Seats
Francesco Roberti	FI	94,770	62.2	Centre-right	91,278	64.6	14
Roberto Gravina	M5S	55,308	36.3	Centre-left	48,936	34.6	7
Others		2,191	1.5	Others	1,197	0.8	0
Voters: 157,181 — Turnout: 47.9%

=== Trentino-Alto Adige/Südtirol ===
Trentino

President				Provincial council			
Candidate	Party	Votes	%	Alliance	Votes	%	Seats
Maurizio Fugatti	Lega	129,758	51.8	Centre-right	122,383	52.6	21
Francesco Valduga	PD	93,893	37.5	Centre-left	86,102	37.0	13
Filippo Degasperi	Ind	9,534	3.8	UP	8,155	3.5	1
Others		17,210	6.9	Others	15,849	6.9	0
Voters: 258,055 — Turnout: 58.4%

South Tyrol

== See also ==
- Elections in Italy
