= Franco Ciampitti =

Italian writer

- Born: 1903; Isernia, Italy
- Died: 1988 (aged 84–85); Isernia, Italy
- Occupation: Writer

Franco Ciampitti (1903–1988) was an Italian writer. His work was part of the literature event in the art competition at the 1936 Summer Olympics.

== Biography ==
He was born in Isernia, to Giovanni Ciampitti, a lawyer and senator of the Republic. As a law student at the University “Federico II” of Naples, he approached the world of sports journalism, becoming a correspondent for Felice Scandone's Il Mezzogiorno Sportivo. In 1931 he won a competition for sports storytellers held by the F.I.G.C. with the novel Io cammino e arriverò, later published as Novantesimo minuto (Ninetieth Minute), for the La Gazzetta dello Sport in 1932. Novantesimo minuto is, arguably, the first Italian narrative work that has the world of soccer as its subject.

In the following two years he followed Vittorio Pozzo's Italian national soccer team as a correspondent. His second novel (Circles, published by Carabba in 1934) was chosen to represent Italian fiction at the games of the 1936 Summer Olympics in Berlin. From this experience he would draw material for Champions of the World, an unpublished collection of profiles of sportsmen. In 1934 he was with Giovanni Titta Rosa the editor of the volume Prima antologia degli scrittori sportivi, also published by Carabba, in which his writings also appear.

In 1940 he published a reportage on the Winter War war entitled Red Snow in Finland for the Milan publishing house La Prora.

After World War II, he practiced law in Isernia and was president of the Provincial Tourist Board.

He returned to fiction with Il Tratturo (L'Arte Tipografica, Naples, 1968).
