= Ilaria Cavo =

Italian politician (born 1973)

Member of the Chamber of Deputies
- Incumbent
- Assumed office 13 October 2022
- Constituency: Liguria – U02

Personal details
- Born: 11 October 1973 (age 52)
- Party: Us Moderates (since 2022)

Ilaria Cavo (born 11 October 1973) is an Italian politician serving as a member of the Chamber of Deputies since 2022. She has served as president of the national council of Us Moderates since 2025.
