= List of mayors of Isernia =

Mayor of Isernia
- Sindaco di Isernia
- Incumbent; Piero Castrataro since 19 October 2021
- Appointer: Popular election
- Term length: 5 years, renewable once
- Website: Official website

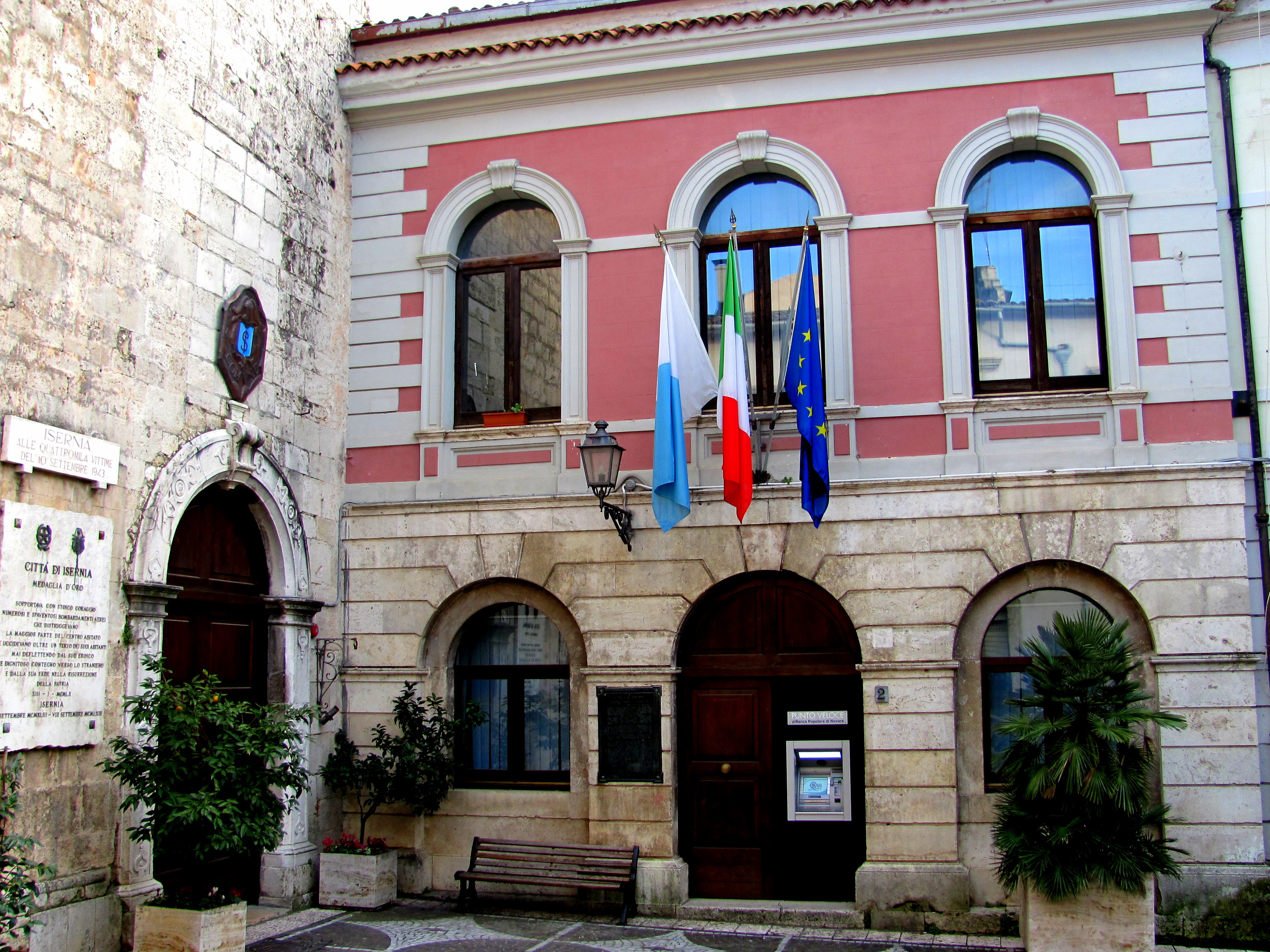
Isernia's Town Hall.

The mayor of Isernia is an elected politician who, along with the Isernia City Council, is accountable for the strategic government of Isernia in Molise, Italy.

The current mayor is Piero Castrataro, supported by the centre-left coalition, who took office on 19 October 2021.

== Overview ==
According to the Italian Constitution, the mayor of Isernia is member of the City Council.

The mayor is elected by the population of Isernia, who also elect the members of the City Council, controlling the mayor's policy guidelines and is able to enforce his resignation by a motion of no confidence. The mayor is entitled to appoint and release the members of his government.

Since 1998 the mayor is elected directly by Isernia's electorate: in all mayoral elections in Italy in cities with a population higher than 15,000 the voters express a direct choice for the mayor or an indirect choice voting for the party of the candidate's coalition. If no candidate receives at least 50% of votes, the top two candidates go to a second round after two weeks. The election of the City Council is based on a direct choice for the candidate with a preference vote: the candidate with the majority of the preferences is elected. The number of the seats for each party is determined proportionally.

Notably, the 2012 election resulted in an anatra zoppa case: the centre-left candidate Ugo De Vivo won the runoff with 57.37% of the vote, however, the lists supporting him only received 23.59% of the vote in the first round, whilst the lists supporting centre-right candidate Rosa Iorio received 58.66% of the vote. Thus, De Vivo was elected mayor, but the center-right received a two-thirds majority of council seats, and were able to enforce his resignation.

== Italian Republic (since 1946) ==
=== City Council election (1946-1998) ===
From 1946 to 1998, the Mayor of Isernia was elected by the City Council.

	Mayor	Term start	Term end	Party
1	Giuseppe Cimorelli Belfiore	6 October 1947	26 June 1950	DC
2	Carlo Veneziale	26 June 1950	9 June 1952	DC
3	Giuseppe Caroselli	9 June 1952	19 December 1953	DC
4	Sabino D'Acunto	19 December 1953	10 April 1954	DC
5	Amilcare Graziani	10 April 1954	14 June 1956	DC
6	Giovanni Ciampitti	14 June 1956	28 March 1958	DC
Special Prefectural Commissioner tenure (28 March 1958 – 21 November 1960)
7	Pietro Galgani	21 November 1960	23 July 1963	DC
8	Dora Melogli Montesoro	23 July 1963	15 January 1965	DC
9	Enrico Santoro	15 January 1965	11 March 1972	DC
10	Maria Marracino	11 March 1972	4 December 1972	DC
Special Prefectural Commissioner tenure (4 December 1972 – 3 January 1975)
11	Mario Lancellotta	3 January 1975	16 June 1977	DC
12	Gabriele Biello	16 June 1977	26 February 1979	DC
13	Maria Gentile	26 February 1979	23 September 1980	DC
(12)	Gabriele Biello	23 September 1980	4 March 1987	DC
14	Angelo Michele Iorio	4 March 1987	29 May 1990	DC
15	Domenico Testa	29 May 1990	14 May 1992	DC
Special Prefectural Commissioner tenure (14 May 1992 – 27 February 1993)
16	Marcello Veneziale	27 February 1993	29 June 1995	PDS
17	Giuseppe Caterina	29 June 1995	7 June 1998	PDS

=== Direct election (since 1998) ===
Since 1998, under provisions of new local administration law, the Mayor of Isernia is chosen by direct election, originally every four, then every five years.

	Mayor	Term start	Term end	Party	Coalition	Election
(17)	Giuseppe Caterina	8 June 1998	12 November 2001 (Note: Resigned after being elected regional councillor. The deputy mayor Gerardo Cafaro (DS) held the office till a new municipal election was held.)	PDS; DS	DS • PRC	1998
18	Gabriele Melogli	11 June 2002	29 May 2007	FI	FI • AN • UDC	2002
18	Gabriele Melogli	29 May 2007	23 May 2012	FI	FI • AN • UDC	2007
19	Ugo De Vivo	23 May 2012	13 June 2012 (Note: Ousted from office by the City Council in which he failed to win a majority.)	PD	PD • IdV • SEL	2012
Special Prefectural Commissioner tenure (13 June 2012 – 9 November 2012)
(19)	Ugo De Vivo	9 November 2012 (Note: Reappointed Mayor by a court ruling.)	14 January 2013 (Note: Ultimately removed from office following a ruling by the Council of State.)	PD	PD • IdV • SEL	(2012)
Special Prefectural Commissioner tenure (14 January 2013 – 29 May 2013)
20	Luigi Brasiello	29 May 2013	17 September 2015 (Note: Resigned after losing the majority in the City Council.)	PD	PD • UDEUR • UDC	2013
Special Prefectural Commissioner tenure (17 September 2015 – 24 June 2016)
21	Giacomo D'Apollonio	24 June 2016	19 October 2021	FdI	FdI	2016
22	Piero Castrataro	19 October 2021 (Note: Election originally scheduled for June 2021 then postponed due to the COVID-19 pandemic.)	Incumbent	Ind	PD • M5S • Volt • SI	2021
