= Mario Mauro =

Italian politician (born 1961)

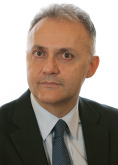

Minister of Defence
- In office 28 April 2013 – 22 February 2014
- Prime Minister: Enrico Letta
- Preceded by: Giampaolo Di Paola
- Succeeded by: Roberta Pinotti

Personal details
- Born: 24 July 1961 (age 64) San Giovanni Rotondo, Italy
- Party: FI (1999–2009); PdL (2009–2013); SC (2013); PpI (since 2014)
- Website: Website

Mario Mauro (born 24 July 1961) is an Italian politician and a university teacher of history. He is the former Minister of Defence, having served in the Letta Cabinet from 2013 to 2014. From 1999 to 2013, he was a member of the European Parliament, and he is a member of Communion and Liberation.

== Early life and education ==
Mauro was born in San Giovanni Rotondo on 24 July 1961. He studied literature and philosophy at the Università Cattolica del Sacro Cuore (UCSC) in Milan and received a degree in 1985.

== Career ==
Mauro began his career as a teacher in southern Italy after graduation and until 1999, he continued to serve as a teacher and established the Public Social Services University Research Centre. He was first elected to the European Parliament in 1999 with the PPE-DE group. From 1999 to 2004, he was vice president of the education and culture commission. On 2 July 2004, he was elected one of the 14 vice presidents of the parliament. His tenure as vice president lasted until 2009. In June 2009, he was elected again to the parliament. He assumed the post of the leader of the Italian center-right MEPs for the period of 2009–2013.

In addition to his position as European Parliamentary, he held the following positions: representative of the Organization for Security and Cooperation in Europe (OSCE) against racism, xenophobia, and discrimination, concerning discrimination against Christians from 2009 to 2011, and adjunct professor at the European University of Rome from 2007 to 2009.

In 2013, Mauro resigned from Il Popolo della Libertà and joined Civic Choice (SC). He was elected senator on With Monti for Italy's lists, a coalition between Civic Choice, Union of the Centre and Future and Freedom. He was elected leader of the SC parliamentary group in the Senate. He was replaced in the European Parliament by Susy De Martini.

On 28 April 2013, Mauro was sworn in as defense minister in the grand coalition cabinet of Enrico Letta. After internal rifts inside the Civic Choice party, Mauro left it in November 2013 and launched the new Populars for Italy.

== Personal life ==
Mauro is married to Giovanna; they have two children, Francesca Romana and Angelo.

== See also ==
- Popolari per l'Italia
- Communion and Liberation

Party political offices
New office	Leader of the People of Freedom in the European Parliament; 2009–2013	Succeeded by Giovanni La Via
New office	Leader of the Civic Choice in the Senate; 2013	Succeeded by Gianluca Susta
Political offices
Preceded by Giampaolo Di Paola	Minister of Defence; 2013–2014	Succeeded by Roberta Pinotti
