= 1995 Molise regional election =

← 1990	23 April 1995	2000 →

All 30 seats to the Regional Council of Molise

	Majority party	Minority party
Leader	Marcello Veneziale	Quintino Vincenzo Pallante
Party	PDS	Forza Italia
Alliance	Centre-left	Centre-right
Seats won	18	12
Popular vote	103,226	101,348
Percentage	50.5%	49.5%
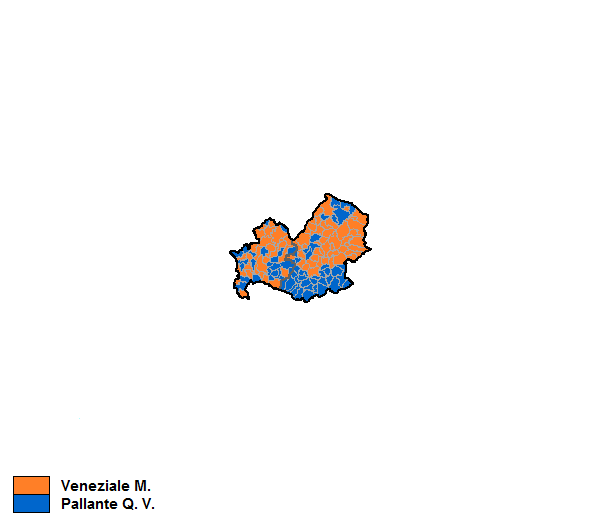
President before election
Giovanni Di Giandomenico
PPI
Elected President
Marcello Veneziale
PDS

The Molise regional election of 1995 took place on 23 April 1995.

Marcello Veneziale (Democratic Party of the Left) was elected President of the Region, defeating Quintino Pallante (National Alliance) by a narrow margin.

For the first time the President of the Region was directly elected by the people, although the election was not yet binding and the President-elect could have been replaced during the term. This is precisely what happened in 1998, when a centrist majority ousted Veneziale and replaced him with Michele Iorio (a splinter of the Italian People's Party, who switched to the Democratic Union for the Republic). In 1999 Iorio switched again party, this time to Forza Italia, and formed a centre-right government, but was soon replaced by a centre-left majority, which reinstated Veneziale.

== Results ==
Candidates	votes	votes (%)	seats reg. list	seats prov. lists
Marcello Veneziale	103,226	50.46	6	12
Democratic Party of the Left	38,102	20.13	→	5
Italian People's Party	20,759	10.97	→	3
Pact of Democrats	17,479	9.24	→	2
Communist Refoundation Party	13,259	7.01	→	2
Federation of the Greens	2,919	1.54	→	-
Quintino Vincenzo Pallante	101,348	49.54	-	12
Forza Italia – The People's Pole	37,132	19.62	→	5
National Alliance	32,603	17.23	→	4
Christian Democratic Centre	21,830	11.30	→	2
Progressive People's Party	5,611	2.96	→	1
Total	204,574	100.00	6	24

Source: Ministry of the Interior
