= 2018 Molise regional election =

← 2013	22 April 2018	2023 →

All 20 seats to the Regional Council of Molise
- Turnout: 52.17% ▼9.46%
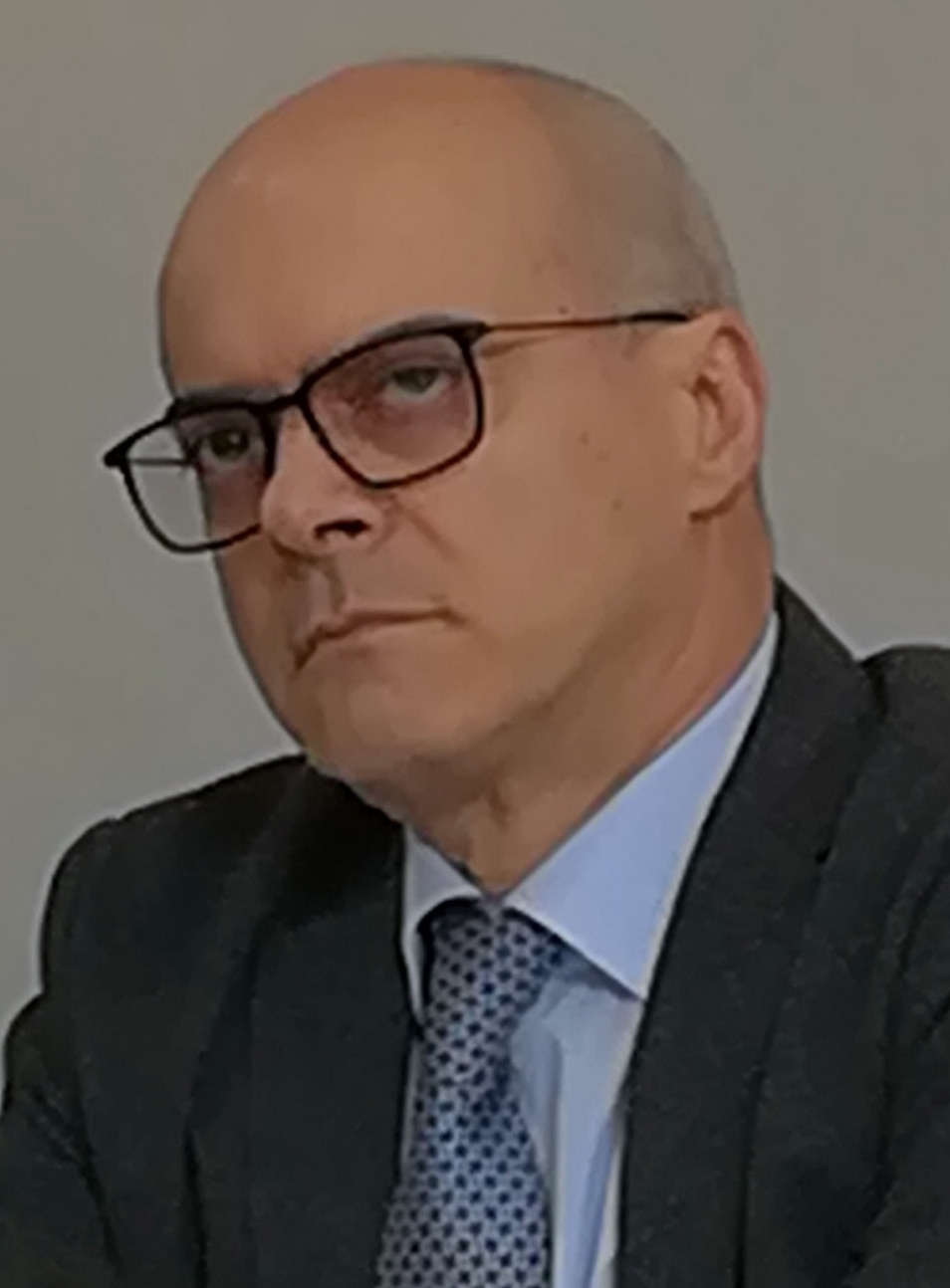

	Majority party	Minority party	Third party
Leader	Donato Toma	Andrea Greco	Carlo Veneziale
Party	Forza Italia	Five Star Movement	Democratic Party
Alliance	Centre-right		Centre-left
Seats won	13	6	2
Seat change	▲8	▲4	▼11
Popular vote	73,229	64,875	28,818
Percentage	43.5%	38.5%	17.1%
Swing	▲17.7%	▲21.7%	▼27.6%
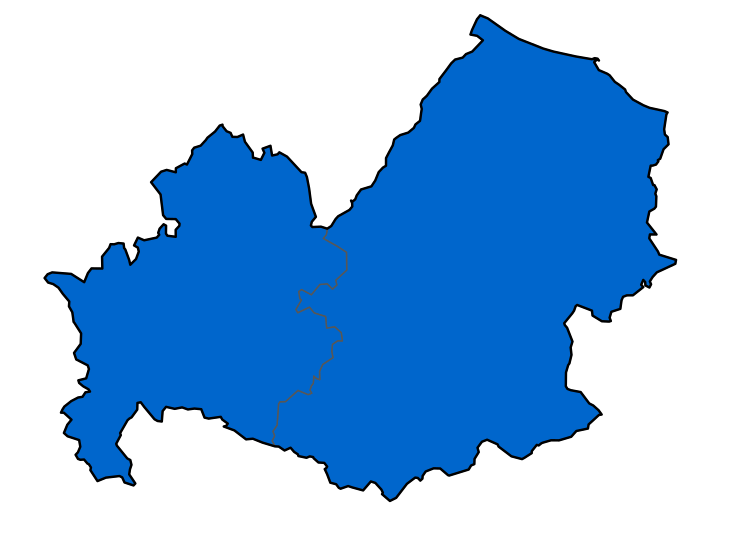
- Map of the results of the regional election. Colors identify the candidate who received a plurality in each province. Blue indicates a Toma majority.
President before election
Paolo Di Laura Frattura
PD
Elected President
Donato Toma
FI

The Molise regional election of 2018, for the renewal of the Regional Council of Molise and the election of the President of Molise, was held on 22 April 2018. Incumbent President Paolo Di Laura Frattura was not his party's candidate due to contrasts within the centre-left coalition.

Donato Toma, a member of Forza Italia, gained the most votes and was elected president.

== Parties and candidate ==
Political party or alliance	Constituent lists	Previous result		Candidate
Political party or alliance	Constituent lists	Votes (%)	Seats	Candidate
Centre-left coalition	Democratic Party (PD)	14.8	3	Carlo Veneziale
Centre-left coalition	Free and Equal (LeU)	—	—	Carlo Veneziale
Centre-left coalition	Molise 2.0–Democratic Centre (CD)	—	—	Carlo Veneziale
Centre-left coalition	Union for Molise (UM)	6.6	1	Carlo Veneziale
Centre-left coalition	Molise of All (MdT)	—	—	Carlo Veneziale
Centre-right coalition	Forza Italia (FI)	10.3	2	Donato Toma
Centre-right coalition	League (Lega)	—	—	Donato Toma
Centre-right coalition	Union of the Centre (UdC)	6.3	1	Donato Toma
Centre-right coalition	Populars for Italy (PpI)	—	—	Donato Toma
Centre-right coalition	Brothers of Italy (FdI)	—	—	Donato Toma
Centre-right coalition	Iorio for Molise–Us with Italy (NcI)	—	—	Donato Toma
Centre-right coalition	National Movement for Sovereignty (MNS)	—	—	Donato Toma
Centre-right coalition	The People of the Family (PdF)	—	—	Donato Toma
Five Star Movement (M5S)		10.2	2	Andrea Greco
CasaPound		—	—	Agostino Di Giacomo

== Results ==
2018 Molise regional election results
Candidates	Votes	%	Seats	Parties	Votes	%	Seats
Donato Toma	73,229	43.46	1				
Donato Toma	73,229	43.46	1	Forza Italia	13,627	9.38	3
Donato Toma	73,229	43.46	1	Pride Molise	12,122	8.34	2
Donato Toma	73,229	43.46	1	League	11,956	8.23	2
Donato Toma	73,229	43.46	1	Populars for Italy	10,351	7.12	2
Donato Toma	73,229	43.46	1	Union of the Centre	7,429	5.11	1
Donato Toma	73,229	43.46	1	Brothers of Italy	6,461	4.45	1
Donato Toma	73,229	43.46	1	Iorio for Molise–Us with Italy	5,204	3.58	1
Donato Toma	73,229	43.46	1	National Movement for Sovereignty	3,924	2.70	–
Donato Toma	73,229	43.46	1	The People of the Family	603	0.41	–
Donato Toma	73,229	43.46	1	Total	71,677	49.32	12
Andrea Greco	64,875	38.50	1	Five Star Movement	45,886	31.57	5
Carlo Veneziale	28,818	17.10	–				
Carlo Veneziale	28,818	17.10	–	Democratic Party	13,121	9.03	2
Carlo Veneziale	28,818	17.10	–	Free and Equal	4,784	3.39	–
Carlo Veneziale	28,818	17.10	–	Molise 2.0–Democratic Centre	3,459	2.38	–
Carlo Veneziale	28,818	17.10	–	Union for Molise	3,233	2.22	–
Carlo Veneziale	28,818	17.10	–	Molise of All	2,716	1.87	–
Carlo Veneziale	28,818	17.10	–	Total	27,313	18.79	2
Agostino Di Giacomo	707	0.42	–	CasaPound	477	0.33	–
Blank and invalid votes	5194	-	–		-	-	-
Total candidates	172,823	100.00	2	Total parties	145,353	100.00	19
Registered voters/turnout	331253	52.17	–		-	-	-
Source: Region of Molise, Istituto Cattaneo

Popular vote
M5S	31.57%
FI	9.38%
PD	9.03%
OM	8.34%
Lega	8.23%
PpI	7.12%
UdC	5.11%
FdI	4.45%
NcI	3.58%
LeU	3.39%
MNS	2.70%
CD	2.38%
UM	2.22%
MdT	1.87%
PdF	0.41%
CPI	0.33%

President
Toma	43.46%
Greco	38.50%
Veneziale	17.10%
Giacomo	0.42%

== Analysis ==
Unlike in the general election where the M5S reached about 44%, this time it reached 32%. In contrast, the centre-right coalition was up just under 20% compared to 4 March.
