= 2018 Italian regional elections =

← 2015	March–October 2018	2019 →

Presidents and regional assemblies of Lazio, Lombardy, Molise and Friuli-Venezia Giulia. Regional assemblies of Aosta Valley and Trentino-Alto Adige/Südtirol.
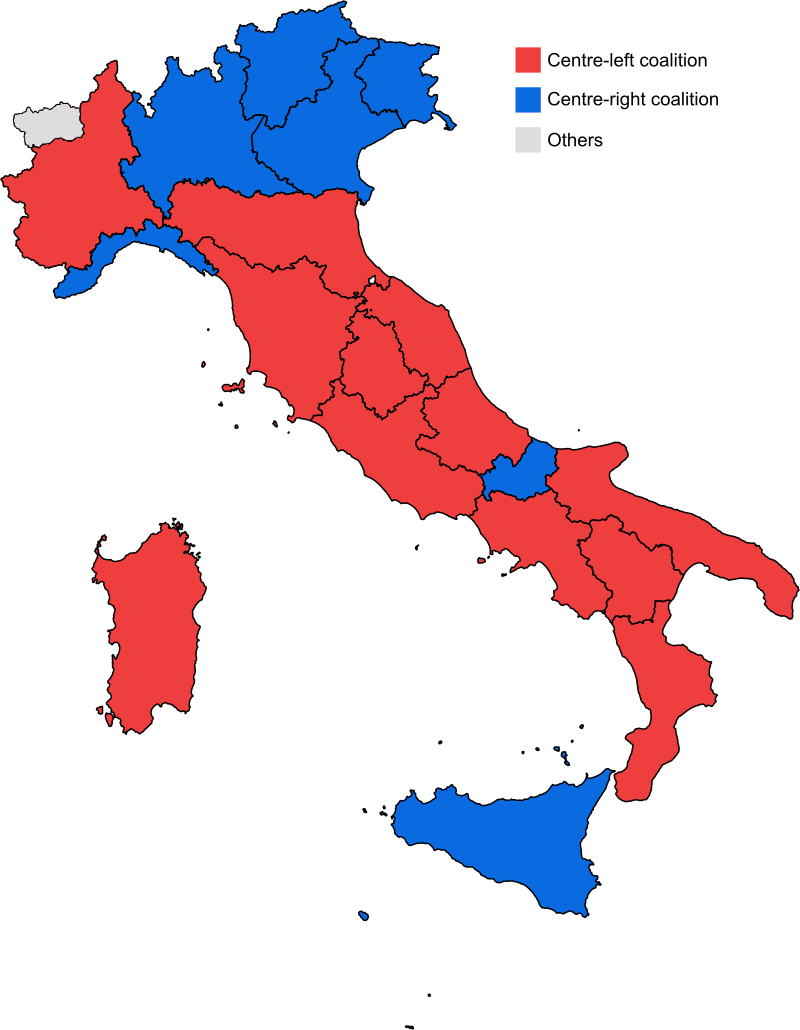
- Regions by coalition after the elections

A special round of regional elections in Italy took place in 2018 in seven of the country’s twenty regions, including Lazio and Lombardy (4 March), Molise (22 April), Friuli-Venezia Giulia (29 April), Aosta Valley (20 May) and Trentino-Alto Adige/Südtirol (21 October).

== Overall results ==
=== Regional councils ===
Party	Seats
Lega	78 / 305
Democratic Party (PD)	53 / 305
Five Star Movement (M5S)	40 / 305
Forza Italia (FI)	29 / 305
Brothers of Italy (FdI)	10 / 305
Others	96 / 305
Total	305 / 305

=== Presidents of the regions ===
Region	Election day	Outgoing			Elected		
Region	Election day	President	Party	Alliance	President	Party	Alliance
Lombardy	4 March	Roberto Maroni	Lega	Centre-right	Attilio Fontana	Lega	Centre-right
Lazio	4 March	Nicola Zingaretti	PD	Centre-left	Nicola Zingaretti	PD	Centre-left
Molise	22 April	Paolo Di Laura Frattura	PD	Centre-left	Donato Toma	FI	Centre-right
Friuli-Venezia Giulia	29 April	Debora Serracchiani	PD	Centre-left	Massimiliano Fedriga	Lega	Centre-right
Aosta Valley	20 May	Laurent Viérin	UVP	Centre-left	Nicoletta Spelgatti	Lega	Centre-right
Trentino	21 October	Ugo Rossi	PATT	Centre-left	Maurizio Fugatti	Lega	Centre-right
South Tyrol	21 October	Arno Kompatscher	SVP	Centre-left	Arno Kompatscher	SVP	Centre-right

== Summary by region ==
=== Lombardy ===
President				Regional council			
Candidate	Party	Votes	%	Alliance	Votes	%	Seats
Attilio Fontana	Lega	2,793,370	49.8	Centre-right	2,686,610	51.3	49
Giorgio Gori	PD	1,633,367	29.1	Centre-left	1,414,674	27.0	18
Dario Violi	M5S	974,984	17.4	M5S	933,243	17.8	13
Others		212,760	3.8	Others	206,194	3.9	0
Voters: 5,762,459 — Turnout: 73.1%

=== Lazio ===
President				Regional council			
Candidate	Party	Votes	%	Alliance	Votes	%	Seats
Nicola Zingaretti	PD	1,018,736	32.9	Centre-left	867,393	34.2	25
Stefano Parisi	EpI	964,757	31.2	Centre-right	922,664	36.4	15
Roberta Lombardi	M5S	835,137	27.0	M5S	559,752	22.1	10
Sergio Pirozzi	Ind	151,339	4.9	PLI–PRI	97,385	3.8	1
Others		124,067	4.0	Others	89,944	3.6	0
Voters: 3,181,235 — Turnout: 66.6%

=== Molise ===
President				Regional council			
Candidate	Party	Votes	%	Alliance	Votes	%	Seats
Donato Toma	FI	73,229	43.5	Centre-right	71,677	49.3	13
Andrea Greco	M5S	64,875	38.5	M5S	45,886	31.6	6
Carlo Veneziale	PD	28,818	17.1	Centre-left	27,313	18.8	2
Others		707	0.4	Others	477	0.3	0
Voters: 172,823 — Turnout: 52.2%

=== Friuli-Venezia Giulia ===
President				Regional council			
Candidate	Party	Votes	%	Alliance	Votes	%	Seats
Massimiliano Fedriga	Lega	307,123	57.1	Centre-right	265,224	62.7	29
Sergio Bolzonello	PD	144,363	26.8	Centre-left	110,486	26.1	14
Alessandro Fraleoni Morgera	M5S	62,776	11.7	M5S	29,862	7.1	4
Sergio Cecotti	PpA	23,696	4.4	PpA	17,350	4.1	2
Voters: 549,390 — Turnout: 49.6%

=== Trentino ===
President				Provincial council			
Candidate	Party	Votes	%	Alliance	Votes	%	Seats
Maurizio Fugatti	Lega	124,590	46.7	Centre-right	120,906	47.4	21
Giorgio Tonini	PD	67,712	25.4	Centre-left	63,350	24.8	8
Ugo Rossi	PATT	33,121	12.4	PATT	32,109	12.6	4
Filippo Degasperi	M5S	18,922	7.1	M5S	18,437	7.2	2
Others		22,236	8.4	Others	20,335	8.0	0
Voters: 266,615 — Turnout: 64.0%
