= Susy De Martini =

Italian politician (born 1952)

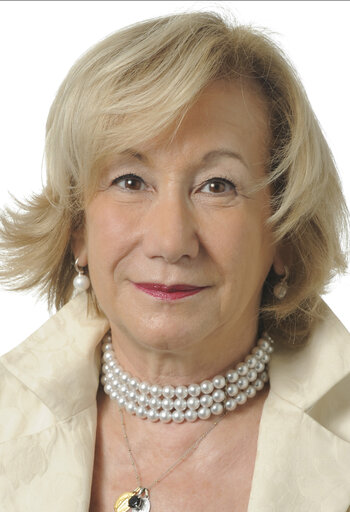
Isabella DE MARTINI - 7th Parliamentary Term - Italy ECR

Professor Isabella 'Susy' De Martini (born 17 June 1952 in Genoa) is an Italian politician and academic. Former member of PDL, from 12 April 2013 to 25 May 2014 she was a Member of the European Parliament, representing North-West Italy. De Martini is also a professor at the University of Genoa.

De Martini was a regional coordinator of the Liberal Democratici as part of the electoral list of Il Popolo della Libertà (PDL) in the 2008 general election. She stood on the PDL's electoral list at the 2009 European election. She won 19,205 votes: not enough to win her a seat, but finishing first amongst those that were not elected. When two MEPs were appointed Senators after the 2013 general election, De Martini succeeded Mario Mauro, becoming an MEP on 12 April 2013. Upon her election, she immediately left the PDL delegation and its European People's Party group and joined the European Conservatives and Reformists. She stood on the Forza Italia's electoral list at the 2014 European election because Silvio Berlusconi presented De Martini as «a "reference point" for Liguria». She won 6,134 votes: not enough to win her a seat, she failed re-election and left Berlusconi's party. On 16 July 2015 De Martini took part, as «official representative for Italy of British Conservatives» in the founding of Raffaele Fitto's new eurosceptic party Conservatori e Riformisti (CR) split from FI, the Berlusconi's party. De Martini was candidate for Mayor of Genoa in the 2012 local elections for Francesco Storace's right-wing party La Destra (split from Alleanza Nazionale in 2007), winning 0.8% of the vote, not enough to win her a seat as municipal councilor because she failed the 3% threshold.
