= Sardinia 20Twenty =

Sardinia 20Twenty Sardegna 20Venti
- Leader: Stefano Tunis
- Founded: 2013
- Headquarters: Via Iglesias 45 - 09125 Cagliari
- Ideology: Regionalism; Liberal conservatism
- Political position: Centre-right
- Regional affiliation: Centre-right coalition
- Regional Council of Sardinia: 3 / 60

Website
- https://www.sardegna20venti.it/

Sardinia 20Twenty (Italian: Sardegna 20Venti, abbr. S20V) is a regionalist and liberal-conservative political party active in Sardinia, led by Stefano Tunis.

== History ==
The party was founded in 2013 by Stefano Tunis (the director of the Regional Employment Agency). In 2014 In 2014 he left his position as director to run for the Regional Council among the ranks of Forza Italia and was elected with 5,433 votes.

In 2018, Tunis, leader of Sardinia 20Twenty, was indicated by Forza Italia as a possible candidate for the presidency of the region Sardinia in the upcoming regional elections in 2019. Eventually, Forza Italia supported the candidacy of Christian Solinas of the Sardinian Action Party. Solinas' candidacy (which later turned out to be a winner) was also supported by the party headed by Tunis, which obtained 4.1% of the votes and three seats.

Following the election, the councillors Domenico Gallus and Pietro Moro, elected together with Tunis among the ranks of S20V, decided to join the Union of the Centre.

In the 2024 regional election, the party joined forces with Italy in the Centre–Us Moderates and obtained 5.5% of the vote and three regional councillors.

== Election results ==
=== Regional elections ===
| Election | Votes | % | Seats | +/– |
|---|---|---|---|---|
| 2019 | 29,473 | 4.1 | 3 / 60 | New |
| 2024 | 37,950 | 5.5 | 3 / 60 | 0 |
