= Giovanni Ciampitti =

Italian politician (1877–1967)

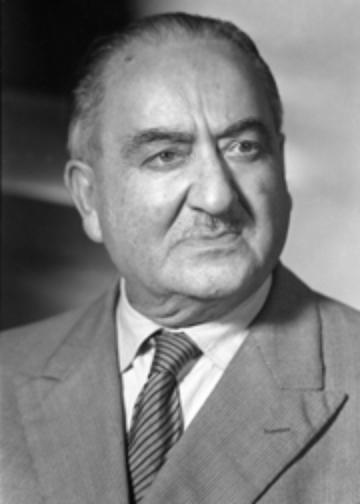
Giovanni Ciampitti

Giovanni Ciampitti (7 June 1877 – 22 April 1967) was an Italian politician who served as member of the Constituent Assembly (1946–1948), Senator (1948–1953) and Mayor of Isernia (1956–1958).
