= Carlo Vitale =

Italian painter

- Born: 20 November 1902; Milan, Italy
- Died: 8 March 1996 (aged 93); Camogli, Italy
- Occupation: Painter

Carlo Vitale (20 November 1902 – 8 March 1996) was an Italian painter. His work was part of the painting event in the art competition at the 1936 Summer Olympics.
