= Enrico Santoro =

Italian politician

President of Molise
- In office 27 July 1990 – 3 August 1992
- Preceded by: Fernando Di Laura Frattura
- Succeeded by: Luigi Di Bartolomeo

Mayor of Isernia
- In office 15 January 1965 – 11 March 1972
- Preceded by: Dora Melogli Montesoro
- Succeeded by: Maria Marracino

Personal details
- Born: 18 September 1932 (age 93) Isernia, Molise, Italy
- Party: Christian Democracy
- Occupation: lawyer

Enrico Santoro (born 18 September 1932) was an Italian politician who served as Mayor of Isernia (1965–1972) and President of Molise (1990–1992).

Political offices
Preceded by Fernando Di Laura Frattura	President of Molise; 1990–1992	Succeeded by Luigi Di Bartolomeo
Preceded by Dora Melogli Montesoro	Mayor of Isernia; 1965–1972	Succeeded by Maria Marracino
