= 2023 Molise regional election =

Regional elections in Molise

| ← 2018 | 25–26 June 2023 | 2028 → |

All 20 seats to the Regional Council of Molise
- Turnout: 47.95% ▼4.22%
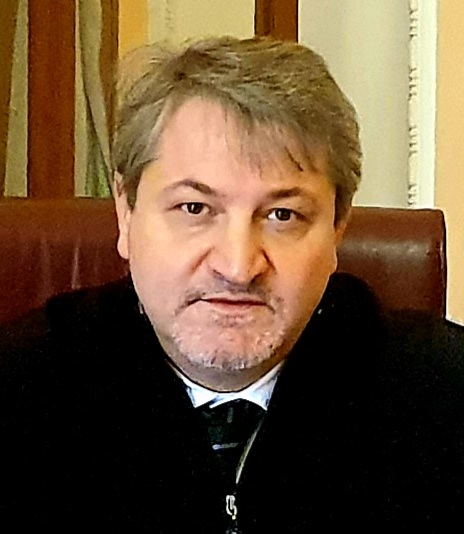

| | Majority party | Minority party |
|---|---|---|
| Leader | Francesco Roberti | Roberto Gravina |
| Party | FI | M5S |
| Alliance | Centre-right | Centre-left |
| Seats won | 14 | 7 |
| Seat change | ▲1 | ▼1 |
| Popular vote | 94,770 | 55,308 |
| Percentage | 62.2% | 36.3% |
| Swing | ▲18.7% | ▼19.3% |
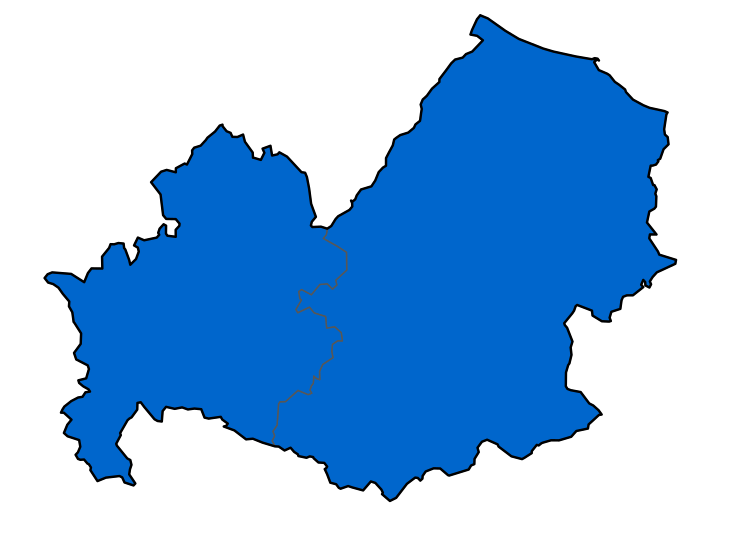
- Map of the results of the regional election. Colors identify the candidate who received a plurality in each province. Blue indicates a Roberti majority.
President before election
Donato Toma
FI
Elected President
Francesco Roberti
FI

The Molise regional election of 2023, for the renewal of the Regional Council of Molise and the election of the President of Molise, have been held on 25 and 26 June 2023.

== Parties and candidate ==
| Political party or alliance | Constituent lists | Previous result | | Candidate |
| Political party or alliance | Constituent lists | Votes (%) | Seats | Candidate |
|---|---|---|---|---|
| Centre-right coalition | Forza Italia (FI) | 9.4 | 3 | Francesco Roberti |
| Centre-right coalition | League | 8.2 | 2 | Francesco Roberti |
| Centre-right coalition | Populars for Molise (PpM) | 7.1 | 2 | Francesco Roberti |
| Centre-right coalition | Union of the Centre – Christian Democracy – Us of the Centre (Note: incl. IV and MaC) | 5.1 | 1 | Francesco Roberti |
| Centre-right coalition | Brothers of Italy | 4.5 | 1 | Francesco Roberti |
| Centre-right coalition | Molise in Good Hands – Us Moderates | 3.6 | 1 | Francesco Roberti |
| Centre-right coalition | Molise we want | — | — | Francesco Roberti |
| Centre-left coalition | Five Star Movement | 31.6 | 5 | Roberto Gravina |
| Centre-left coalition | Democratic Party | 9.0 | 2 | Roberto Gravina |
| Centre-left coalition | Greens and Left Alliance–Territorial Equity | 3.4 | 0 | Roberto Gravina |
| Centre-left coalition | Building Democracy | — | — | Roberto Gravina |
| Centre-left coalition | Gravina for President – Progress Molise (Note: incl. Volt) | — | — | Roberto Gravina |
| Centre-left coalition | Democratic and Socialist Molise (Democratic and Solidary Molise – PSI) | — | — | Roberto Gravina |
| I don't vote for the usual (Note: incl. AC) | | — | — | Emilio Izzo |

== Opinion polls ==
Candidates

| Date | Polling firm | Sample size | Roberti | Gravina | Izzo | Lead |
|---|---|---|---|---|---|---|
| 31 May–1 Jun 2023 | Tecnè | 1,000 | 53.0 | 45.0 | 2.0 | 8.0 |

Hypothetical candidates

| Date | Polling firm | Sample size | Roberti | Other CDX | Gravina | Other CSX | Others | Lead |
|---|---|---|---|---|---|---|---|---|
| 12–14 Apr 2023 | Tecnè | 800 | 56.0 | — | 44.0 | — | — | 12.0 |
| 12–14 Apr 2023 | Tecnè | 800 | 63.0 | — | — | 37.0 (Note: Vittorino Facciolla) | — | 26.0 |
| 12–14 Apr 2023 | Tecnè | 800 | 68.0 | — | — | 32.0 (Note: Micaela Fanelli) | — | 36.0 |
| 12–14 Apr 2023 | Tecnè | 800 | 62.0 | — | — | 38.0 (Note: Enzo Di Giacomo) | — | 24.0 |
| 12–14 Apr 2023 | Tecnè | 800 | 52.0 | — | — | 48.0 (Note: Domenico Iannacone) | — | 4.0 |
| 12–14 Apr 2023 | Tecnè | 800 | — | 48.0 (Note: Luca Brunese) | 52.0 | — | — | 4.0 |
| 12–14 Apr 2023 | Tecnè | 800 | — | 56.0 | — | 44.0 | — | 12.0 |
| 12–14 Apr 2023 | Tecnè | 800 | — | 57.0 | — | 43.0 | — | 14.0 |
| 12–14 Apr 2023 | Tecnè | 800 | — | 51.0 | — | 49.0 | — | 2.0 |
| 12–14 Apr 2023 | Tecnè | 800 | — | 45.0 | — | 55.0 | — | 10.0 |

Political parties

| Date | Polling firm | Sample size | Centre-right | | | | | Centre-left | | | | A–IV | +E | PlI | Others | Lead |
| Date | Polling firm | Sample size | FdI | FI | Lega | NM-UdC | other CDX | PD | M5S | AVS | other CSX | A–IV | +E | PlI | Others | Lead |
|---|---|---|---|---|---|---|---|---|---|---|---|---|---|---|---|---|
| 24 Feb 2023 | Euromedia | — | 28.8 | 11.4 | 4.7 | 1.2 | 4.0 | 20.8 | 20.3 | 2.0 | 3.0 | 2.3 | 1.0 | 0.3 | — | 8.0 |

== Results ==
25–26 June 2023 Molise regional election results
| Candidates | Votes | % | Seats | Parties | Votes | % | Seats |
|---|---|---|---|---|---|---|---|
| Francesco Roberti | 94,770 | 62.24 | 1 | | | | |
| Francesco Roberti | 94,770 | 62.24 | 1 | Brothers of Italy | 26,649 | 18.85 | 4 |
| Francesco Roberti | 94,770 | 62.24 | 1 | Forza Italia | 16,924 | 11.97 | 3 |
| Francesco Roberti | 94,770 | 62.24 | 1 | Molise we want | 13,971 | 9.88 | 2 |
| Francesco Roberti | 94,770 | 62.24 | 1 | Molise in Good Hands – Us Moderates | 10,582 | 7.48 | 2 |
| Francesco Roberti | 94,770 | 62.24 | 1 | Populars for Molise | 9,666 | 6.84 | 1 |
| Francesco Roberti | 94,770 | 62.24 | 1 | League | 8,481 | 6.00 | 1 |
| Francesco Roberti | 94,770 | 62.24 | 1 | Union of the Centre–DC–NDC | 5,005 | 3.54 | 0 |
| Francesco Roberti | 94,770 | 62.24 | 1 | Total | 91,278 | 64.55 | 13 |
| Roberto Gravina | 55,308 | 36.32 | 1 | | | | |
| Roberto Gravina | 55,308 | 36.32 | 1 | Democratic Party | 17,031 | 12.04 | 3 |
| Roberto Gravina | 55,308 | 36.32 | 1 | Five Star Movement | 10,044 | 7.10 | 2 |
| Roberto Gravina | 55,308 | 36.32 | 1 | Building Democracy | 8,105 | 5.73 | 1 |
| Roberto Gravina | 55,308 | 36.32 | 1 | Greens and Left Alliance–Territorial Equity | 6,742 | 4.77 | 0 |
| Roberto Gravina | 55,308 | 36.32 | 1 | Gravina for President–Progress Molise | 5,928 | 4.19 | 0 |
| Roberto Gravina | 55,308 | 36.32 | 1 | Democratic and Socialist Molise | 1,086 | 0.77 | 0 |
| Roberto Gravina | 55,308 | 36.32 | 1 | Total | 48,936 | 34.61 | 6 |
| Emilio Izzo | 2,191 | 1.44 | 0 | I don't vote for the usual | 1,197 | 0.85 | 0 |
| Blank and invalid votes | 4,912 | 3.13 | | | | | |
| Total candidates | 152,269 | 100.00 | 2 | Total parties | 141,411 | 100.00 | 19 |
| Registered voters/turnout | 327,805 | 47.95 | | | | | |
Source: Elezioni Molise 2023
