= Paolo Nuvoli =

Italian politician (1935–2025)

President of Molise
- In office 13 May 1985 – 16 June 1988
- Preceded by: Ulderico Adolfo Colagiovanni
- Succeeded by: Fernando Di Laura Frattura

Personal details
- Born: 1 September 1935 Monteroduni, Italy
- Died: 4 December 2025 (aged 90) Isernia, Italy
- Party: DC
- Occupation: Business manager

Paolo Nuvoli (1 August 1935 – 4 December 2025) was an Italian politician. A member of Christian Democracy, he served as president of Molise from 1985 to 1988.

Nuvoli died on 4 December 2025, at the age of 90.
