= Ulderico Adolfo Colagiovanni =

Italian politician

President of Molise
- In office 3 November 1984 – 14 October 1985
- Preceded by: Giustino D'Uva
- Succeeded by: Paolo Nuvoli

President of the Regional Council of Molise
- In office 14 June 1975 – 16 June 1980
- Preceded by: Florindo D'Aimmo
- Succeeded by: Gabriele Veneziale

Member of the Regional Council of Molise
- In office 1970–1991

Personal details
- Born: 13 January 1917 Campodipietra, Province of Molise, Kingdom of Italy
- Died: 1996 (aged 78–79) Campobasso, Molise, Italy
- Party: Italian Socialist Party; Italian Democratic Socialist Party; Christian Democracy
- Occupation: Teacher, school principal, journalist

Ulderico Adolfo Colagiovanni (13 January 1917 – 1996) was an Italian politician who served as president of Molise from 1984 to 1985 and as president of the Regional Council of Molise from 1975 to 1980.

== Life and career ==
Colagiovanni was born in Campodipietra in 1917. He graduated in classical literature and worked as a teacher and later as a school principal at teacher training institutes.

He initially joined the Italian Socialist Party, where he directed the newspaper Il Lavoratore and served as councillor in the first post-fascist municipal administration of Campobasso in 1944, appointed by the National Liberation Committee. He later joined the Italian Democratic Socialist Party in 1947 and eventually the Christian Democracy in 1958.

He was elected provincial councillor of Campobasso in 1960 and became regional party secretary in 1963. From 1962 to 1966 he also served as president of US Campobasso.

Colagiovanni was a member of the Regional Council of Molise from 1970 to 1991. He served as president of the council from 1975 to 1980, and later as president of Molise from November 1984 to October 1985.

== Sources ==
- Bertolini, Barbara (1998). "Colagiovanni, Ulderico Adolfo". Molisani, milleuno profili e biografie. Campobasso: Enne.
