= Us Moderates =

Us Moderates Noi Moderati
- President: Maurizio Lupi
- Secretary: Mara Carfagna
- Founded: 11 August 2022 (electoral list); 21 May 2023 (party)
- Merger of: Identity and Action; Italy in the Centre; Us with Italy
- Ideology: Liberal conservatism Christian democracy
- Political position: Centre to centre-right
- National affiliation: Centre-right coalition Civics of Italy (Senate)
- European affiliation: European People's Party
- Colours: Blue
- Chamber of Deputies: 7 / 400
- Senate: 3 / 205
- European Parliament: 0 / 76
- Regional Councils: 11 / 896

Website
- noimoderati.it

Us Moderates (Italian: Noi moderati, NM) is a centrist political party in Italy, led by Maurizio Lupi.

The party has had several associated members and regional partners. At the European level, it is a member of the European People's Party. Most of NM's members and elected officials are former members of Forza Italia.

== History ==
Us Moderates was launched as an electoral joint list within the centre-right coalition in the 2022 Italian general election, which obtained 0.9% of the vote, seven deputies and two senators. NM was originally composed of four founding members: Us with Italy (NcI), Italy in the Centre (IaC), the Union of the Centre (UdC) and Coraggio Italia (CI). After the election, NM formed parliamentary groups both in the Chamber of Deputies and the Senate (Civics of Italy), thanks to the influx of some elects from the Brothers of Italy and the alliance with the Associative Movement of Italians Abroad (MAIE).

In May 2023 NM evolved into a unitary party, causing the splits of CI and the UdC. Maurizio Lupi, leader of NcI, became NM's leader and president, while Giovanni Toti, leader of IaC, was appointed president of the party's national council during the party's first congress, held in October 2023. In January 2024 Italy of Values (IdV), formerly aligned with the centre-left, joined and its leader Ignazio Messina became NM's spokesperson. In February UdC leader Lorenzo Cesa aligned his party with the League and subsequently left NM's group in the Chamber. In 2023 regional elections NM or its associate parties won 7.5% of the vote in Molise, 2.0% in Friuli-Venezia Giulia, 1.2% in Lombardy and 1.1% in Lazio.

In the 2024 European Parliament election NM ran with Forza Italia (FI), obtaining 9.6% of the vote, but no seats for the party. In the subsequent Ligurian regional election two lists formed mostly by NM members ("Bucci for President" and "Ligurian Pride") obtained a combined score of 15.2% in a region that had been governed by Toti from 2015 to 2024 and where his Cambiamo! had obtained 22.9% in 2020. In the other 2024 regional elections where NM had fielded its own lists, the party had won 2.9% of the vote in Umbria, 2.7% in Abruzzo and 0.7% in Piedmont, while Sardinia 20Twenty, a regional partner of NM, formed mostly by former FI members, had obtained 5.5% in Sardinia.

In September 2024 Mara Carfagna, Mariastella Gelmini and Giusy Versace, all three former FI members who had joined Action in 2022, formed an association named "Popular Centre". In October they officially joined NM, as well as its parliamentary groups in the Chamber and the Senate. In November 2024 NM changed its symbol, adding to its name also "Populars for Europe", and it was announced that the party was seeking to join the European People's Party (EPP) in the coming months. The party was officially admitted into the EPP in January 2025. In March 2025 Carafagna was appointed secretary, while in July Ilaria Cavo, Toti's number two in Cambiamo! and IaC, was selected president of the national council, replacing her mentor.

In the 2025 regional elections the party fielded its own lists in most regions, aiming at strengthening its role as fourth pillar of the centre-right coalition and obtaining 4.0% of the vote and two regional councillors in Calabria (down from a combined score of CI and NcI of 8.7% in 2021), 1.6% in Marche, 1.3% in Campania, 1.2% in Tuscany, 1.1% in Veneto and 0.8% in Apulia.

== Composition ==
=== Founding members merged into NM ===
Party	Ideology	Leader
Us with Italy (NcI)	Liberal conservatism	Maurizio Lupi
Italy in the Centre (IaC) (Note: Including Cambiamo! (C!) and Identity and Action (IDeA).)	Liberal conservatism	Giovanni Toti

=== Associate member parties ===
Party	Ideology	Leader
Popular Centre (CP)	Liberal conservatism	Mariastella Gelmini
Italy of Values (IdV)	Populism	Ignazio Messina
Party of Europeans and Liberals (PEL)	Liberalism	Francesco Patamia
Associative Movement of Italians Abroad (MAIE)	Centrism	Ricardo Antonio Merlo
Animalist Movement (AM)	Animal rights	Michela Brambilla

=== Regional member parties ===
Party	Region	Ideology	Leader
Responsible Autonomy (AR)	Friuli-Venezia Giulia	Liberal conservatism	Renzo Tondo
Popular Liguria (PL)	Liguria	Liberal conservatism	Andrea Costa
Alliance of the Centre (AdC)	Campania	Christian democracy	Francesco Pionati
Cantiere Popolare (CP)	Sicily	Christian democracy	Francesco Saverio Romano
Sardinia 20Twenty (S20V)	Sardinia	Liberal conservatism	Stefano Tunis

=== Founding members that have left NM ===
Party	Ideology	Leader
Coraggio Italia (CI)	Liberal conservatism	Luigi Brugnaro
Union of the Centre (UdC)	Christian democracy	Lorenzo Cesa

=== Former associate member parties ===
Party	Ideology	Leader
Renaissance	Liberalism	Vittorio Sgarbi

== Election results ==
=== National Parliament ===
Election	Leader	Chamber of Deputies					Senate of the Republic					Government
Election	Leader	Votes	%	Seats	+/–	Position	Votes	%	Seats	+/–	Position	Government
2022	Maurizio Lupi	254,127	0.91	7 / 400	New	12th	248,308	0.89	2 / 200	New	13th	Coalition (2022–present)

=== European Parliament ===
Election	Leader	Votes	%	Seats	+/–	EP Group
2024	Maurizio Lupi	Into Forza Italia		0 / 76	New	–

=== Regional Councils ===
Region	Election year	Votes	%	Seats	+/−	Status in legislature
Piedmont	2024	11,441	0.7	0 / 50	0	No seats
Lombardy	2023	33,711	1.2	1 / 80	0	Majority
Veneto	2025	18,768	1.1	0 / 51	0	No seats
Friuli-Venezia Giulia	2023	7,762	2.0	0 / 49	▼1	No seats
Liguria	2024	53,208	9.5	3 / 31	▼5	Majority
Tuscany	2025	14,564	1.2	0 / 41	0	No seats
Marche	2025	9,299	1.6	0 / 31	0	No seats
Umbria	2024	9,229	2.9	0 / 21	0	No seats
Lazio	2023	17,398	1.1	0 / 50	0	No seats
Abruzzo	2024	15,516	2.7	1 / 31	▲1	Majority
Molise	2023	10,582	7.5	2 / 21	▲2	Majority
Campania	2025	25,559	1.3	0 / 51	0	No seats
Apulia	2025	10,997	0.8	0 / 51	0	No seats
Calabria	2025	30,613	4.0	2 / 31	▲2	Majority
Sardinia	2024	37,950	5.5	3 / 60	0	Opposition

== Leadership ==
- President: Maurizio Lupi (2022–present)
  - Vice President: Giuseppe Galati (2023–present)
- Secretary: Mara Carfagna (2025–present)
- Coordinator: Francesco Saverio Romano (2023–present)
- President of the national council: Giovanni Toti (2023–2025), Ilaria Cavo (2025–present)
- Organisational Secretary: Alessandro Colucci (2023–present)
- Spokesperson: Ignazio Messina (2024–present)

== Symbols ==
2023–2024

2024–present
