= Luigi Di Bartolomeo =

Italian politician (1943–2022)

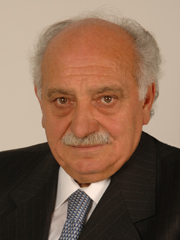

Mayor of Campobasso
- In office 8 June 2009 – 29 May 2014
- Preceded by: Giuseppe Di Fabio
- Succeeded by: Antonio Battista

Member of the Italian Senate
- In office 21 November 2006 – 28 April 2008

President of Molise
- In office 3 August 1992 – 22 December 1993
- Preceded by: Enrico Santoro
- Succeeded by: Giovanni Di Giandomenico

Personal details
- Born: 7 January 1943; Campobasso, Molise, Italy
- Died: 18 February 2022 (aged 79); Campobasso, Italy
- Political party: DC (till 1994); MpA (2005-2009); PdL (2009-2013); Forza Italia (2013-2022)

Luigi Di Bartolomeo (7 January 1943 – 18 February 2022) was an Italian politician. He was a member of Christian Democracy, before joining the centre-right party The People of Freedom in 2009 and then Forza Italia in 2013.

== Biography ==
Di Bartolomeo was born in Campobasso, Molise, on 7 January 1943.

He served as President of Molise from August 1992 to December 1993 and as Mayor of Campobasso from June 2009 to May 2014. Di Bartolomeo was elected for the Senate of the Republic at the 2006 general election.

Di Bartolomeo died on 18 February 2022, at the age of 79.

== See also ==
- 2006 Italian general election
- 2009 Italian local elections
- List of mayors of Campobasso
- List of presidents of Molise

Political offices
Preceded by Giuseppe Di Fabio	Mayor of Campobasso; 2009–2014	Succeeded by Antonio Battista
Preceded by Enrico Santoro	President of Molise; 1992–1993	Succeeded by Giovanni Di Giandomenico
