= Angelo Michele Iorio =

Italian politician (born 1948)

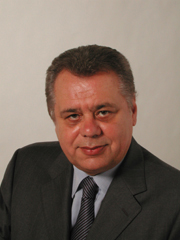

President of Molise
- In office 20 November 1998 – 11 May 1999
- Preceded by: Marcello Veneziale
- Succeeded by: Marcello Veneziale
- In office 21 November 2001 – 18 March 2013
- Preceded by: Giovanni Di Stasi
- Succeeded by: Paolo Di Laura Frattura

Mayor of Isernia
- In office 4 March 1987 – 29 May 1990
- Preceded by: Gabriele Biello
- Succeeded by: Domenico Testa

Member of the Senate of the Republic
- In office 28 April 2006 – 2 November 2006

Member of the Chamber of Deputies
- In office 30 May 2001 – 15 January 2003

Personal details
- Born: 17 January 1948 (age 78) Morrone del Sannio, Italy
- Party: DC (till 1994); PPI (1994–1998); FI (1998–2009); PdL (2009–2013); FI (2013–2017); NcI (2017–2019); FdI (since 2019)
- Education: Sapienza University of Rome
- Profession: Medic, politician

Angelo Michele Iorio (born 17 January 1948) is an Italian politician. He was president of Molise from 1998 to 1999 and from 2001 to 2013.

== Biography ==
After graduating in Medicine at the Sapienza University of Rome, Iorio began his medical career as a surgeon at the Ospedale Civile in Isernia. In 1975, he joined the Christian Democracy (DC) party, and between 1980 and 1990 he held various positions in local administrations, including councilor for public works in the province of Isernia, councilor for urban planning, and mayor of Isernia.

In 1994, after the dissolution of the DC, Iorio joined the Italian People's Party (PPI), in whose lists he was elected for the 1995 Molise regional elections. In February 1998, Iorio left the PPI to join Forza Italia. Subsequently, he promoted a majority that was different from the one that came out from the 1995 regional election; he then replaced the president Marcello Veneziale from The Olive Tree coalition and took over his place as president of Molise.

After having been defeated at the 2000 Molise regional election due to some defects of form, Iorio managed to cancel the result of the elections, and in the 2001 Molise regional election he was re-elected president. He won the 2006 Molise regional election, and then managed re-election in the 2011 Molise regional election; both of those elections were cancelled due to irregularity in the voting. Iorio tried once again to be elected president at the 2013 Molise regional election but was defeated by the Democratic Party candidate Paolo Di Laura Frattura.

After failing to be elected to the Senate of the Republic at the 2018 Italian general election, Iorio candidated at the regional council of Molise for the 2018 Italian regional elections, supporting the centre-right coalition governor candidate Donato Toma, who was elected president of Molise. Iorio won a seat in the regional council of Molise, elected with Us with Italy.
