= August 24th Movement =

Italian political party

August 24th Movement Movimento 24 Agosto
- President: Pino Aprile
- Secretary: Rossella Solombrino
- Founded: 24 August 2019; 7 years ago
- Headquarters: Piazza Portanova 11; 80138 Naples
- Ideology: Meridionalism; Regionalism; Anti-racism
- National affiliation: Peace, Land, Dignity
- European affiliation: Greens–European Free Alliance
- Chamber of Deputies: 0 / 400
- Senate: 0 / 200
- European Parliament: 0 / 76
- Regional Councils: 0 / 896

Website
- movimentoequitaterritoriale.it

The August 24th Movement (Italian: Movimento 24 Agosto, M24A) – officially called Territorial Equity Movement (Italian: Movimento Equità Territoriale, MET) – is a regionalist political party in Italy, launched in August 2019. Its leader is the journalist Pino Aprile.

== History ==
During the 2019 Italian government crisis, Pino Aprile called for a meeting on 24 August in the Grancia Park, Basilicata, near Brindisi Montagna, to counter Matteo Salvini's victory in the snap election he requested. More than 500 people from the southern regions of Italy attended the meeting and the foundation of the party, including senator Saverio De Bonis, criticizing the differentiated autonomy pursued by Lombardy, Veneto and Emilia-Romagna. On 13 October, Aprile officially presented the charter of the party and its logo in the "Aroldo Tieri" movie theatre in Cosenza. Since 2021, MEP Piernicola Pedicini joined the August 24th Movement, assuming the position of vice-president.

== Leadership ==
- President: Pino Aprile (2019–present)
- Vice-President: Piernicola Pedicini (2021–2022)
- Secretary: Piernicola Pedicini (2022–2024), Vincenzo Greco (2024), Rossella Solombrino (2024–present)

== Election results ==
=== European Parliament ===
Election	Leader	Votes	%	Seats	+/–	EP Group
2024	Pino Aprile	Into PTD		0 / 76	New	–

=== Regional Councils ===
Region	Election year	Votes	%	Seats	+/−	Status in legislature
Molise	2023	With AVS		0 / 21	0	No seats
Campania	2025	Into Fico for President		0 / 51	0	No seats
Apulia	2025	Into AVS		0 / 51	0	No seats
