= Populars for Italy =

Populars for Italy Popolari per l'Italia
- President: Mario Mauro
- Founded: 28 January 2014
- Dissolved: 18 September 2025
- Split from: Civic Choice
- Merged into: Popular Base
- Ideology: Christian democracy Social conservatism Pro-Europeanism
- Political position: Centre-right
- National affiliation: Forza Italia
- European affiliation: European People's Party

Website
- www.popolariperlitalia.org

Populars for Italy (Italian: Popolari per l'Italia, PpI) was a Christian-democratic political party in Italy led by Mario Mauro, minister of Defence in Letta Cabinet and, previously, long-serving MEP for Forza Italia.

== History ==
The party was launched in November 2013 by splinters from Civic Choice (SC) led by Mario Mauro and Lorenzo Dellai, who wanted to continue supporting Enrico Letta's government (in which Mauro served as minister of Defence), but disagreed with SC's perceived liberal outlook. Soon after, the PpI formed joint parliamentary groups, named For Italy, with the Union of the Centre (UdC). According to its leaders, the party would soon merge with the UdC into a new "centrist" party.

The party was officially founded on 28 January 2014. In the meantime, Mauro was appointed president.

In February 2014, Mauro was not confirmed as minister of Defence in Matteo Renzi's government, but the PpI joined the government with one deputy minister (Andrea Olivero at Agriculture) and three undersecretaries.

In the 2014 European Parliament election, the party endorsed the New Centre-Right – Union of the Centre joint list.

In July 2014, the PpI suffered the defection of its left-wing faction (composed by the majority of the party's MPs: eight deputies out of twelve and two senators out of eight), led by Dellai, Olivero, Mario Marazziti, Mario Giro and Lucio Romano, who launched Solidary Democracy (Demo.S). The new party re-affirmed the strategic alliance with Renzi's Democratic Party and its support for the government, while the PpI considered it just temporary as the party's declared goal was to restructure the centre-right camp instead. By November, the PpI were reduced to two deputies and three senators.

On 11 September 2014, the PpI were officially accepted into the European People's Party (EPP).

In November 2014, in an interview to Il Giornale, Mauro hinted that the party might leave the Renzi Cabinet and explained that its goal was that of dissolving Italy's EPP-member parties (the new Forza Italia, the New Centre-Right, the UdC and the PpI) in a joint centre-right party. Consequently, the three PpI senators left For Italy in order to join Great Autonomies and Freedom, a centre-right miscellaneous group, but the PpI continued to participate in the government with two undersecretaries, Domenico Rossi (Defense) and Angela D'Onghia (Education).

Eventually, after the 2015 regional elections, which the party contested with its own list only in Apulia (obtaining a mere 0.4% of the vote), the PpI decided to end their support to the Renzi Cabinet. As a consequence, three MPs left the party: Rossi and D'Onghia in order to continue to be part of the government, and Tito Di Maggio to join the Conservatives and Reformists, a group of splinters from the new Forza Italia, led by Raffaele Fitto. Finally, in January 2016, Mario Caruso left the party and formed Popular Civil Italy, leaving senator Mauro as the only remaining member of Parliament of the party.

In March 2017, the PpI made an alliance agreement with Forza Italia, therefore Mauro joined that party's group in the Senate.

In 2018, the party participated in the Molise regional election within the centre-right coalition, gaining 7.1% of vote and two seats.

In the 2023 regional elections in Molise, Populars for Italy secured 6.8% of the vote; the party’s vice-president, Vincenzo Niro, was the only candidate on the list to be elected to the Molise Regional Council.

In 2023 Mauro, Dellai and Giuseppe De Mita founded a new political association, Popular Base. On 24 September, in a meeting in Marina di Grosseto, the founders of Popular Base launched their official logo, joining the family of European People's Party with a video message sent by its Chairman Manfred Weber, and they announced the next steps leading up to the constituent assembly on 3 February 2024. On 21 February 2025, Popular Base was officially admitted as a member of the EPP, inheriting the PpI membership, with Mauro appointed as international secretary of the party.

On 18 September 2025 the PpI were dissolved, as they asked to be removed from the official political party register.

== Electoral results ==
=== European Parliament ===
Election	Leader	Votes	%	Seats	+/–	EP Group
2019	Mario Mauro	80,553	0.30	0 / 76	New	–

=== Regional Councils ===
Region	Election year	Votes	%	Seats	+/−
Marche	2015	18,109 (Note: In a joint list with Union of the Centre, that elected one councilor)	3.41	0 / 31	–
Molise	2023	9,666	6.84	1 / 21	▼1
Campania	2015	17,475 (Note: In a joint list with Italian Republican Party)	0.76	0 / 51	–
Apulia	2015	6,575	0.41	0 / 51	–

== Leadership ==
- President: Mario Mauro (2014–2025)
  - Vice President: Potito Salatto (2014–2016), Isabella Poldrugo (2014–2025), Vincenzo Niro (2014–2025)
