= Marcello Veneziale =

Italian magistrate and politician

Mayor of Isernia
- In office 27 February 1993 – 29 June 1995
- Preceded by: Domenico Testa
- Succeeded by: Giuseppe Caterina

Member of the Regional Council of Molise
- In office 29 May 1995 – 17 April 2000

President of Molise
- In office 7 June 1995 – 20 November 1998
- Preceded by: Giovanni Di Giandomenico
- Succeeded by: Angelo Michele Iorio
- In office 11 May 1999 – 17 April 2000
- Preceded by: Angelo Michele Iorio
- Succeeded by: Giovanni Di Stasi

Personal details
- Born: 20 April 1941 (age 85) Naples, Campania, Italy
- Party: Independent (centre-left)
- Occupation: Magistrate

Marcello Veneziale (born 20 April 1941) was an Italian magistrate and politician who served as Mayor of Isernia (1993–1995) and President of Molise for two terms (1995–1998, 1999–2000).

Political offices
Preceded by Domenico Testa	Mayor of Isernia; 1993–1995	Succeeded by Giuseppe Caterina
Preceded by Giovanni Di Giandomenico	President of Molise; 1995–1998	Succeeded by Angelo Michele Iorio
Preceded by Angelo Michele Iorio	President of Molise; 1999–2000	Succeeded by Giovanni Di Stasi
