= 1985 Molise regional election =

4th election of the Council and of the president of the Molise Region

The Molise regional election of 1985 took place on 12 May 1985.

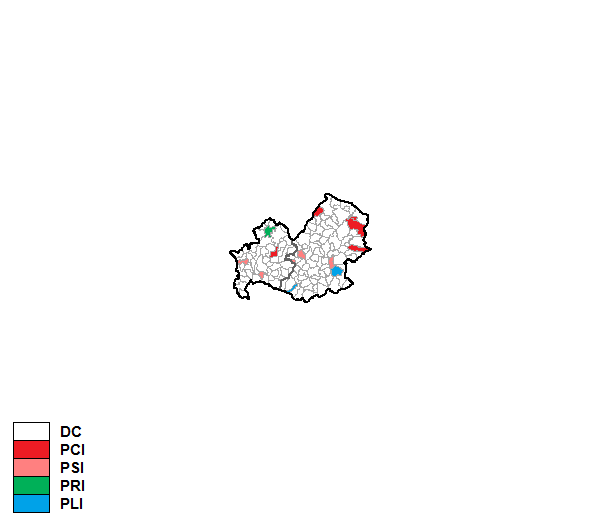
Largest party by municipality

== Events ==
Christian Democracy was by far the largest party, gaining more than three times the share of vote of the Italian Communist Party, which came distantly second.

After the election Christian Democrat Paolo Nuvoli was elected President of the Region. In 1988 Nuvoli was replaced by fellow Christian Democrat Ferdinando Di Laura Frattura.

== Results ==
Parties	votes	votes (%)	seats
Christian Democracy	122,268	56.5	18
Italian Communist Party	35,097	16.2	5
Italian Socialist Party	22,173	10.2	3
Italian Democratic Socialist Party	10,648	4.9	1
Italian Social Movement	8,866	4.1	1
Italian Republican Party	7,436	3.4	1
Italian Liberal Party	6,524	3.0	1
Proletarian Democracy	2,278	1.1	-
Pensioners Italian Alliance – Venetian League	813	0.4	-
Valdostan Union – Democratic Party – others	336	0.2	-
Total	216,439	100.0	30

Source: Ministry of the Interior
