= 2011 Molise regional election =

Italian regional election

← 2006	16–17 October 2011	2013 →

All 30 seats to the Regional Council of Molise
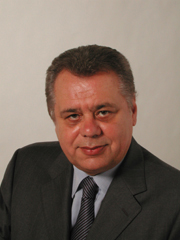

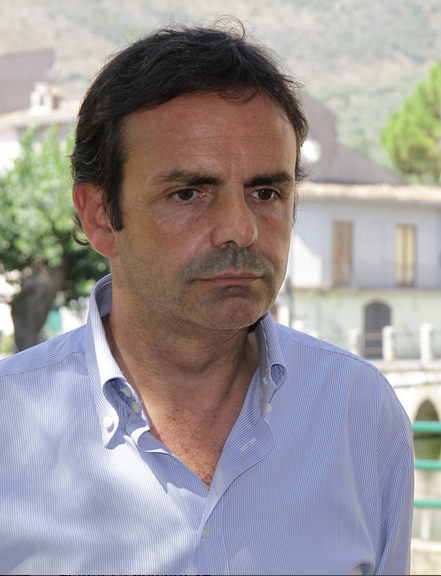
	Majority party	Minority party
Leader	Michele Iorio	Paolo Di Laura Frattura
Party	People of Freedom	Democratic Party
Alliance	Centre-right	Centre-left
Seats won	18	12
Seat change	Steady	Steady
Popular vote	89,142	87,637
Percentage	47.0%	46.2%
Swing	▼7.0%	▲0.2%
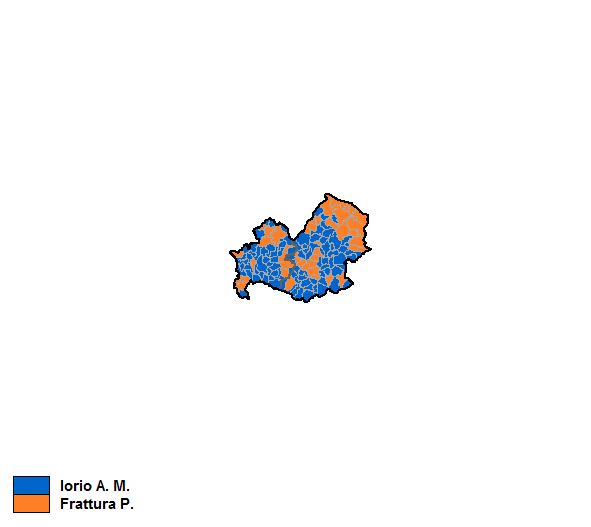
President before election
Michele Iorio
People of Freedom
Elected President
Election results annulled
New elections held in February 2013

The Molise regional election of 2011 took place on 16–17 October 2011.

Michele Iorio (PdL) narrowly defeated Paolo Di Laura Frattura (PD) and secured a third consecutive term as President of Molise.

In May 2012 a tribunal declared the election invalid due to irregularities committed by Iorio and his centre-right coalition. Finally, the Italian Council of State confirmed this election as invalid on 29 October 2012 and the new elections were held in February 2013.

== Results ==
Candidates & parties	votes	votes (%)	seats reg. list	seats prov. lists
Michele Iorio	89,142	46.94	3	15
The People of Freedom	33,911	18.86	→	5
Project Molise	17,117	9.51	→	2
Union of the Centre	12,193	6.78	→	2
Alliance of the Centre	12,113	6.73	→	2
Great South	11,755	6.53	→	2
Civil Molise	7,940	4.41	→	1
UDEUR–Populars for the South	6,332	3.52	→	1
Paolo Di Laura Frattura	87,637	46.15	1	11
Democratic Party	17,735	9.86	→	3
Italy of Values	15,907	8.84	→	3
Alliance for Italy	11,354	6.31	→	1
Italian Socialist Party	8,246	4.58	→	1
Democratic Participation – Building Democracy	7,623	4.23	→	1
Left Ecology Freedom	6,961	3.87	→	1
Federation of the Left	4,977	2.76	→	1
Antonio Federico	10,650	5.60	–	0
Five Star Movement	4,083	2.27	→	0
Giovancarmine Mancini	2,458	1.29	–	0
The Right–Laical Pole (New PSI–PSDI)	1,556	0.86	→	0
Total	189,887	100.00	4	26

Sources: Ministry of the Interior – Historical Archive of Elections

== See also ==
- List of annulled elections
