= 1990 Molise regional election =

The Molise regional election of 1990 took place on 6 and 7 May 1990.

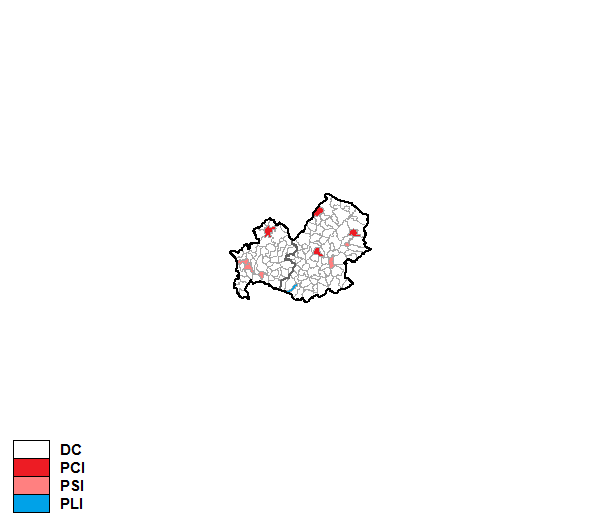
Largest party by municipality

== Events ==
Christian Democracy was by far the largest party, gaining more than four times the share of vote of the Italian Communist Party, which came distantly second.

After the election Christian Democrat Enrico Santoro was elected President of the Region. In 1992 Santoro was replaced by fellow Christian Democrat Luigi Di Bartolomeo and later by Giovanni Di Giandomenico.

== Results ==
Parties	votes	votes (%)	seats
Christian Democracy	130,137	58.9	19
Italian Communist Party	31,432	14.2	4
Italian Socialist Party	26,391	12.0	4
Italian Democratic Socialist Party	7,705	3.5	1
Italian Social Movement	7,287	3.3	1
Italian Republican Party	6,615	3.0	1
Italian Liberal Party	5,642	2.6	-
Green List	3,065	1.4	-
Proletarian Democracy	1,211	0.6	-
Antiprohibitionists on Drugs	906	0.4	-
Centre League Molise	398	0.2	-
Total	220,789	100.0	30

Source: Ministry of the Interior
