= 2000 Molise regional election =

- 16 April 2000

All 30 seats to the Regional Council of Molise
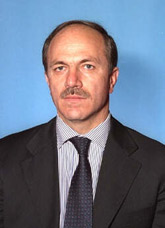

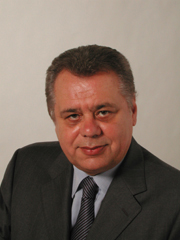
	Majority party	Minority party
Leader	Giovanni Di Stasi	Michele Iorio
Party	DS	Forza Italia
Alliance	The Olive Tree	Pole for Freedoms
Seats won	18	12
Seat change	Steady	Steady
Popular vote	101,295	100,365
Percentage	49.0%	48.6%
Swing	▼2.5%	▼0.9%
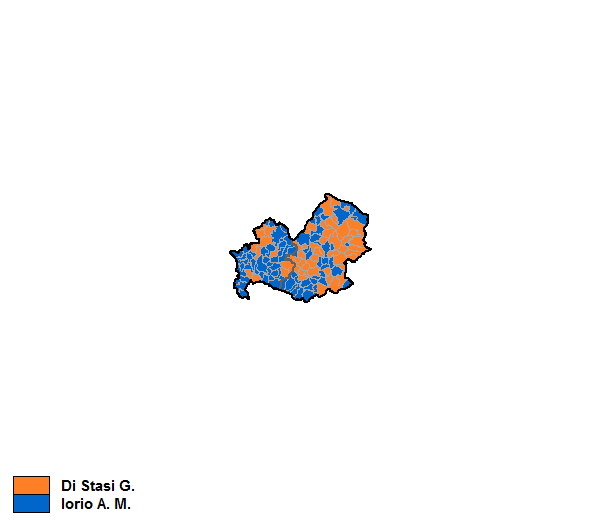
President before election
Marcello Veneziale
The Olive Tree
Elected President
Giovanni Di Stasi
DS

The Molise regional election of 2000 took place on 16 April 2000.

Giovanni Di Stasi (Democrats of the Left) was narrowly elected president, defeating Michele Iorio (Forza Italia). Due to irregularities in the vote, an early election was held a year later, on 11 November 2001.

== Results ==
Candidates & parties	votes	votes (%)	seats reg. list	seats prov. lists
Giovanni Di Stasi	101,295	49.02	6	12
Democrats of the Left	27,800	13.88	→	4
The Democrats	22,328	11.15	→	3
Italian People's Party	19,125	9.55	→	2
Union of Democrats for Europe	7,960	3.98	→	1
Italian Democratic Socialists	6,737	3.36	→	1
Communist Refoundation Party	5,207	2.60	→	1
Party of Italian Communists	4,515	2.25	→	-
Federation of the Greens	2,187	1.09	→	-
Michele Iorio	100,365	48.57	1	11
Forza Italia	39,015	19.49	→	5
National Alliance	20,522	10.25	→	2
Christian Democratic Centre	14,902	7.44	→	2
United Christian Democrats	13,461	6.72	→	1
Socialist Party	6,108	3.05	→	1
Progressive People's Party	4,362	2.18	→	1
The Liberals-Sgarbi	2,484	1.24	→	-
Saturnino Carrozzelli	2,797	1.40	-	-
Tricolour Flame–National Front	2,113	1.06	→	-
Donato De Renzis	2,191	1.06	-	-
Bonino List	1,402	0.70	→	-
Total	206,648	100.00	7	23

Source: Ministry of the Interior
