= Paolo Di Laura Frattura =

Italian politician

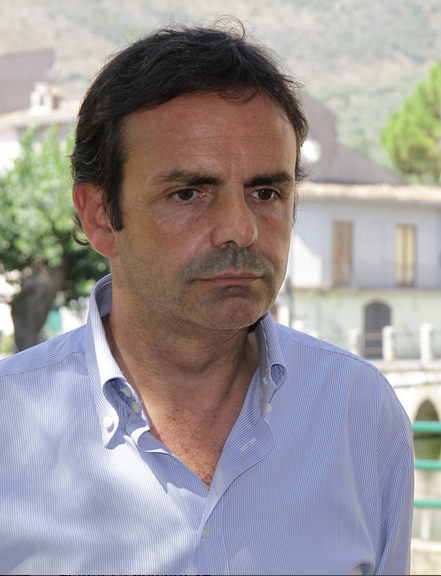

President of Molise
- In office 18 March 2013 – 8 May 2018
- Preceded by: Angelo Michele Iorio
- Succeeded by: Donato Toma

Personal details
- Born: 4 July 1962 (age 63) Campobasso, Italy
- Party: Democratic Party

Paolo Di Laura Frattura (born July 4, 1962 in Campobasso) is an Italian politician and member of the Democratic Party.

Centre-left coalition nominee for President of Molise in 2011 regional election, he lost that election against incumbent President Angelo Michele Iorio (PdL) with a small margin. In the 2013 early regional election Frattura run again against Iorio: in this election Iorio lost re-election to Frattura. Frattura has served as the President of the Italian region of Molise from 2013 to 2018, when he decided to not run for a second term in the April 2018 regional election (6 week after March 2018 Italian general election when the centre-left coalition arrived only third in the national vote and also in Molise).

His father, Fernando Di Laura Frattura, also served as the President of Molise from 1988 to 1990.

Political offices
Preceded by Angelo Michele Iorio (PdL)	President of Molise; 2013-2018	Succeeded by Donato Toma (FI)
Party political offices
Preceded by Roberto Ruta (DL); 2006	Centre-left coalition nominee for President of Molise; 2011 and 2013	Succeeded by Carlo Veneziale (PD); 2018
