= Building Democracy =

Building Democracy Costruire Democrazia
- Leader: Massimo Romano
- Founded: September 2009
- Ideology: Regionalism
- Colors
- Regional Council of Molise: 1 / 21

The Building Democracy (Costruire Democrazia) is a political party based in Molise, Italy.

== History ==
The party was founded in September 2009 by the lawyer Massimo Romano, former member of Italy of Values. In 2011 Romano ran in the primary elections to choose the centre-left candidate for president, which Frattura later won. In the 2011 Molise regional election, Building Democracy, within the centre-left coalition, won 4.23% of the vote and one seat (assigned to Romano).

The party took part in the 2013 Italian general election, obtaining only 2,635 votes for the Senate. In the same year, it also took part in the 2013 Molise regional election within a coalition of civic lists, obtaining 5.07% of the vote and one seat (assigned, in this occasion, to Filippo Monaco).

After a period of inactivity, Building Democracy participates again in the 2023 Molise regional election, within the centre-left coalition, obtaining 5.73% of the votes and one seat (won by the leader Massimo Romano).

In the 2024 local elections, Building Democracy presents its two mayoral candidates in the cities of Campobasso and Termoli. In Campobasso, the mayoral candidate of Costruire Democracy, Pino Ruta, supported by a civic coalition formed by Costruire Democracy, Civic Confederation and Unica Terra, obtained 19.9% and did not reach the run-off. Building Democracy gets 9.8%. During the runoff, Pino Ruta's coalition supported the center-left mayoral candidate Marialuisa Forte, winning and obtaining 4 seats in the city council and 3 assessors, including the deputy mayor. Instead, in Termoli, presenting its mayoral candidate Settimio Andrea Montesanto, Building Democracy obtained 3.6%, barely exceeding the threshold of 4%.

== Electoral results ==
=== Italian Parliament ===
Election	Leader	Senate of the Republic			
Election	Leader	Votes	%	Seats	+/−
2013	Massimo Romano	2,635	0.01	0 / 315	New

=== Regional elections ===
Region	Election	Votes	%	Seats	+/−	Status in legislature
Molise	2011	7,623 (11th)	4.23	1 / 30	▲1	Opposition
Molise	2013	8,503 (9th)	5.07	1 / 21	0	Opposition
Molise	2023	8,105 (9th)	5.73	1 / 21	▲1	Opposition

=== Local elections ===
City	Election	Votes	%	Seats	+/−	Status in legislature
Campobasso	2024	2,551 (5th)	9.79	4 / 32	▲4	Majority/Opposition
Termoli	2024	617 (11th)	3.62	0 / 24	0	Opposition
