= 1970 Molise regional election =

Regional election in Molise, Italy

The Molise regional election of 1970 took place on 7–8 June 1970.

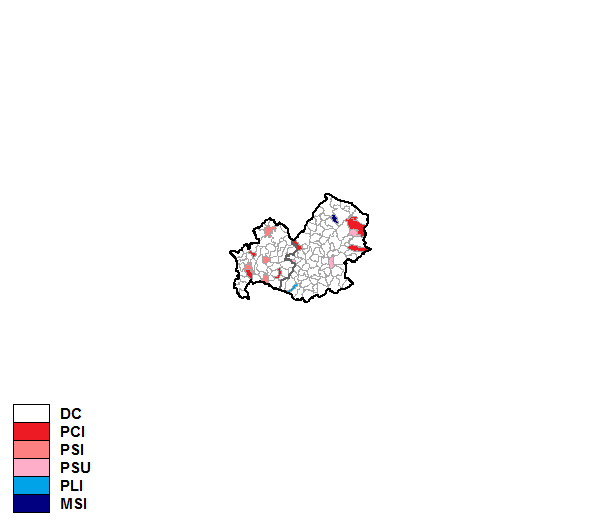
Largest party by municipality

== Events ==
Christian Democracy was by far the largest party, gaining more than three times the share of vote of the Italian Communist Party, which came distantly second.

After the election Christian Democrat Carlo Vitale was elected President of the Region. In 1973 Vitale was replaced by Giustino D'Uva.

== Results ==
Parties	votes	votes (%)	seats
Christian Democracy	92,839	52.1	16
Italian Communist Party	26,714	15.0	5
Italian Socialist Party	16,932	9.5	3
Unitary Socialist Party	13,576	7.6	2
Italian Liberal Party	10,802	6.1	2
Italian Social Movement	8,022	4.5	1
Italian Republican Party	5,298	3.0	-
Italian Socialist Party of Proletarian Unity	4,078	2.3	-
Total	178,261	100.0	30

Source: Ministry of the Interior
