= Francesco Roberti (politician) =

Italian politician

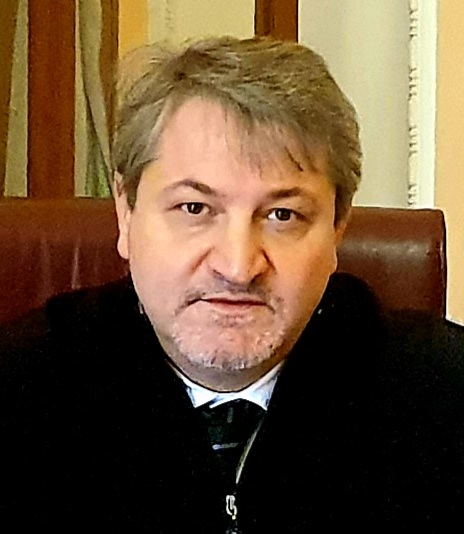

President of Molise
- Incumbent
- Assumed office 6 July 2023
- Preceded by: Donato Toma

President of the Province of Campobasso
- In office 3 September 2019 – 6 July 2023
- Preceded by: Antonio Battista
- Succeeded by: Giuseppe Puchetti

Mayor of Termoli
- In office 9 June 2019 – 7 August 2023
- Preceded by: Angelo Sbrocca
- Succeeded by: Nicola Antonio Balice

Personal details
- Born: 15 June 1967 (age 59) Montefalcone nel Sannio, Molise, Italy
- Party: Forza Italia (since 2013)
- Other political affiliations: Forza Italia (until 2009); PdL (2009-2013)
- Education: University of Florence
- Profession: Engineer, teacher

Francesco Roberti (born 15 June 1967) is an Italian politician and current president of Molise.

== Biography ==
Graduated in electronic engineering at the University of Florence, Roberti specialized in construction engineering, enrolled in the order of the province of Campobasso, and became a professor of electronics at the I.I.S.S. "Ettore Majorana" of Termoli.

=== Political activity ===
A member of Forza Italia since its foundation, Roberti was elected city councilor in Termoli in 2002, a position he held until June 2019, when he was elected mayor representing the centre-right coalition.

The following September, he was elected President of the Province of Campobasso.

==== President of Molise ====
On the occasion of the 2023 regional elections, Roberti became the official candidate of the centre-right for the office of President of Molise, being elected with 62% of the votes in an electoral round characterized by very heavy abstention.
