= 1975 Molise regional election =

The Molise regional election of 1975 took place on 15 June 1975.

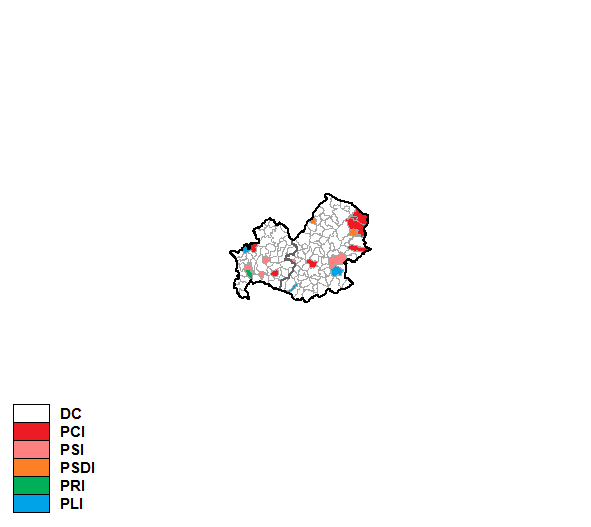
Largest party by municipality

== Events ==
Christian Democracy was by far the largest party, gaining almost than three times the share of vote of the Italian Communist Party, which came distantly second.

After the election he was elected President of the Region: the Christian Democrat Florindo D'Aimmo.

== Results ==
Parties	votes	votes (%)	seats
Christian Democracy	99,785	50.0	16
Italian Communist Party	35,675	17.9	6
Italian Socialist Party	20,090	10.1	3
Italian Democratic Socialist Party	12,384	6.2	2
Italian Social Movement	9,958	5.0	1
Italian Republican Party	8,995	4.5	1
Italian Liberal Party	8,902	4.5	1
Proletarian Democracy	2,335	1.2	-
Independents	1,419	0.7	-
Total	199,543	100.0	30

Source: Ministry of the Interior
