= Fernando Di Laura Frattura =

Italian politician (1932–2015)

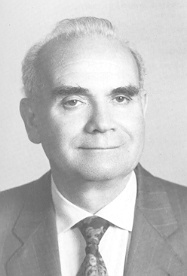
Fernando Di Laura

Fernando Di Laura Frattura (24 May 1932 – 9 September 2015) was an Italian politician. He served as the President of Molise, a region in southern Italy, from 1988 until 1990, as well as a member of the national Chamber of Deputies from 1992 to 1994 during the Eleventh Legislature. He was a prominent member of the former Christian Democracy Party (DC). He is the father of Paolo Di Laura Frattura (PD), who has served as President of Molise from 2013 to 2018. Fernando Di Laura Frattura was born in Alfedena, Province of L'Aquila, Abruzzo, in 1932. He died in Campobasso, Molise, on September 6, 2015, at the age of 83. Before his death, he had undergone surgery.
