= 1980 Molise regional election =

The Molise regional election of 1980 took place on 8 June 1980.

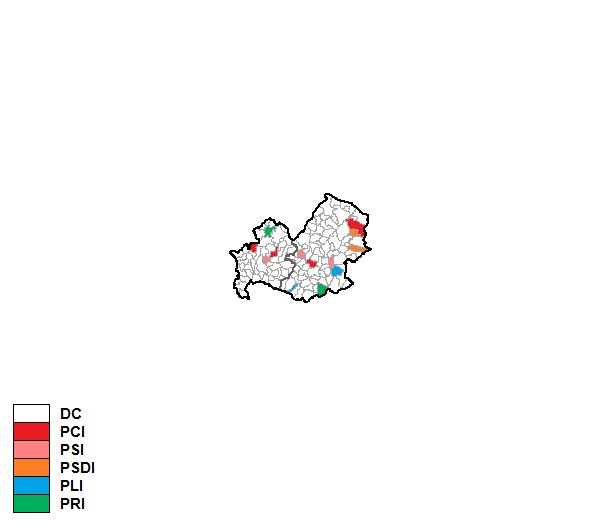
Largest party by municipality

== Events ==
Christian Democracy was by far the largest party, gaining more than three times the share of vote of the Italian Communist Party, which came distantly second.

After the election Florindo D'Aimmo, the incumbent Christian Democratic President, was re-elected, but he was replaced by Giustino D'Uva in 1982 and later by Ulderico Colagiovanni in 1984.

== Results ==
Parties	votes	votes (%)	seats
Christian Democracy	112,985	55.4	17
Italian Communist Party	32,049	15.7	5
Italian Socialist Party	19,101	9.4	3
Italian Democratic Socialist Party	9,791	4.8	2
Italian Liberal Party	8,351	4.1	1
Italian Social Movement	8,261	4.1	1
Italian Republican Party	7,588	3.7	1
New Molisan Left	2,597	1.3	-
Proletarian Unity Party	1,556	0.8	-
Molisan Artisans Merchants	1,553	0.8	-
Total	203,832	100.0	30

Source: Ministry of the Interior
