= 2013 Molise regional election =

- 24–25 February 2013

All 21 seats to the Regional Council of Molise
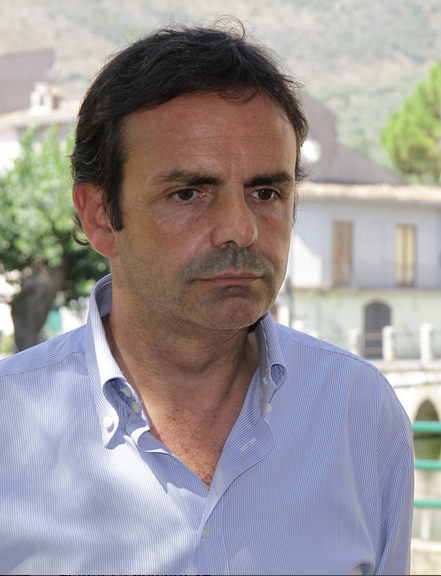

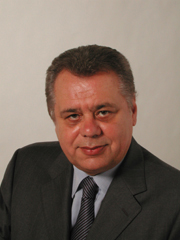

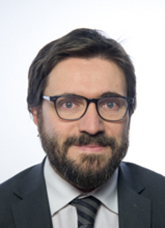
	Majority party	Minority party	Third party
Leader	Paolo Di Laura Frattura	Michele Iorio	Antonio Federico
Party	Democratic Party	People of Freedom	Five Star Movement
Alliance	Centre-left	Centre-right
Seats won	12	5	2
Seat change	Steady	▼13	▲2
Popular vote	85,881	49,567	32,200
Percentage	44.7%	25.8%	16.8%
Swing	▼1.5%	▼21.2%	▲11.2%
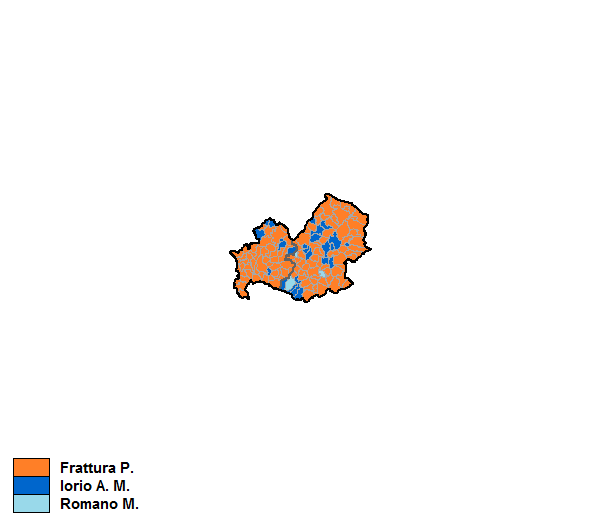
President before election
Michele Iorio
People of Freedom
Elected President
Paolo Di Laura Frattura
Democratic Party

The Molise regional election of 2013 took place on 24–25 February 2013, after that the 2011–2016 legislature was prematurely dissolved due to irregularities in the 2011 regional election. Paolo di Laura Frattura of the Democratic Party was elected president and the center-left performed approximately 16 points better than the center-left list for the Chamber of Deputies in the general election held the same day.

== Background ==
In May 2012 a tribunal declared the 2011 election invalid due to irregularities and fraud committed by Michele Iorio (People of Freedom, President of Molise since 2001) and his center-right coalition. After an appeal filed by the center-right failed, the Italian Council of State confirmed the 2011 election as invalid on 29 October 2012 and a new election was scheduled for February 2013.

== Results ==
Candidates	Regional lists			Provincial lists				Total
Candidates	votes	%	seats	Parties	votes	%	seats	group
Paolo di Laura Frattura	85,881	44.70	3	Democratic Party	24,892	14.84	3	12
Paolo di Laura Frattura	85,881	44.70	3	Rise Molise	14,282	8.51	1	12
Paolo di Laura Frattura	85,881	44.70	3	Italy of Values	12,156	7.25	1	12
Paolo di Laura Frattura	85,881	44.70	3	Union for Molise	11,022	6.57	1	12
Paolo di Laura Frattura	85,881	44.70	3	Union of Democrats for Europe	6,831	4.07	1	12
Paolo di Laura Frattura	85,881	44.70	3	Party of Italian Communists	5,512	3.29	1	12
Paolo di Laura Frattura	85,881	44.70	3	Left Ecology Freedom	5,015	2.99	1	12
Paolo di Laura Frattura	85,881	44.70	3	Italian Socialist Party	3,149	1.88	0	12
Paolo di Laura Frattura	85,881	44.70	3	We for Molise	1,282	0.76	-	12
Michele Iorio	49,567	25.80	1	The People of Freedom	17,310	10.32	2	5
Michele Iorio	49,567	25.80	1	Union of the Centre	10,514	6.27	1	5
Michele Iorio	49,567	25.80	1	Great South	8,565	5.10	1	5
Michele Iorio	49,567	25.80	1	Project Molise	7,383	4.40	-	5
Michele Iorio	49,567	25.80	1	The Right	2,440	1.45	-	5
Antonio Federico	32,200	16.76	-	Five Star Movement	20,437	12.18	2	2
Massimo Romano	21.160	11.0	-	Building Democracy	8,503	5.07	1	1
Massimo Romano	21.160	11.0	-	Act Molise	4,941	2.94	0	1
Massimo Romano	21.160	11.0	-	Democrats for Molise	1,114	0.66	0	1
Antonio De Lellis	2,158	1.12	-	Democratic Revolution	1,562	0.93	0	–
Camillo Colella	1,141	0.59	-	Work, Sport and Social	873	0.52	0	–
Total candidates	192,107	100.00	5	Total parties	167,783	100.00	16	21

Source: Ministry of the Interior
