= Donato Toma =

Italian politician

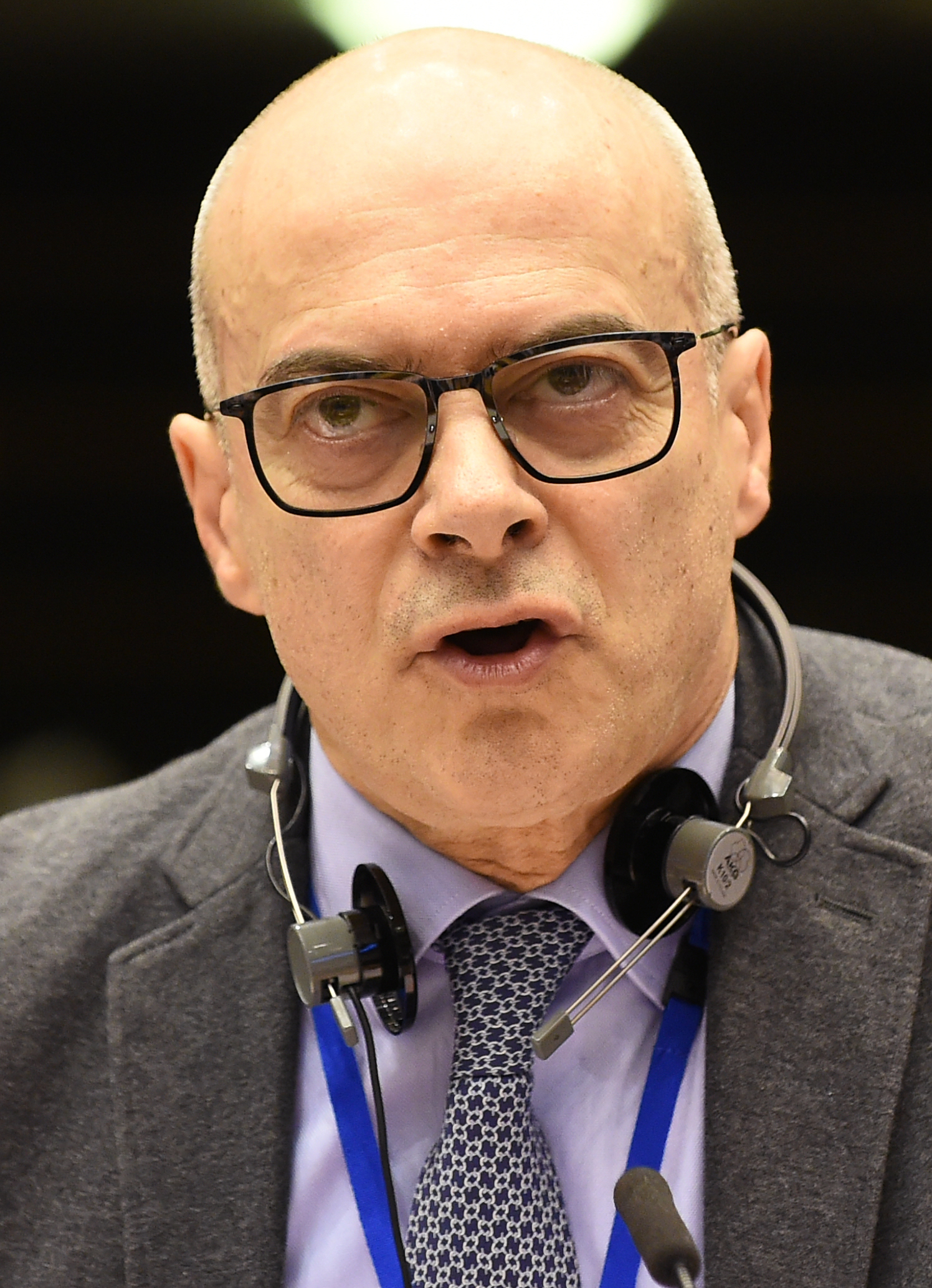

President of Molise
- In office 8 May 2018 – 6 July 2023
- Preceded by: Paolo Di Laura Frattura
- Succeeded by: Francesco Roberti

Personal details
- Born: 4 December 1957 (age 68) Naples, Italy
- Party: Forza Italia
- Education: University of Naples Federico II
- Profession: Business consultant, politician

Donato Toma (born 4 December 1957) is an Italian politician, president of Molise from 2018 to 2023.

== Biography ==
Toma graduated in Economy at the University of Naples Federico II and became a business consultant, teaching also at the University of Molise. He served as an officer in the Carabinieri with the rank of Lieutenant.

After having been Assessor for Budget in Campobasso and in Bojano, at the 2018 regional elections, Toma has been elected President of Molise, supported by Forza Italia, the Northern League, Brothers of Italy and Us with Italy.
