= 2001 Molise regional election =

- 11 November 2001

All 30 seats to the Regional Council of Molise
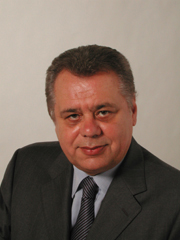

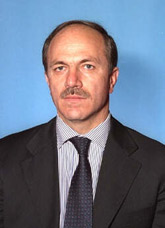
| | Majority party | Minority party |
|---|---|---|
| Leader | Michele Iorio | Giovanni Di Stasi |
| Party | Forza Italia | DS |
| Alliance | House of Freedoms | The Olive Tree |
| Seats won | 18 | 12 |
| Seat change | ▲6 | ▼6 |
| Popular vote | 115,714 | 83,089 |
| Percentage | 58.2% | 41.8% |
| Swing | ▲9.6% | ▼7.2% |
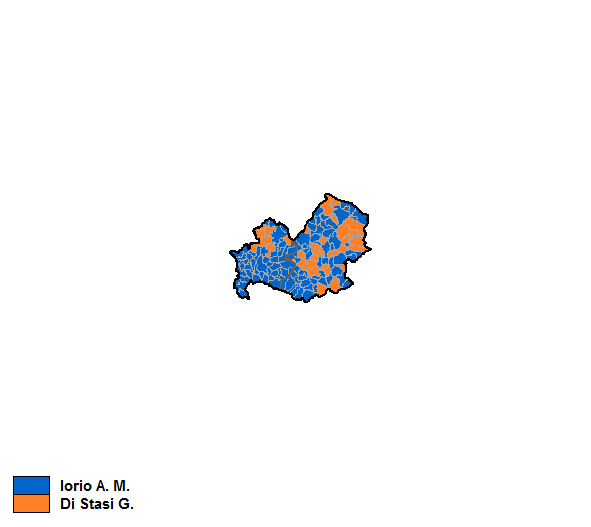
President before election
Giovanni Di Stasi
DS
Elected President
Michele Iorio
Forza Italia

The Molise regional election of 2001 took place on 11 November 2001. It was an early election as the 2000 regional election was invalidated due to irregularities in the vote.

The election consisted in a re-proposition of the 2000 race, but this time Michele Iorio (Forza Italia) defeated incumbent Giovanni Di Stasi (Democrats of the Left) by a landslide.

== Results ==
| Candidates & parties | votes | votes (%) | seats reg. list | seats prov. lists |
|---|---|---|---|---|
| Michele Iorio | 115,714 | 58.21 | 3 | 15 |
| Forza Italia | 43,573 | 22.93 | → | 6 |
| Christian Democratic Centre–United Christian Democrats | 25,812 | 13.58 | → | 3 |
| European Democracy | 24,281 | 12.78 | → | 3 |
| National Alliance | 20,302 | 10.68 | → | 3 |
| Tricolour Flame | 1,469 | 0.77 | → | 0 |
| Socialists–The Liberals-Sgarbi | 1,068 | 0.57 | → | 0 |
| Giovanni Di Stasi | 83,089 | 41.79 | 1 | 11 |
| Democracy is Freedom – The Daisy | 27,717 | 14.59 | → | 4 |
| Democrats of the Left | 22,838 | 12.02 | → | 4 |
| Italy of Values | 8,852 | 4.66 | → | 1 |
| Communist Refoundation Party | 6,640 | 3.49 | → | 1 |
| Federation of the Greens–Party of Italian Communists | 5,313 | 2.80 | → | 1 |
| Italian Democratic Socialists | 2,154 | 1,13 | → | 1 |
| Total | 198,803 | 100.00 | 4 | 26 |

Source: Ministry of the Interior
