= 2006 Molise regional election =

- 5–6 November 2006

All 30 seats to the Regional Council of Molise
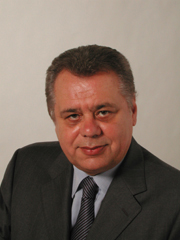

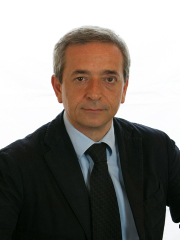
	Majority party	Minority party
Leader	Michele Iorio	Roberto Ruta
Party	Forza Italia	The Daisy
Alliance	House of Freedoms	The Union
Seats won	18	12
Seat change	Steady	Steady
Popular vote	111,811	95,246
Percentage	54.0%	46.0%
Swing	▼4.2%	▲3.2%
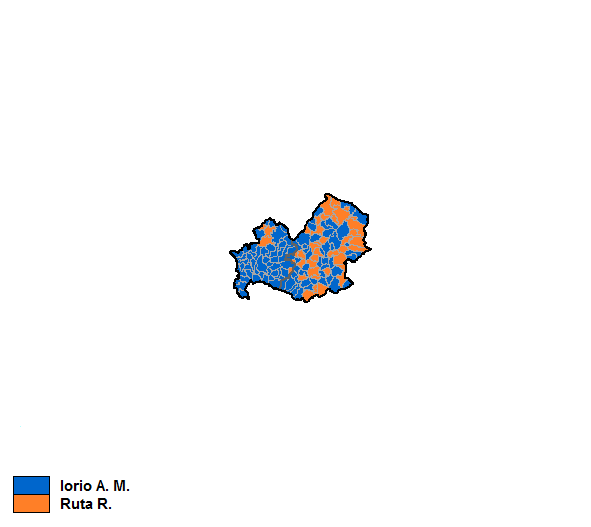
President before election
Michele Iorio
Forza Italia
Elected President
Michele Iorio
Forza Italia

The Molise regional election of 2006 took place on 5–6 November 2006.

Incumbent Michele Iorio (Forza Italia) defeated Roberto Ruta (The Daisy).

== Results ==
Candidates & parties	votes	votes (%)	seats reg. list	seats prov. lists
Michele Iorio	111,811	54.02	6	12
Forza Italia	39,610	19.84	→	5
Union of Christian and Centre Democrats	19,935	9.99	→	2
National Alliance	18,120	9.08	→	2
Christian Democracy for Autonomies	10,103	5.06	→	1
Project Molise	9,665	4.84	→	1
Civil Molise	7,473	3.74	→	1
Pensioners' Party	385	0.19	→	0
Alternative for Molise	351	0.18	→	0
Roberto Ruta	95,246	45.98	1	11
Democracy is Freedom – The Daisy	24,797	12.42	→	3
Democrats of the Left	21,766	10.90	→	3
Italy of Values	17,516	8.78	→	2
Union of Democrats for Europe	10,876	5.45	→	1
Italian Democratic Socialists	6,413	3.21	→	1
Party of Italian Communists	4,449	2.23	→	1
Communist Refoundation Party	4,442	2.23	→	0
Federation of the Greens	3,722	1.86	→	0
Total	207,127	100.00	7	23

Sources: Ministry of the Interior – Historical Archive of Elections
