= List of municipalities of the Province of Campobasso =

The following is a list of the 84 municipalities (comuni) of the Province of Campobasso in the region of Molise in Italy.

== List ==
Municipality	Population (2026)	Area (km²)	Density
Acquaviva Collecroce	536	28.60	18.7
Baranello	2,424	25.00	97.0
Bojano	7,496	52.63	142.4
Bonefro	1,128	31.28	36.1
Busso	1,142	23.81	48.0
Campobasso	47,399	56.11	844.8
Campochiaro	556	35.70	15.6
Campodipietra	2,403	19.72	121.9
Campolieto	793	24.43	32.5
Campomarino	7,974	76.68	104.0
Casacalenda	1,824	67.28	27.1
Casalciprano	424	19.07	22.2
Castelbottaccio	223	11.22	19.9
Castellino del Biferno	417	15.54	26.8
Castelmauro	1,075	43.62	24.6
Castropignano	839	26.96	31.1
Cercemaggiore	3,529	56.91	62.0
Cercepiccola	660	16.79	39.3
Civitacampomarano	277	38.89	7.1
Colle d'Anchise	709	15.69	45.2
Colletorto	1,618	35.91	45.1
Duronia	378	22.47	16.8
Ferrazzano	3,390	16.77	202.1
Fossalto	1,099	28.33	38.8
Gambatesa	1,233	43.69	28.2
Gildone	707	29.76	23.8
Guardialfiera	942	43.53	21.6
Guardiaregia	659	43.71	15.1
Guglionesi	4,874	100.95	48.3
Jelsi	1,530	28.77	53.2
Larino	6,257	88.77	70.5
Limosano	661	28.27	23.4
Lucito	616	31.56	19.5
Lupara	391	25.87	15.1
Macchia Valfortore	439	26.77	16.4
Mafalda	1,074	32.51	33.0
Matrice	1,019	20.42	49.9
Mirabello Sannitico	2,034	21.43	94.9
Molise	144	5.20	27.7
Monacilioni	439	27.21	16.1
Montagano	951	26.62	35.7
Montecilfone	1,220	22.92	53.2
Montefalcone nel Sannio	1,313	32.57	40.3
Montelongo	276	12.76	21.6
Montemitro	282	16.30	17.3
Montenero di Bisaccia	6,186	93.32	66.3
Montorio nei Frentani	342	31.66	10.8
Morrone del Sannio	505	45.84	11.0
Oratino	1,678	17.89	93.8
Palata	1,455	43.82	33.2
Petacciato	3,553	35.40	100.4
Petrella Tifernina	990	26.52	37.3
Pietracatella	1,192	50.28	23.7
Pietracupa	181	10.08	18.0
Portocannone	2,323	13.11	177.2
Provvidenti	97	14.03	6.9
Riccia	4,646	70.04	66.3
Ripabottoni	410	31.96	12.8
Ripalimosani	2,970	33.83	87.8
Roccavivara	567	21.05	26.9
Rotello	1,123	70.75	15.9
Salcito	639	28.26	22.6
San Biase	117	11.85	9.9
San Felice del Molise	525	24.37	21.5
San Giacomo degli Schiavoni	1,375	11.08	124.1
San Giovanni in Galdo	495	19.45	25.4
San Giuliano del Sannio	956	24.05	39.8
San Giuliano di Puglia	957	42.05	22.8
San Martino in Pensilis	4,365	100.66	43.4
San Massimo	825	27.33	30.2
San Polo Matese	487	15.28	31.9
Sant'Angelo Limosano	298	16.87	17.7
Sant'Elia a Pianisi	1,480	68.25	21.7
Santa Croce di Magliano	3,820	53.37	71.6
Sepino	1,815	61.37	29.6
Spinete	1,128	17.83	63.3
Tavenna	545	21.97	24.8
Termoli	31,754	55.64	570.7
Torella del Sannio	676	16.73	40.4
Toro	1,209	24.06	50.2
Trivento	4,298	73.70	58.3
Tufara	748	35.52	21.1
Ururi	2,321	31.65	73.3
Vinchiaturo	3,298	35.48	93.0

== See also ==
- List of municipalities of Molise
- List of municipalities of Italy
