= Molise (disambiguation) =

Molise is a region in southern Italy.

Molise may also refer to:

- Contado di Molise, a county in the Kingdom of Naples
- Molise, Campobasso, a village in the Province of Campobasso, Italy
