= Frosolone =

- Comune
- Comune di Frosolone
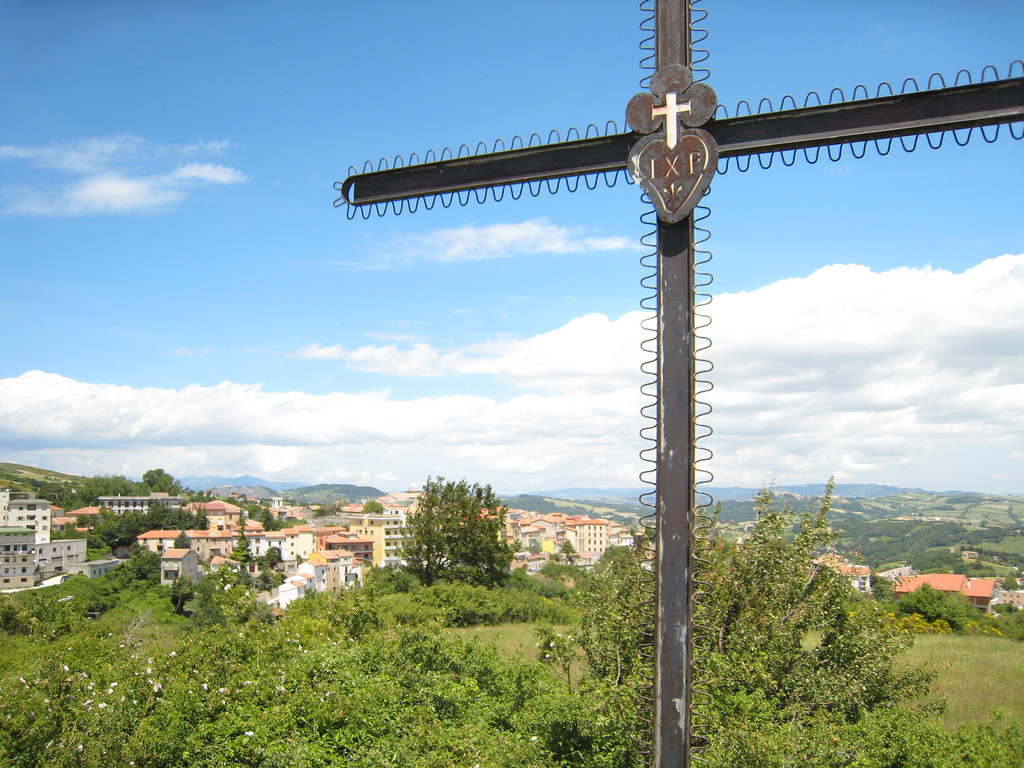
- Skyline of the comune of Frosolone

- Coat of arms

- Location within Italy Location within Molise
- Coordinates: 41°36′N 14°27′E
- Country: Italy
- Region: Molise
- Province: Isernia (IS)

Government
  - Mayor: Felice Ianiro

Area
  - Total: 49.89 km^{2} (19.26 sq mi)
- Elevation: 894 m (2,933 ft)

Population (31 August 2017)
  - Total: 3,175
  - Density: 63.64/km^{2} (164.8/sq mi)
- Demonym: Frosolonesi
- Time zone: UTC+1 (CET)
  - Summer (DST): UTC+2 (CEST)
- Postal code: 86095
- Dialing code: 0874
- Website: Official website

Frosolone is a comune (municipality) in the Province of Isernia in the Italian region Molise, located about 20 kilometres (12 mi) west of Campobasso and about 20 kilometres (12 mi) east of Isernia. It is one of I Borghi più belli d'Italia ("The most beautiful villages of Italy"). Frosolone is known historically for the production of blades, including knives and scissors, and is home to a museum dedicated to the craft.

== Geography ==
Frosolone borders the following municipalities: Carpinone, Casalciprano, Civitanova del Sannio, Duronia, Macchiagodena, Molise, Sant'Elena Sannita, Sessano del Molise, Torella del Sannio.

== History ==
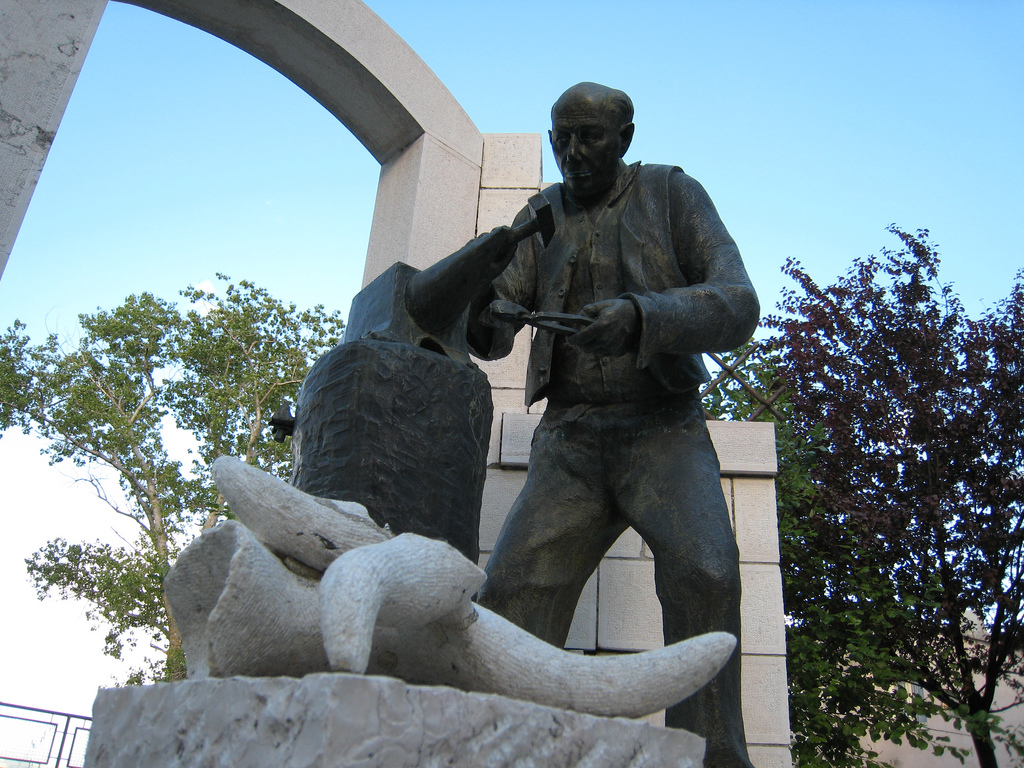
Statue in Frosolone recognizing its blacksmithing tradition.

The region surrounding Frosolone was inhabited by members of the Sanniti and Osci Italic tribes, which were conquered by the Romans during the Samnite Wars. There are remnants of cyclopean walls built by the Samnites, locally called "Civitelle." As the name implies, they were likely part of a small fortress destroyed by the Roman Army probably in 293 BC; the historian Livy describes in this area the march of two Roman armies, headed by Spurius Carvilius Maximus and Lucius Papirius Cursor.

The first mention of the town's name is in a "diploma" dated 1064, by the Count of Isernia.

The church of Santa Maria Assunta is of medieval origin. Its construction was completed probably in 1309, when it was cited for the first time in a notarial deed. On December 5, 1456, the church was totally destroyed by the 1456 Central Italy earthquakes which had an epicenter in Frosolone. Reconstruction work ended in 1531, when it was consecrated.

Frosolone was victim to another earthquake on July 26, 1805, which destroyed most of the buildings in town and killed 518 people. In 1860, Frosolone was officially annexed by the Kingdom of Italy. In 1864 the Post Office was opened; in 1866 a kerosene public lighting system was installed at the then-large outlay of 4,000 lira.

== Notable people ==
- Dominic DeNucci, professional wrestler
