= Fossalto =

- Comune
- Comune di Fossalto
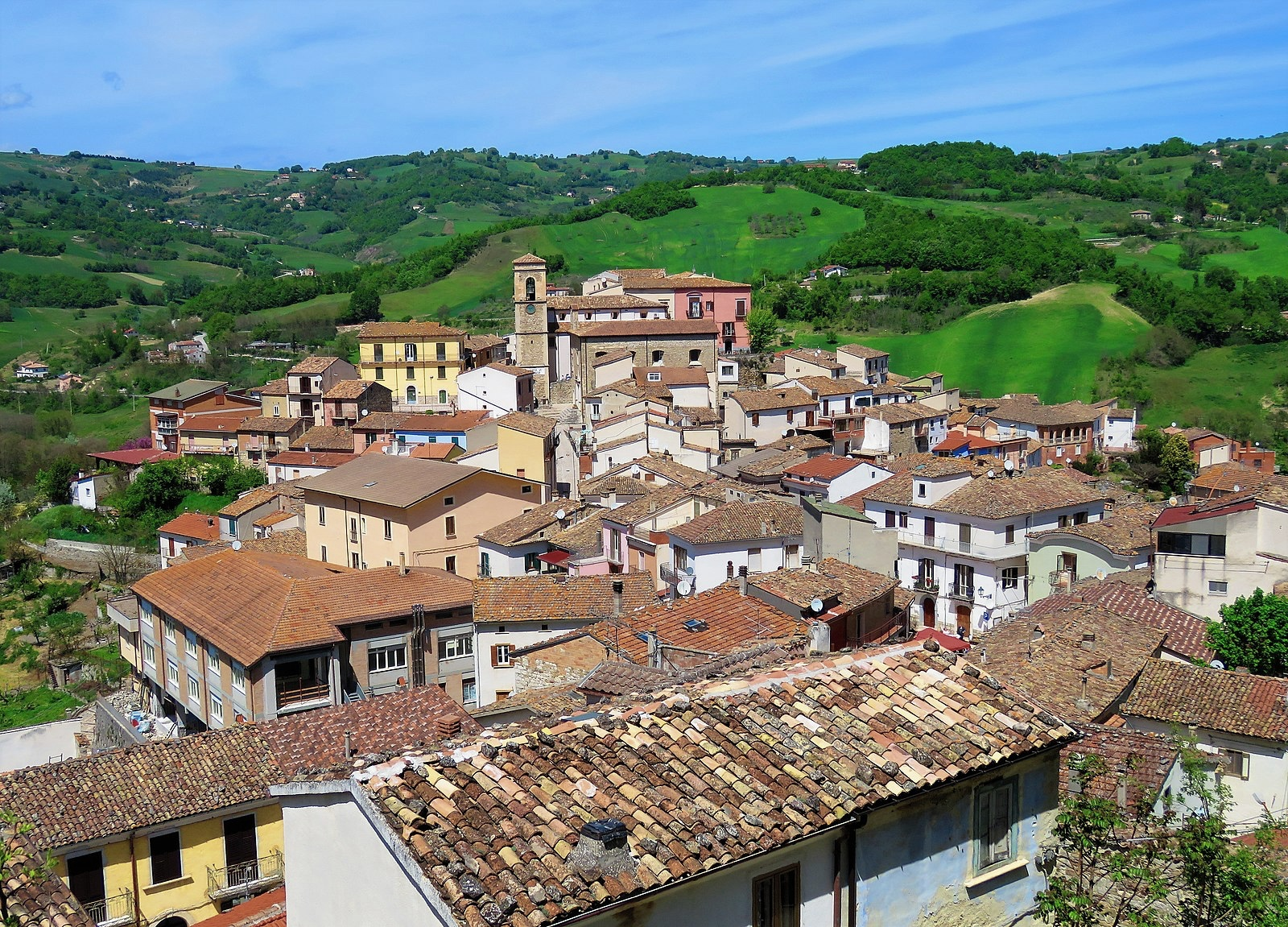
- View of Fossalto

- Location within Italy Location within Molise
- Coordinates: 41°40′N 14°33′E
- Country: Italy
- Region: Molise
- Province: Campobasso (CB)

Government
  - Mayor: Nicola Giovanni Manocchio

Area
  - Total: 28.33 km^{2} (10.94 sq mi)
- Elevation: 511 m (1,677 ft)

Population (30 November 2017)
  - Total: 1,299
  - Density: 45.85/km^{2} (118.8/sq mi)
- Demonym: Fossaltesi
- Time zone: UTC+1 (CET)
  - Summer (DST): UTC+2 (CEST)
- Postal code: 86020
- Dialing code: 0874
- Website: Official website

Fossalto is a comune (municipality) in the Province of Campobasso in the Italian region Molise, located about 15 kilometres (9 mi) northwest of Campobasso.

Fossalto borders the following municipalities: Castropignano, Limosano, Pietracupa, Salcito, Sant'Angelo Limosano, Torella del Sannio.
