= Molise, Campobasso =

Molise
- Comune
- Comune di Molise
- Location within Italy Location within Molise
- Coordinates: 41°38′N 14°30′E
- Country: Italy
- Region: Molise
- Province: Province of Campobasso (CB)

Area
  - Total: 5.2 km^{2} (2.0 sq mi)

Population (Dec. 2004)
  - Total: 179
  - Density: 34/km^{2} (89/sq mi)
- Time zone: UTC+1 (CET)
  - Summer (DST): UTC+2 (CEST)
- Postal code: 86020
- Dialing code: 0874

Molise is a comune (municipality) in the Province of Campobasso in the Italian region Molise, located about 15 kilometres (9 mi) northwest of Campobasso. As of 31 December 2004, it had a population of 179 and an area of 5.2 square kilometres (2.0 mi^{2}). It's the only comune to have the name of its region.

Molise borders the following municipalities: Duronia, Frosolone, Torella del Sannio.

== Demographic evolution ==
Historical population

Year	Pop.	±%
1861	816	—
1871	814	−0.2%
1881	823	+1.1%
1901	663	−19.4%
1911	703	+6.0%

Year	Pop.	±%
1921	612	−12.9%
1931	557	−9.0%
1936	565	+1.4%
1951	497	−12.0%
1961	405	−18.5%

Year	Pop.	±%
1971	299	−26.2%
1981	226	−24.4%
1991	191	−15.5%
2001	186	−2.6%

Source: Data from ISTAT
