= Illuminated procession =

Parade of carried lights

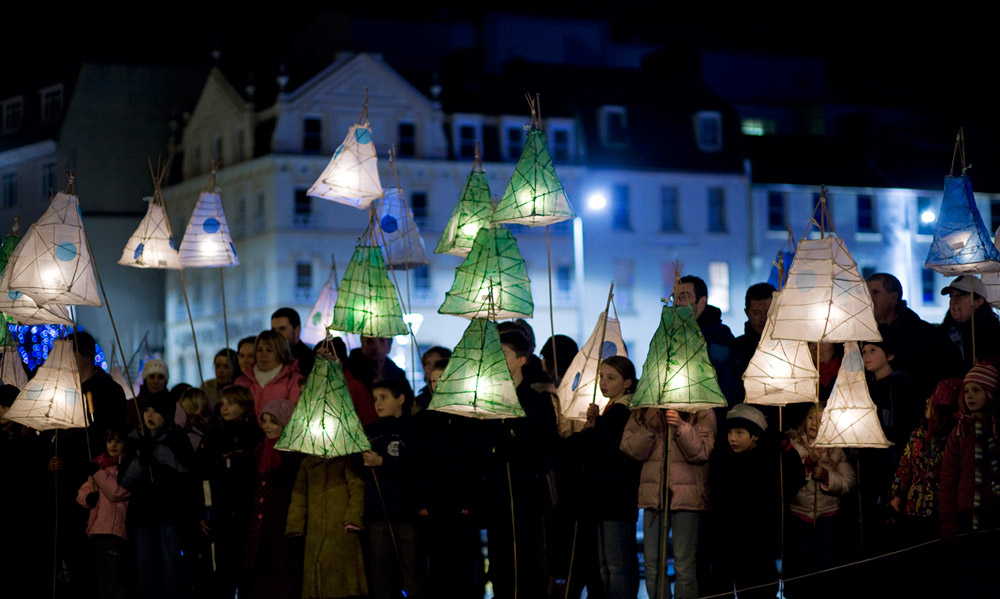
La Fête dé Noué in Jersey.

An illuminated procession is a procession held after dark so that lights carried by the participants form a spectacle. The lights will commonly be of the same type, so making a candlelight procession, lantern parade or torchlight march.

Examples include the Christmas festival of Ndocciata in Italy; the Chinese Lantern Festival to celebrate the first full moon; and the daily procession of pilgrims to the grotto of Lourdes.

== History ==
Torchlight processions were known already in Ancient Greece where it was connected with Ancient Greek religion. Until today they are part modern adaptations of Dionysia festival in Greece and elsewhere.

== Torchlight marches in politics ==
Before the American Civil War in the U.S., illuminated processions were held to promote political parties. That includes mass torch light processions in 1858 at Hartford Connecticut, the Republican Party in New York City in 1860 and in Galesburg, Illinois in 1884.

== Winter sport excursions and parades ==
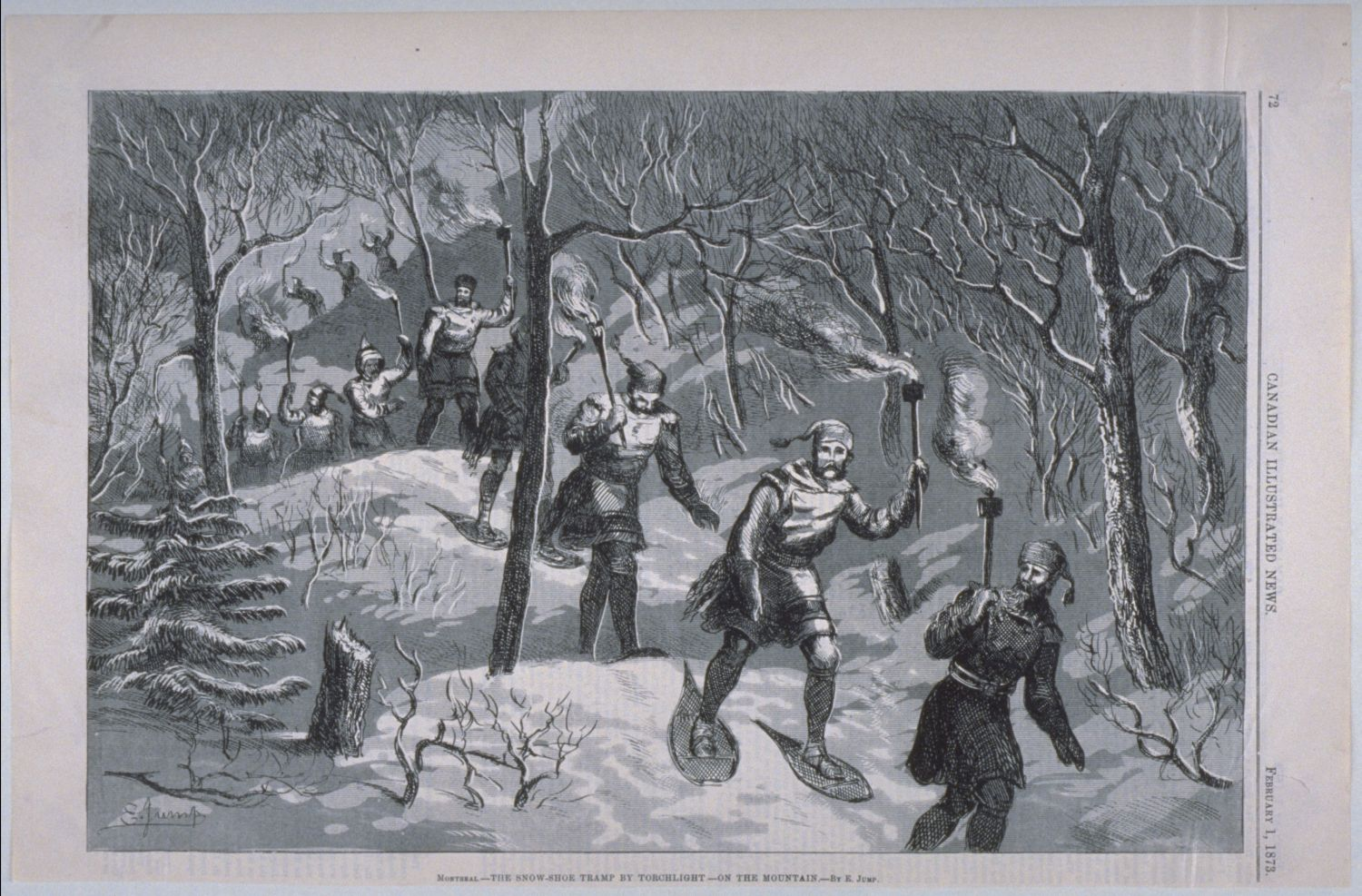
Snowshoeing at night, Montreal 1873

Snowshoe tramps by torchlight have been held in Montreal since 1873. Processions of skiers holding torches or flares while skiing down a slope at night has been a scheduled event of winter festivals since at least 1903.

== Marches by Far-right ==
Video recorded by white nationalist marchers on August 11

The Far-right and Nationalist groups have had a long history of torchlight marches.

During the 1930s Nazi Germany in some of its Nuremberg rallies used torchlight marches.

On 1 January 2014, Stepan Bandera's 105th birthday was celebrated by a torchlight procession of 15,000 people in the centre of Kyiv and thousands more rallied near his statue in Lviv. The march was supported by the far-right Svoboda party and some members of the center-right Batkivshchyna.

In 2017, During the Unite the Right rally that took place in Charlottesville, Virginia. a group of white nationalists – variously numbered from "dozens" to "about 250" – gathered for an unannounced (and unsanctioned by the city) march through the University of Virginia's campus. They marched towards the university's Lawn chanting Nazi and white supremacist slogans, including "White lives matter"; "You will not replace us"; and "Jews will not replace us". (The phrase "You will not replace us" has been reported by the Anti-Defamation League to "reflect the white supremacist world view that ... the white race is doomed to extinction by an alleged 'rising tide of color' purportedly controlled and manipulated by Jews".) The Nazi slogan "Blood and Soil" was also used. The group was primarily composed of white men, many of them wielding tiki torches.

In Estonia Conservative People's Party of Estonia The party's affiliated nationalist youth movement Blue Awakening is the main organizer of the annual torchlight march through Tallinn on 24 February, Independence Day of Estonia. The first Independence Day torchlight march was held in 2014. According to Blue Awakening, the torchlight march is meant to honor those who have fallen for the nation of Estonia and to signify that Estonian youth have not abandoned the nationalist principles. The event has been harshly criticized by the Simon Wiesenthal Center that described it as "Nuremberg-esque" and likened the ideology of the participants to that of the Estonian Nazi collaborators.

Torchlight marches by the Far Right

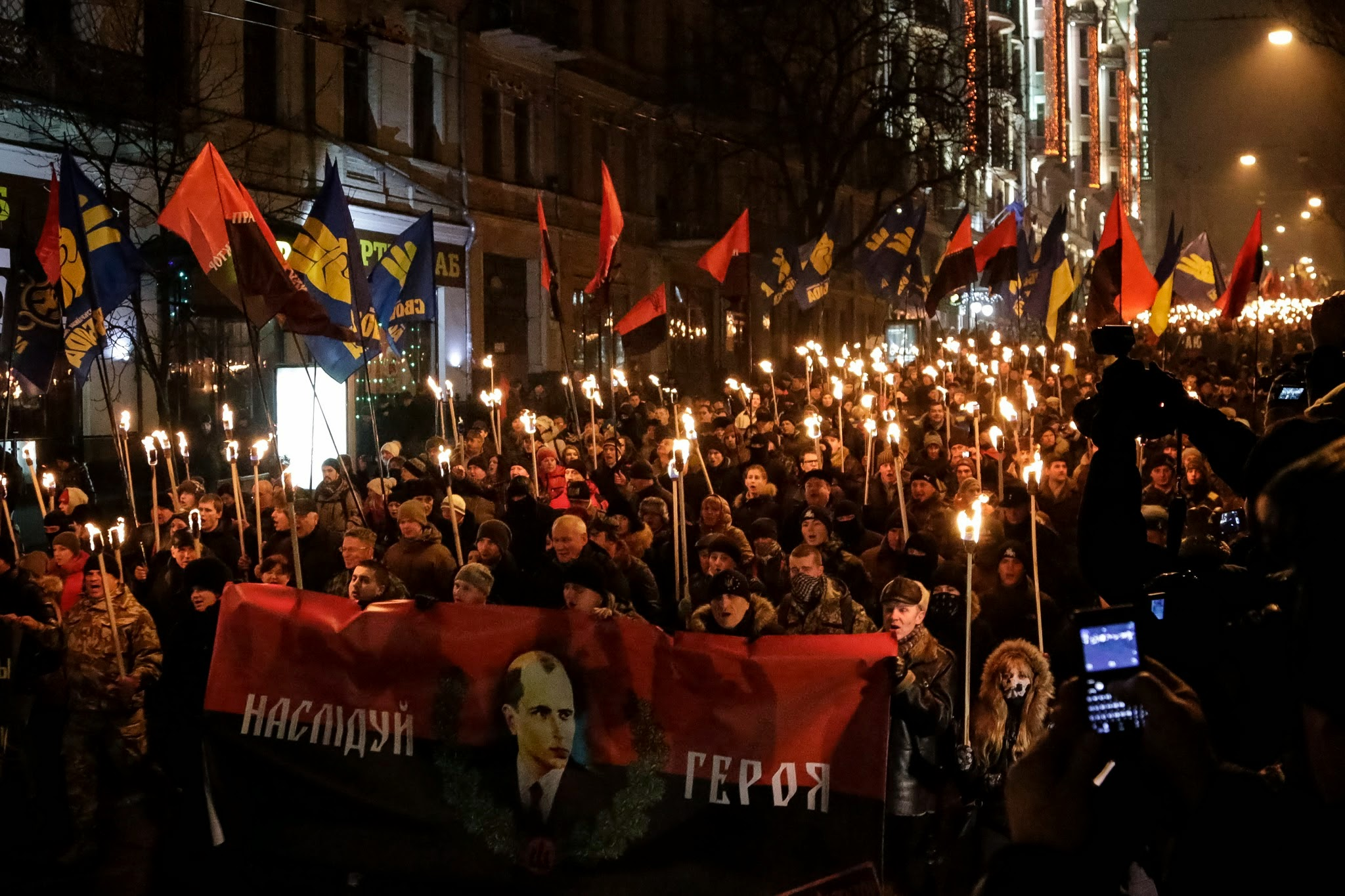
2014

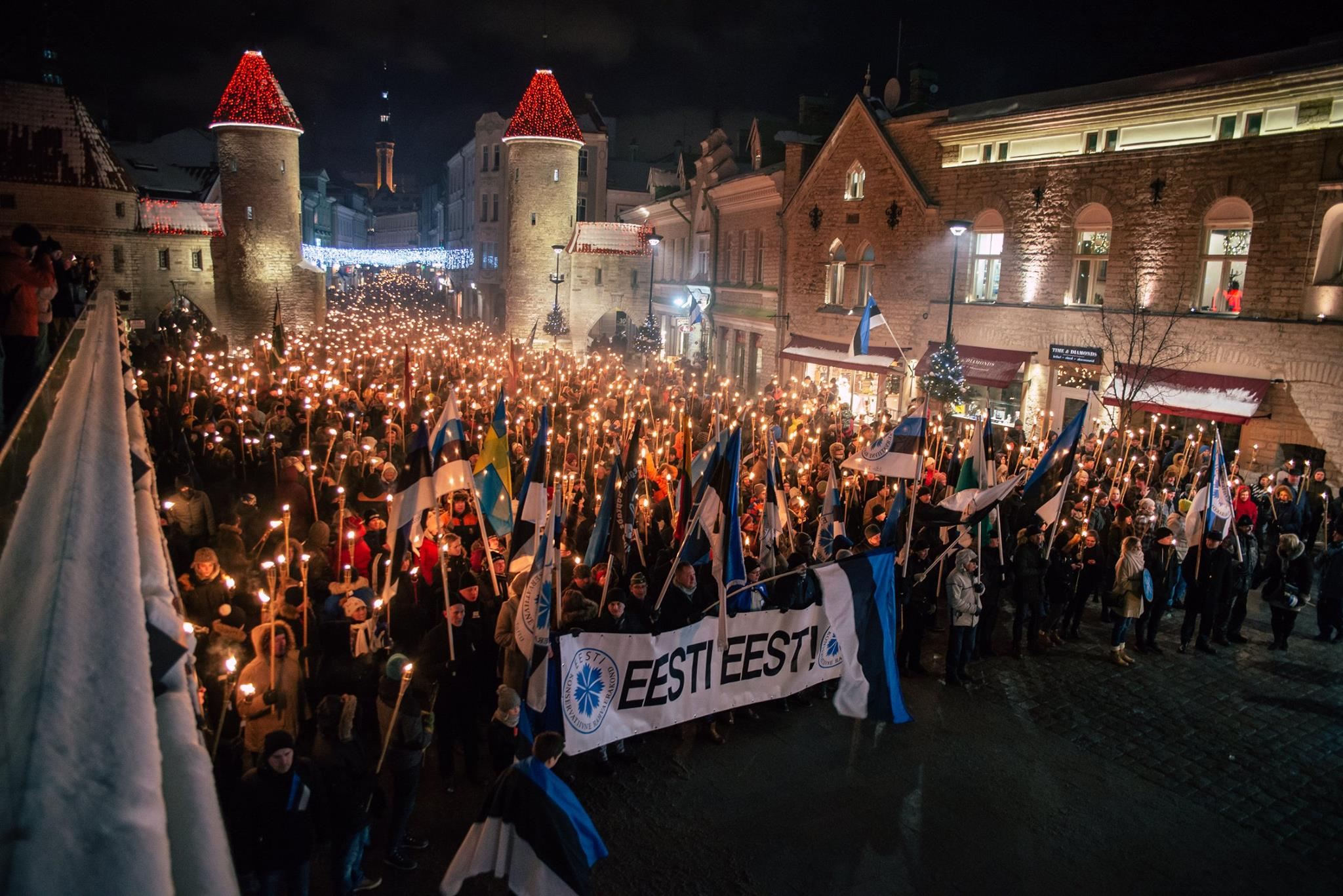
2018

== See also ==
- Candlelight vigil
