= Salcito =

- Comune
- Comune di Salcito
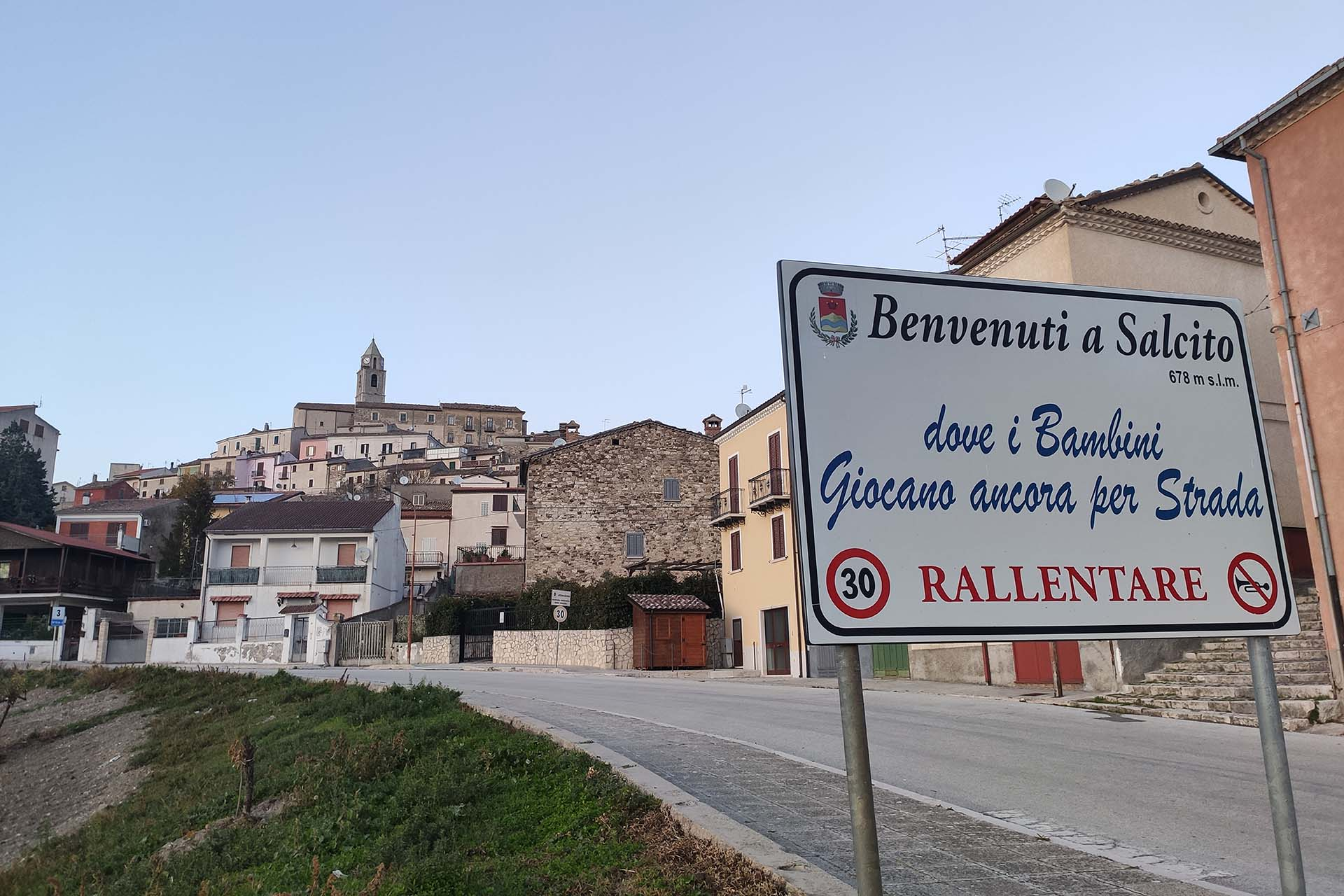
- Welcome to Salcito sign

- Location within Italy Location within Molise
- Coordinates: 41°45′N 14°31′E
- Country: Italy
- Region: Molise
- Province: Campobasso (CB)

Government
  - Mayor: Giovanni Galli

Area
  - Total: 28.26 km^{2} (10.91 sq mi)
- Elevation: 678 m (2,224 ft)

Population (30 November 2017)
  - Total: 667
  - Density: 23.6/km^{2} (61.1/sq mi)
- Demonym: Salcitani
- Time zone: UTC+1 (CET)
  - Summer (DST): UTC+2 (CEST)
- Postal code: 86026
- Dialing code: 0874
- Patron saint: St. Basilius Magnus
- Saint day: 14 June
- Website: Official website

Salcito is a comune (municipality) in the Province of Campobasso in the Italian region Molise, located about 25 kilometres (16 mi) northwest of Campobasso.

Salcito borders the following municipalities: Bagnoli del Trigno, Civitanova del Sannio, Fossalto, Pietracupa, Poggio Sannita, San Biase, Sant'Angelo Limosano, Schiavi di Abruzzo, Trivento.
