= Paolo Nicola Giampaolo =

Italian cleric and agronomist

Paolo Nicola Giampaolo (11 September 1757 – 16 January 1832) was an Italian cleric and agronomist.

== Biography ==
He was born to a poor family from Ripalimosani. He initially studied in the seminaries of Larino and Boiano. By the age of 30 years, he was teaching philosophy and mathematics for the Montecassino Abbey, when the Bishop Rossetti named him Penitenziere and teacher of the Cathedral of Boiano. In 1828, he published Dialoghi sulla religione.

His first publication was a Lezioni di Metafisica (or Metaphysical Lessons, 1803); which blended dogmatic theologic beliefs with natural philosophy. In 1807, then king Joseph Buonaparte had Paolo named Consigliere di Stato and finance minister. He was also subsequently awarded the honor of Cavaliere dell'ordine delle due Sicilie (knighthood in the Order of the Two Sicilies). In 1809, he became commissioner representing the provinces of Salerno, Avellino, and Lecce. In 1812, Inspector of the county of Molise and royal vicar of the diocese of Boiano. In 1825, he was elected a member of the Reale Accademia Borbonica.

Paolo is best known for his books on agriculture: Memoria per ristabilire l'agricoltura degli alberi nella terra di Ripalimosani (1806); Lezioni e Catechismo di agricoltura (1808); Lezioni di agricoltura (1819); and Memoria su gl'inconvenienti del sistema agrario del Regno e sui mezzi per rimedirvi (1822). These reactionary books sustain that a successful agricultural economy needs to respect both religious and royal authorities, and thus differ from the more enlightened, and thus more liberal, agronomic theories emerging from Tuscany and northern Italy. There is also a respect for incentive provided private property and the need to support the small private farmers.
