= Ripalimosani =

- Comune
- Comune di Ripalimosani
- Location within Italy Location within Molise
- Coordinates: 41°37′N 14°40′E
- Country: Italy
- Region: Molise
- Province: Campobasso (CB)
- Frazioni: Pesco Farese

Government
  - Mayor: Marco Giampaolo

Area
  - Total: 33.8 km^{2} (13.1 sq mi)
- Elevation: 640 m (2,100 ft)

Population (30 November 2017)
  - Total: 3,110
  - Density: 92.0/km^{2} (238/sq mi)
- Demonym: Ripesi
- Time zone: UTC+1 (CET)
  - Summer (DST): UTC+2 (CEST)
- Postal code: 86025
- Dialing code: 0874
- Website: Official website

Ripalimosani is a comune (municipality) in the Province of Campobasso in the Italian region Molise, located about 6 kilometres (4 mi) north of Campobasso.

Ripalimosani borders the following municipalities: Campobasso, Castropignano, Limosano, Matrice, Montagano, Oratino.

== Twin towns ==
- Borgo Tossignano, Italy

== Notable people ==
- Paolo Nicola Giampaolo (1757–1832), Italian cleric and agronomist
