= Igino Petrone =

Italian philosopher (1870–1913)

Igino Petrone (21 September 1870 – 26 July 1913) was an Italian jurist and philosopher.

He was born in the town of Limosano in the province of Campobasso. In 1891 he obtained a baccalaureate in law at the University of Naples. He obtained a scholarship that allowed him to study the philosophy of rights in Munich. He obtained in 1894, a teaching position at the University of Rome. In 1897 he was appointed professor of legal philosophy at the University of Modena. In 1900 he obtained a professorship of moral philosophy at the University of Naples. All the while, he was very active in writing about his field of interest. He was named corresponding member of the Accademia Nazionale dei Lincei

He died unexpectedly in 1913 in the town of San Giorgio a Cremano near Naples. There is a school in Campobasso named in his honor.

Works

- La fase recentissima della filosofia del diritto in Germania. Analisi critica poggiata sulla teoria della conoscenza, Pisa, E. Spoerri, 1895.
- Il valore ed i limiti di una psicogenesi della morale, Rome, published by G. Balbi, 1896.
- I limiti del determinismo scientifico. Saggio del dott. Igino Petrone, Modena, G. T. Vincenzi and sons 1900. Nuova ed. Urbino, 2000. ISBN 88-392-0435-0.
- F. Nietzsche e L. Tolstoi: idee morali del tempo. Lecture before the Società "Pro Cultura", Naples, L. Pierro, 1902.
- Lo stato mercantile chiuso di Fichte (JG Fichte?) e la premessa teorica del comunismo giuridico, Naples, A. Tessitore & Figlio, 1904.
- Problemi del mondo morale meditati da un idealista, Milan-Palermo-Naples, Remo Sandron Editors, 1905.
- Il diritto nel mondo dello spirito. Saggio filosofico, Milan, Libreria Editrice Milanese, 1910.
- A proposito della guerra nostra, Naples, R. Ricciardi, 1912.
- Etica, edited and with preface by Guido Mancini, Palermo, Remo Sandron Editore, 1918.
- Ascetica, edited by Guido Mancini, Palermo, Remo Sandron editore, 1918.
