= Annibale Ciarniello =

Annibale Ciarniello (9 January 1900 in Bagnoli del Trigno, Province of Isernia – 3 January 2007) was one of the last surviving veterans of the first World War at the time of his death, as well as the oldest medical doctor in Italy and one of the oldest people in the country.

Annibale was in the Italian Army's class of 1900, which were soldiers born in 1900 that enlisted in 1918 and were in non-combat rolls during the war in 1918. They were scheduled to be deployed into combat for the possible spring offensive in 1919, which never came, because the war ended when the armistice was signed on 11 November 1918.

In 1926, Ciarniello graduated from medical school at the University of Naples where he studied for a degree in Medicine and Surgery. He was still a practicing doctor for his close family members until the last year of his life, because he felt such great satisfaction and pride from his work.

He was married in 1939, fathered four sons and was a practicing doctor in the small town of Sant'Agapito until twenty years before his death, when he moved to the town of Bagnoli del Trigno, which was the same town he was born in.

Ciarniello thought that eating well kept a good balance between mind and body, and that it was a requirement for a long life. He talked fondly of his memories of when he was a student in Naples as a young man, and he was proud to have seen the region of Molise and province of Isernia grow and develop over the century.

He died in his home town of Bagnoli del Trigno at age 106 years, 11 months, and was remembered as a grandfather of the region of Molise and for having been one of the most well known doctors in the rural province of Isernia where he lived and practiced medicine.

== Bibliography ==
- Annibale Ciarniello 106th birthday, La Gente D'Italia (in Italian)
- Annibale Ciarniello death notice, Yahoo Italian news (in Italian)
- Italian World War I website (in Italian)
