= Bagnoli del Trigno =

- Comune
- Comune di Bagnoli del Trigno
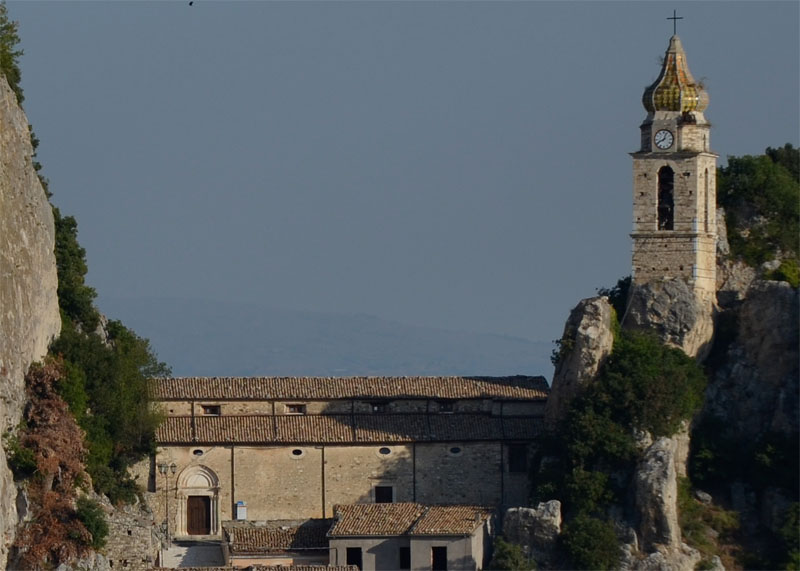
- Panorama with part of the Church of San Silvestro (Bagnoli del Trigno) on the right.

- Location within Italy Location within Molise
- Coordinates: 41°42′N 14°27′E
- Country: Italy
- Region: Molise
- Province: Isernia (IS)

Area
  - Total: 36.7 km^{2} (14.2 sq mi)
- Elevation: 660 m (2,170 ft)

Population (31 December 2017)
  - Total: 708
  - Density: 19.3/km^{2} (50.0/sq mi)
- Demonym: Bagnolesi
- Time zone: UTC+1 (CET)
  - Summer (DST): UTC+2 (CEST)
- Postal code: 86091
- Dialing code: 0874
- Patron saint: St. Vitalis of Rome
- Saint day: 20 August
- Website: Official website

Bagnoli del Trigno is a comune (municipality) in the Province of Isernia in the Italian region Molise, located about 25 kilometres (16 mi) northwest of Campobasso and about 20 kilometres (12 mi) northeast of Isernia.

Bagnoli del Trigno borders the following municipalities: Civitanova del Sannio, Duronia, Pietracupa, Salcito.

Sights include the Romanesque Church of San Silvestro (Bagnoli del Trigno), built in the 13th-14th centuries between two rock spurs.

== People ==
- Annibale Ciarniello
