= Castellino del Biferno =

- Comune
- Comune di Castellino del Biferno
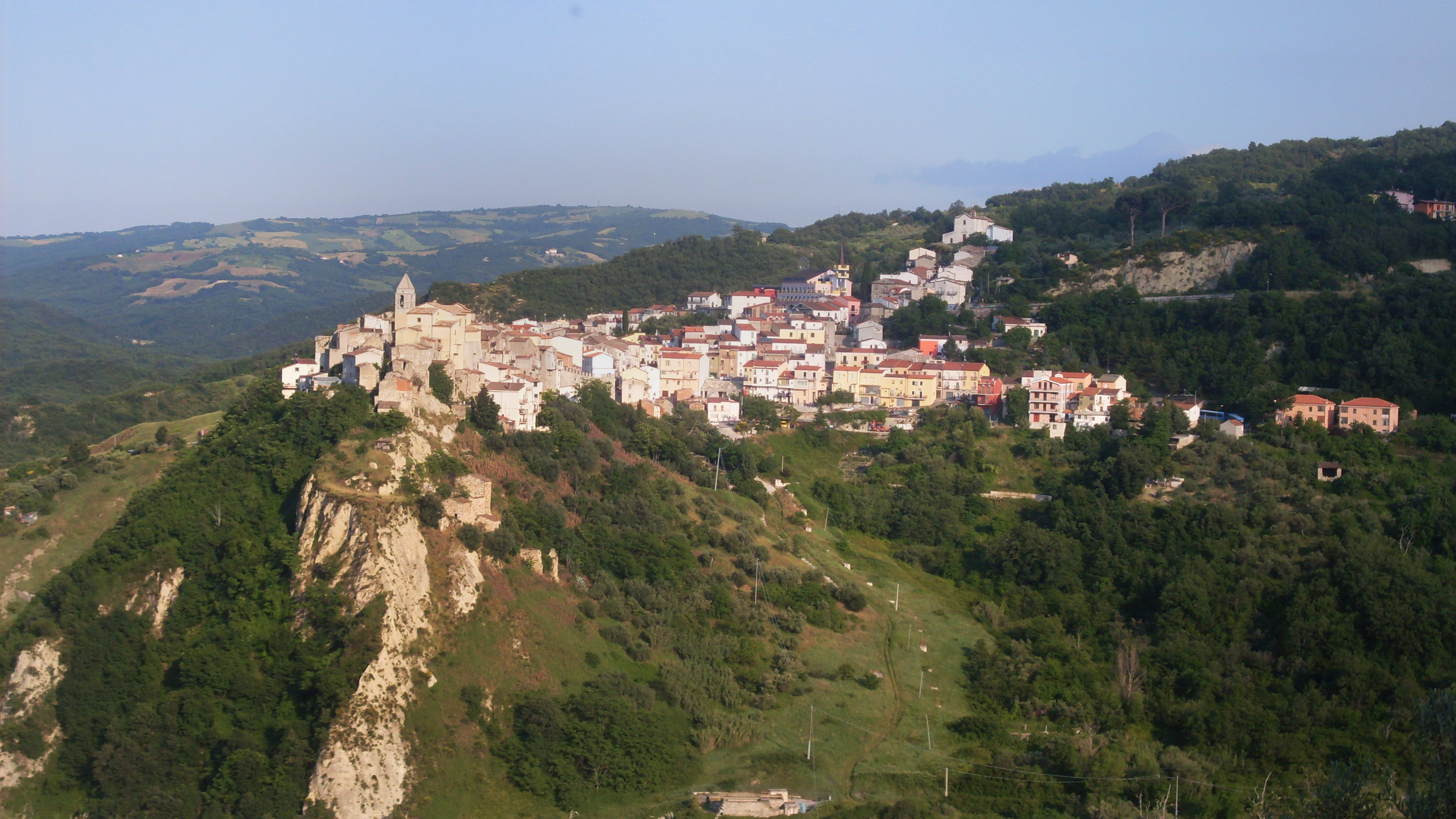
- View of Castellino del Biferno

- Location within Italy Location within Molise
- Coordinates: 41°42′N 14°44′E
- Country: Italy
- Region: Molise
- Province: Campobasso (CB)

Government
  - Mayor: Enrico Fratangelo

Area
  - Total: 15.54 km^{2} (6.00 sq mi)
- Elevation: 450 m (1,480 ft)

Population (30 November 2017)
  - Total: 557
  - Density: 35.8/km^{2} (92.8/sq mi)
- Demonym: Castellinesi
- Time zone: UTC+1 (CET)
  - Summer (DST): UTC+2 (CEST)
- Postal code: 86020
- Dialing code: 0874
- Website: Official website

Castellino del Biferno is a comune (municipality) in the Province of Campobasso in the Italian region Molise, located about 15 kilometres (9 mi) northeast of Campobasso.

Castellino del Biferno borders the following municipalities: Campolieto, Lucito, Matrice, Morrone del Sannio, Petrella Tifernina.
