= Almerindo Portfolio =

- Born: 23 May 1878; Schiavi di Abruzzo, Italy
- Died: 23 January 1966 (aged 87); Gabriels, New York, USA
- Occupations: Businessman, New York City Treasurer
- Children: 2 daughters

Almerindo Portfolio (23 May 1878 – 23 January 1966) was an Italian-born American banker and financier. He was treasurer of New York City under Mayor Fiorello La Guardia. He was an immigrant from Schiavi di Abruzzo, Italy in 1888. In 1908 he legally changed his name from Almerindo Porfilio.

Portfolio rose from a $2-a-week messenger to the presidency of the Bank of Sicily in New York and the head of a cloak & suit company, that in 1924 he gifted to six employees. He also worked as a newspaper publisher, commodity trader, and investment banker.

Between 1917 and 1919 he paid 300,000 Lira ($2 million in 2025 US dollars) to install the first electric service in his home town of Schiavi di Abruzzo, Italy. He later gave 50,000 Lira ($370,000 in 2025 US dollars) for the town's water utilities.

In 1940 Portfolio was a delegate to the Republican National Convention. In 1945 he was a member of a joint committee of influential Italian Americans promoting Allied status for Italy in World War II.

Portfolio died on January 25, 1966, at the age of 88, in Gabriels, in upstate New York, at a tuberculosis cure facility.

Portfolio’s brother in law and biographer was diplomat Paolo Alberto Rossi.

== See also ==
- List of Italian Americans
