= Limosano =

- Comune
- Comune di Limosano
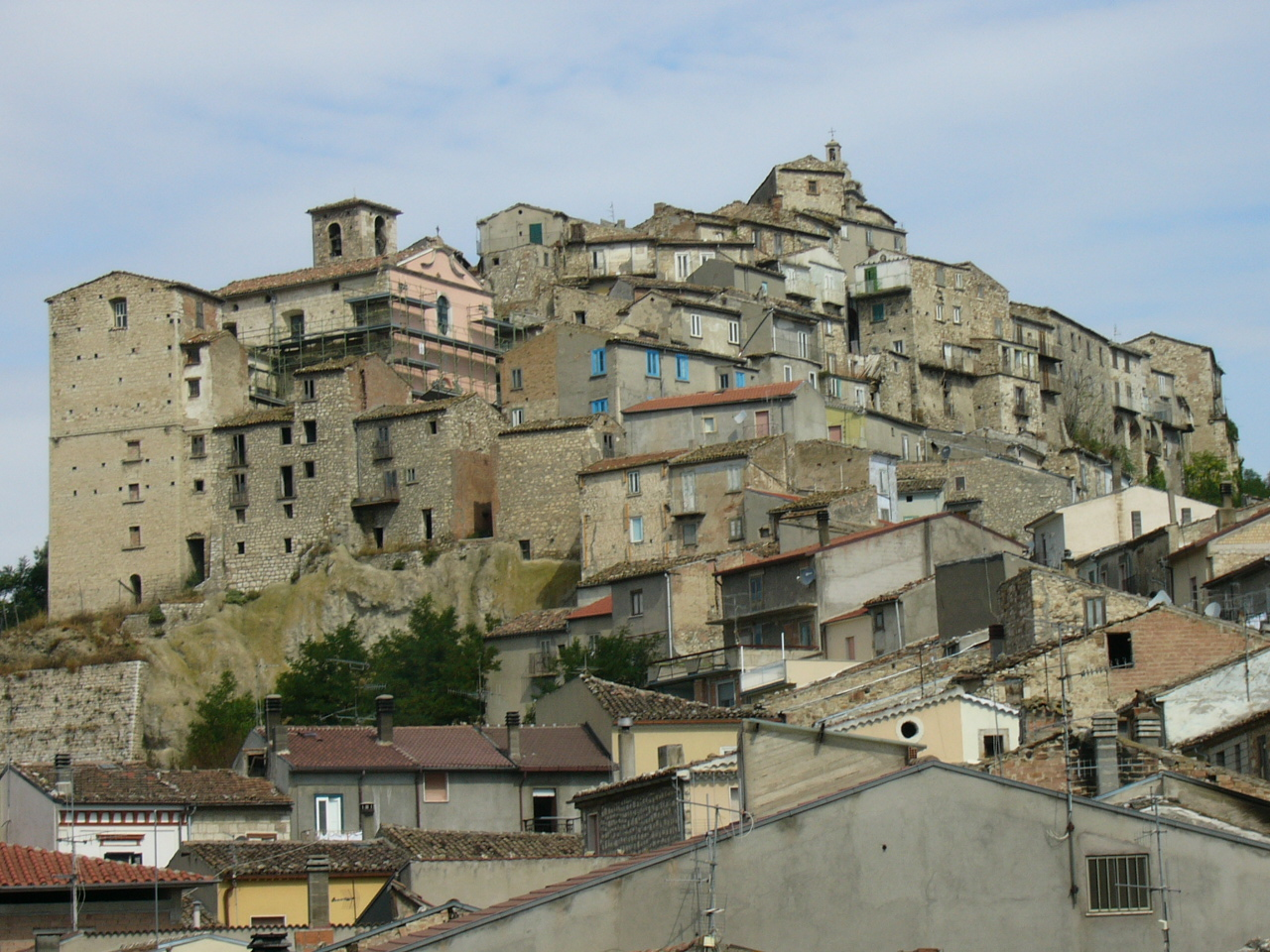
- View of Limosano

- Location within Italy Location within Molise
- Coordinates: 41°41′N 14°37′E
- Country: Italy
- Region: Molise
- Province: Campobasso (CB)

Government
  - Mayor: Angela Amoroso

Area
  - Total: 28.27 km^{2} (10.92 sq mi)
- Elevation: 687 m (2,254 ft)

Population (30 November 2017)
  - Total: 744
  - Density: 26.3/km^{2} (68.2/sq mi)
- Demonym: Limosanesi
- Time zone: UTC+1 (CET)
  - Summer (DST): UTC+2 (CEST)
- Postal code: 86022
- Dialing code: 0874
- Website: Official website

Limosano is a comune (municipality) and Latin titular see in the Province of Campobasso in the southern Italian region Molise, located about 14 kilometres (9 mi) northwest of Campobasso.

Limosano borders the following municipalities: Castropignano, Fossalto, Lucito, Montagano, Petrella Tifernina, Ripalimosani, Sant'Angelo Limosano. The village is a medieval town located on a tuff hill.

== History ==
The town originated in the early Middle Ages around a Lombard castle.

From the mid-19th century through to the mid-20th century thousands emigrated from Limosano to Canada and the United States. A large proportion of the descendants of Limosano, once counting some 3,000 inhabitants, now live in Toronto and the St. Catharines Niagara region of Ontario, Canada.

== Titular see ==
Limosano was established as a titular see of the Catholic Church on 5 February 2018.

- Titular archbishop Henryk Jagodziński (3 May 2020 – present)
