= Sant'Angelo Limosano =

- Comune
- Comune di Sant'Angelo Limosano
- Location within Italy Location within Molise
- Coordinates: 41°42′N 14°36′E
- Country: Italy
- Region: Molise
- Province: Province of Campobasso (CB)

Area
  - Total: 16.8 km^{2} (6.5 sq mi)
- Elevation: 900 m (3,000 ft)

Population (Dec. 2024)
  - Total: 301
  - Density: 17.9/km^{2} (46.4/sq mi)
- Time zone: UTC+1 (CET)
  - Summer (DST): UTC+2 (CEST)
- Postal code: 86020
- Dialing code: 0874

Sant'Angelo Limosano is a comune (municipality) in the Province of Campobasso in the Italian region Molise, located about 15 kilometres (9 mi) northwest of Campobasso. As of 31 December 2024, it had a population of 301 and an area of 16.8 square kilometres (6.5 mi^{2}).

Sant'Angelo Limosano borders the following municipalities: Fossalto, Limosano, Lucito, Salcito, San Biase, Trivento.

== Demographic evolution ==
Historical population

Year	Pop.	±%
1861	1,535	—
1871	1,583	+3.1%
1881	1,534	−3.1%
1901	1,420	−7.4%
1911	1,407	−0.9%

Year	Pop.	±%
1921	1,324	−5.9%
1931	1,179	−11.0%
1936	1,280	+8.6%
1951	1,321	+3.2%
1961	975	−26.2%

Year	Pop.	±%
1971	694	−28.8%
1981	570	−17.9%
1991	484	−15.1%
2001	397	−18.0%

Source: Data from ISTAT

== See also ==
- Molise Croats
