= Montagano =

- Comune
- Comune di Montagano
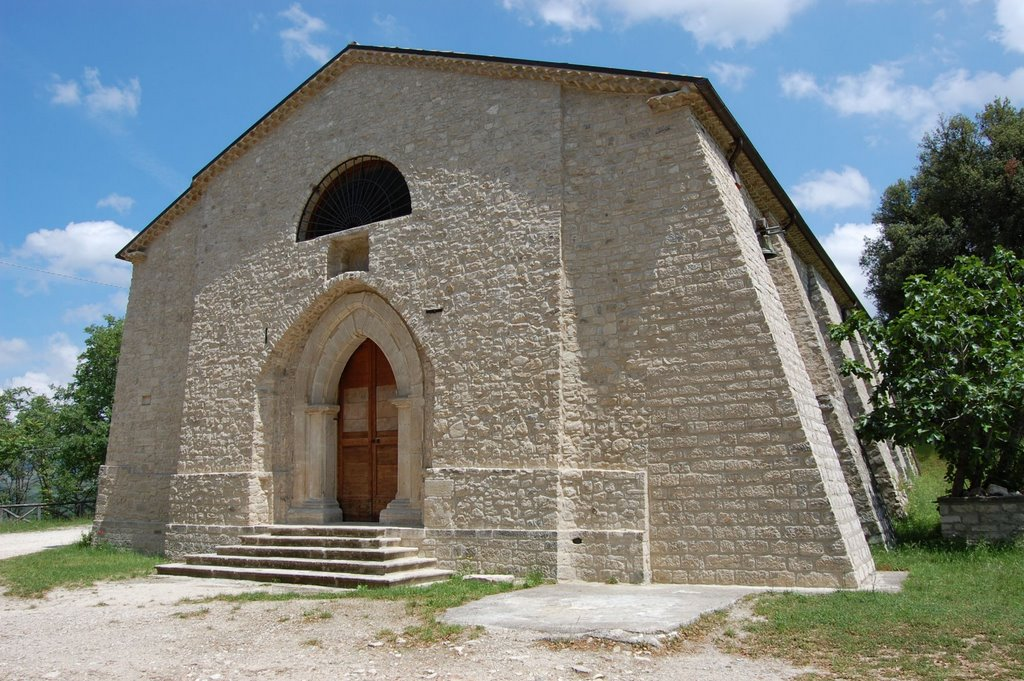
- Abbey of Santa Maria di Faifoli.

- Location within Italy Location within Molise
- Coordinates: 41°39′N 14°40′E
- Country: Italy
- Region: Molise
- Province: Campobasso (CB)

Government
  - Mayor: Giuseppantonio Mariano

Area
  - Total: 26.5 km^{2} (10.2 sq mi)
- Elevation: 803 m (2,635 ft)

Population (31 May 2016)
  - Total: 1,082
  - Density: 40.8/km^{2} (106/sq mi)
- Demonym: Montaganesi
- Time zone: UTC+1 (CET)
  - Summer (DST): UTC+2 (CEST)
- Postal code: 86023
- Dialing code: 0874
- Patron saint: Sant' Alessandro
- Website: Official website

Montagano is a comune (municipality) in the Province of Campobasso in the Italian region Molise, located about 9 kilometres (6 mi) north of Campobasso. Montagano rises on one side of the Biferno river, where once stood an ancient Samnite town where inhabitants in the 4th century B.C. sided with Hannibal against Rome.

Montagano is a white stone village surrounded by farmland that borders the following municipalities: Limosano, Matrice, Petrella Tifernina, Ripalimosani.
