= Petrella Tifernina =

- Comune
- Comune di Petrella Tifernina
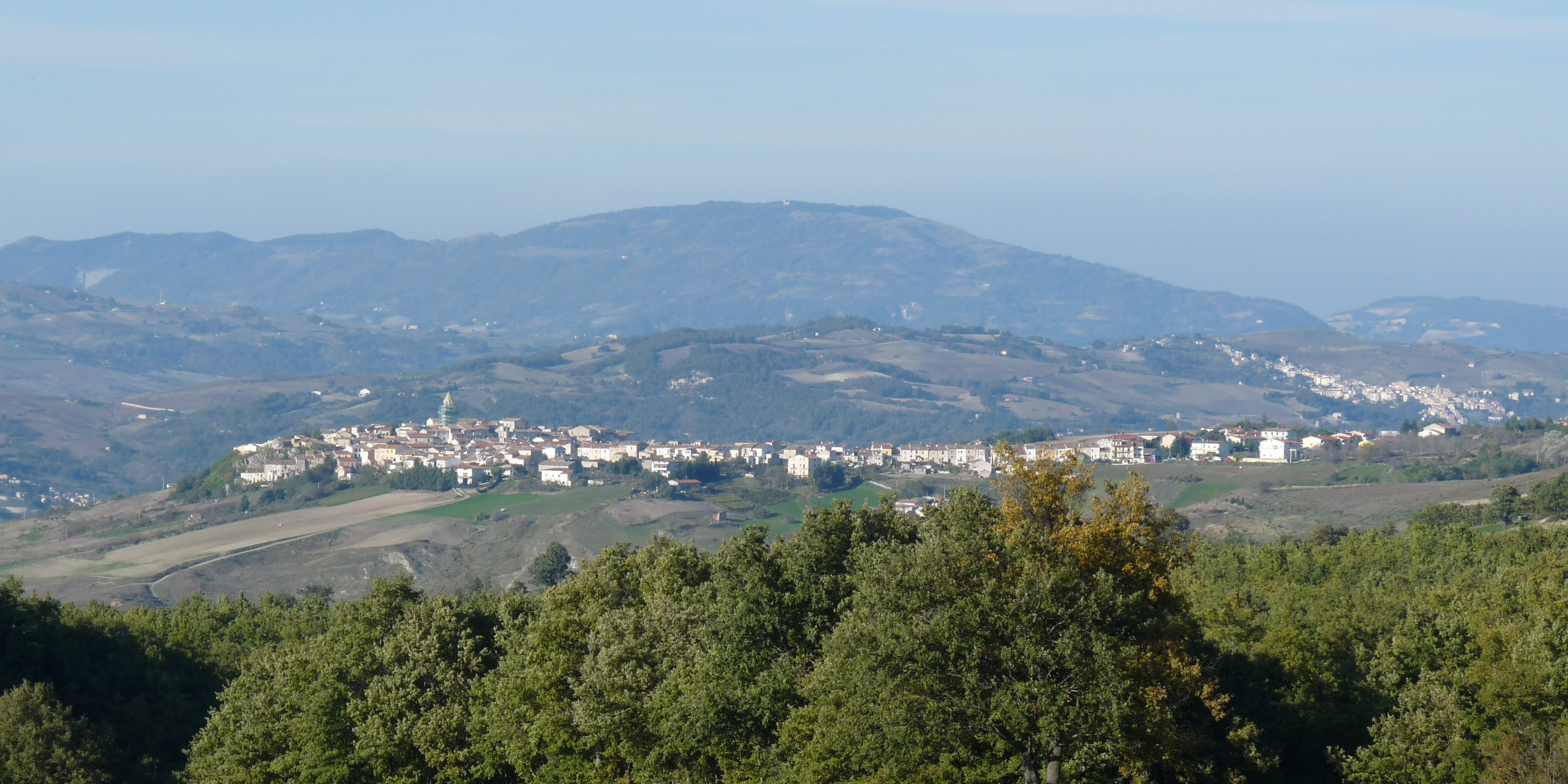
- View of Petrella Tifernina

- Location within Italy Location within Molise
- Coordinates: 41°41′N 14°42′E
- Country: Italy
- Region: Molise
- Province: Province of Campobasso (CB)

Government
  - Mayor: Domenico Marinelli

Area
  - Total: 26.52 km^{2} (10.24 sq mi)

Population (Dec. 2004)
  - Total: 1,280
  - Density: 48.3/km^{2} (125/sq mi)
- Time zone: UTC+1 (CET)
  - Summer (DST): UTC+2 (CEST)
- Postal code: 86024
- Dialing code: 0874
- Patron saint: San Giorgio

Petrella Tifernina is a comune (municipality) in the Province of Campobasso in the Italian region Molise, located about 13 kilometres (8 mi) north of Campobasso. As of 31 December 2004, it had a population of 1,280 and an area of 26.4 square kilometres (10.2 mi^{2}).

Petrella Tifernina borders the following municipalities: Castellino del Biferno, Limosano, Lucito, Matrice, Montagano.

== Demographic evolution ==
Historical population

Year	Pop.	±%
1861	2,746	—
1871	2,851	+3.8%
1881	2,866	+0.5%
1901	3,012	+5.1%
1911	2,828	−6.1%

Year	Pop.	±%
1921	2,803	−0.9%
1931	2,963	+5.7%
1936	3,116	+5.2%
1951	3,024	−3.0%
1961	2,433	−19.5%

Year	Pop.	±%
1971	1,620	−33.4%
1981	1,578	−2.6%
1991	1,464	−7.2%
2001	1,305	−10.9%

Source: Data from ISTAT

== Campo Sportivo ==
The "Campo Sportivo" is located at the base of this village. It has a parking lot, a bar/convenience store, as well as a sports complex. It has generally replaced the village's piazza as the main gathering place for its residents.

== Emigration ==
Since the end of World War II until the 1970s, the town's population declined considerable due to emigration. The places of choice for these emigrants were the Canadian cities of Montreal and Toronto.

== People ==
- Giovanni Di Stefano was born in Petrella in 1955.
- Petrella is also a surname within the United States.
- Adelaide builder and winemaker Mario Di Stefano is from Petrella.
