= Lucito =

- Comune
- Comune di Lucito
- Location within Italy Location within Molise
- Coordinates: 41°44′N 14°41′E
- Country: Italy
- Region: Molise
- Province: Campobasso (CB)

Government
  - Mayor: Fabiola De Marinis

Area
  - Total: 31.56 km^{2} (12.19 sq mi)
- Elevation: 480 m (1,570 ft)

Population (30 November 2017)
  - Total: 667
  - Density: 21.1/km^{2} (54.7/sq mi)
- Demonym: Lucitesi
- Time zone: UTC+1 (CET)
  - Summer (DST): UTC+2 (CEST)
- Postal code: 86030
- Dialing code: 0874
- Website: www.comune.lucito.cb.it

Lucito is a comune (municipality) in the Province of Campobasso in the Italian region Molise, located about 20 kilometres (12 mi) north of Campobasso.

Lucito borders the following municipalities: Castelbottaccio, Castellino del Biferno, Civitacampomarano, Limosano, Morrone del Sannio, Petrella Tifernina, Sant'Angelo Limosano, Trivento.
