= Paolo Alberto Rossi =

Italian diplomat (1887–1969)

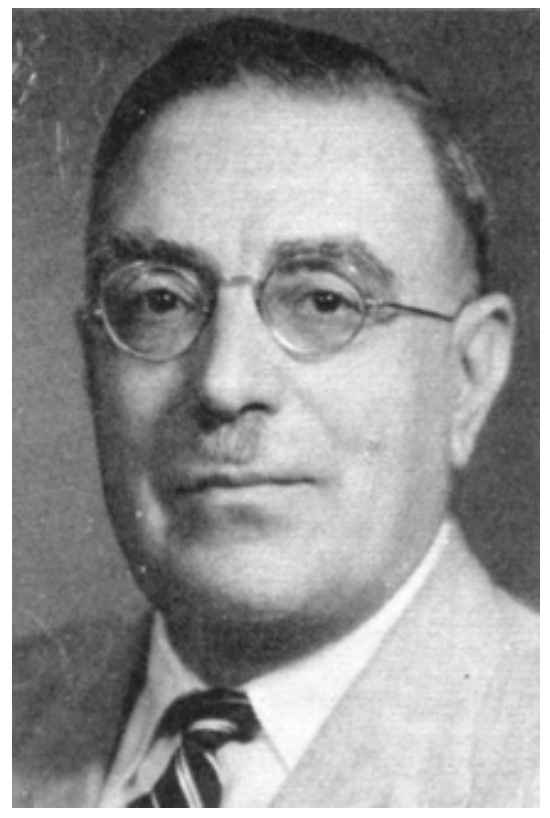
- Born: October 28, 1887; Rome
- Died: November 2, 1969 (aged 82); Rome
- Education: University of Rome
- Occupation: Diplomat
- Spouse: Giacinta Porfilio
- Children: 3
- Relatives: Almerindo Portfolio, Laurenus Clark Seelye

Paolo Alberto Rossi (28 October 1887 - 2 November 1969) was an Italian diplomat who experienced the fall of Shanghai during the communist Shanghai Campaign and authored The Communist Conquest of Shanghai: A Warning to the West.

== Early life ==
Rossi was born in Rome in 1887. His father, Egisto, was a Tuscan scholar of Sanskrit and his mother was American, whose uncle was Laurenus Clark Seelye, the first president of Smith College. After high school graduation in Mount Vernon, New York, in 1912 Rossi received a law degree from the University of Rome.

== Career ==
Rossi served in the Italian Army as an infantry officer in World War I. He was wounded in the Karst region in southwestern Slovenia. After a brief legal practice in Rome, in 1920 he was nominated and assigned to serve as Italian Vice Consul of New York and then Italian Consul General of Pittsburgh and New Orleans. In the 1930s Rossi served in the Italian Ministry of Foreign Affairs in Rome and the consulates of Aleppo, Smirne and Sarajevo. In 1947 he reopened the Consulate General's office in Marseille.

== Service in Shanghai ==
Between 1948 and 1952 Rossi was the Plenipotentiary Minister of the Italian Consulate of Shanghai. He witnessed the fall of Shanghai by the communists led by Mao Tse-tung. In 1970, Rossi published a book about it: “The Communist Conquest of Shanghai;: A Warning to the West”.

In Shanghai, Rossi was known to be a "very cultured man, that spoke english splendidly". He participated in the Foreign Correspondents' Club of China, hosted at the Broadway Mansions Hotel.

At the conclusion of his diplomatic career, Rossi opened a law practice in New York to serve Italian immigrants.

== Personal life ==
Rossi married Giacinta Porfilio, sister of Italian American entrepreneur Almerindo Portfolio and had three sons. Rossi wrote a biography in Italian about his brother in law, titled La Vita di Almerindo Portfolio, (1966).
