= Trivento =

- Comune
- Comune di Trivento
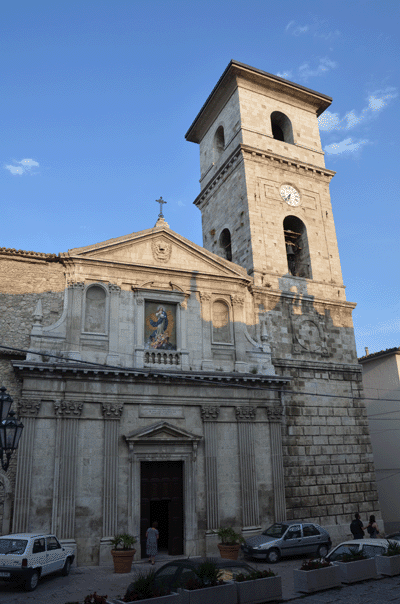
- Cathedral of Trivento

- Location within Italy Location within Molise
- Coordinates: 41°46′N 14°33′E
- Country: Italy
- Region: Molise
- Province: Campobasso (CB)

Government
  - Mayor: Domenico Santorelli

Area
  - Total: 73 km^{2} (28 sq mi)
- Elevation: 599 m (1,965 ft)

Population (31 December 2017)
  - Total: 4,663
  - Density: 64/km^{2} (170/sq mi)
- Demonym: Triventini
- Time zone: UTC+1 (CET)
  - Summer (DST): UTC+2 (CEST)
- Postal code: 86029
- Dialing code: 0874
- Website: Official website

Trivento is a comune (municipality) and Catholic episcopal see in the Province of Campobasso in the southern Italian region Molise, located about 25 kilometres (16 mi) northwest of Campobasso.

Trivento borders the following municipalities: Castelguidone, Castelmauro, Civitacampomarano, Lucito, Roccavivara, Salcito, San Biase, Sant'Angelo Limosano and Schiavi di Abruzzo.

Its church of Ss. Nazario, Celso e Vittore, dedicated to St. Nazarius, St. Celsus and St. Victor, is the cathedral episcopal see of the Roman Catholic Diocese of Trivento.
