= Duronia =

- Comune
- Comune di Duronia
- Location within Italy Location within Molise
- Coordinates: 41°40′N 14°28′E
- Country: Italy
- Region: Molise
- Province: Province of Campobasso (CB)

Area
  - Total: 22.2 km^{2} (8.6 sq mi)

Population (Dec. 2004)
  - Total: 473
  - Density: 21.3/km^{2} (55.2/sq mi)
- Time zone: UTC+1 (CET)
  - Summer (DST): UTC+2 (CEST)
- Postal code: 86020
- Dialing code: 0874

Duronia is a comune (municipality) in the Province of Campobasso in the Italian region Molise, located about 20 kilometres (12 mi) northwest of Campobasso. As of 31 December 2004, it had a population of 473 and an area of 22.2 square kilometres (8.6 mi^{2}).

Duronia borders the following municipalities: Bagnoli del Trigno, Civitanova del Sannio, Frosolone, Molise, Pietracupa, Torella del Sannio.

== Demographic evolution ==
Historical population

Year	Pop.	±%
1861	1,977	—
1871	2,131	+7.8%
1881	2,299	+7.9%
1901	2,290	−0.4%
1911	2,549	+11.3%

Year	Pop.	±%
1921	2,081	−18.4%
1931	2,281	+9.6%
1936	2,426	+6.4%
1951	2,255	−7.0%
1961	1,423	−36.9%

Year	Pop.	±%
1971	880	−38.2%
1981	709	−19.4%
1991	604	−14.8%
2001	507	−16.1%

Source: Data from ISTAT
