= Pietracupa =

- Comune
- Comune di Pietracupa
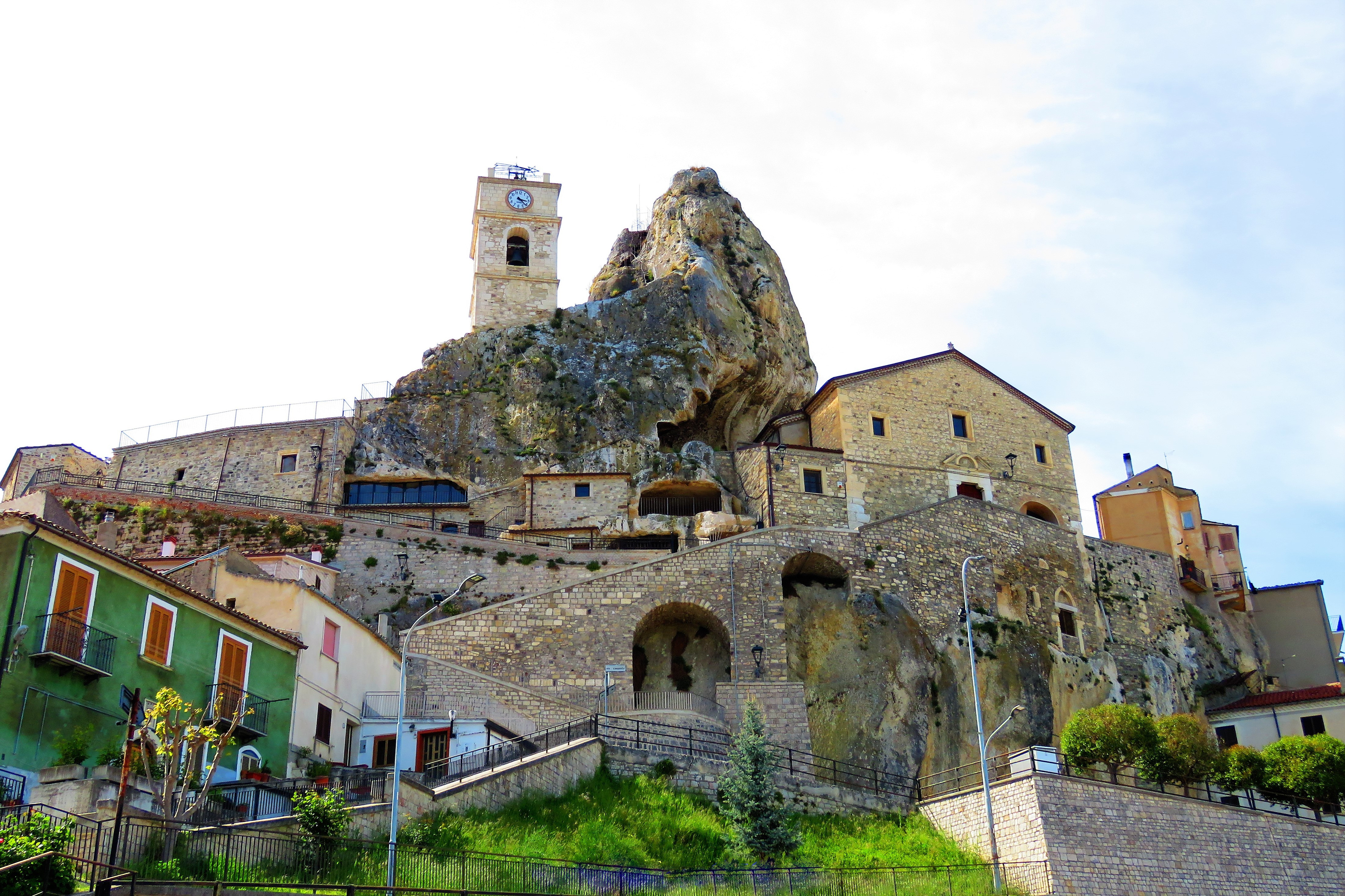
- Pietracupa and Sant'Antonio Abate church

- Location within Italy Location within Molise
- Coordinates: 41°41′N 14°31′E
- Country: Italy
- Region: Molise
- Province: Campobasso (CB)

Government
  - Mayor: Camillo Santilli

Area
  - Total: 10.0 km^{2} (3.9 sq mi)
- Elevation: 695 m (2,280 ft)

Population (30 November 2017)
  - Total: 208
  - Density: 20.8/km^{2} (53.9/sq mi)
- Demonym: Pietracupesi
- Time zone: UTC+1 (CET)
  - Summer (DST): UTC+2 (CEST)
- Postal code: 86020
- Dialing code: 0874
- Patron saint: St. Gregory the Great
- Saint day: 19 August
- Website: Official website

Pietracupa is a comune (municipality) in the Province of Campobasso in the Italian region Molise, located about 20 kilometres (12 mi) northwest of Campobasso.

Pietracupa borders the following municipalities: Bagnoli del Trigno, Duronia, Fossalto, Salcito, Torella del Sannio.
