= Schiavi di Abruzzo =

Schiavi
- Comune
- Comune di Schiavi di Abruzzo
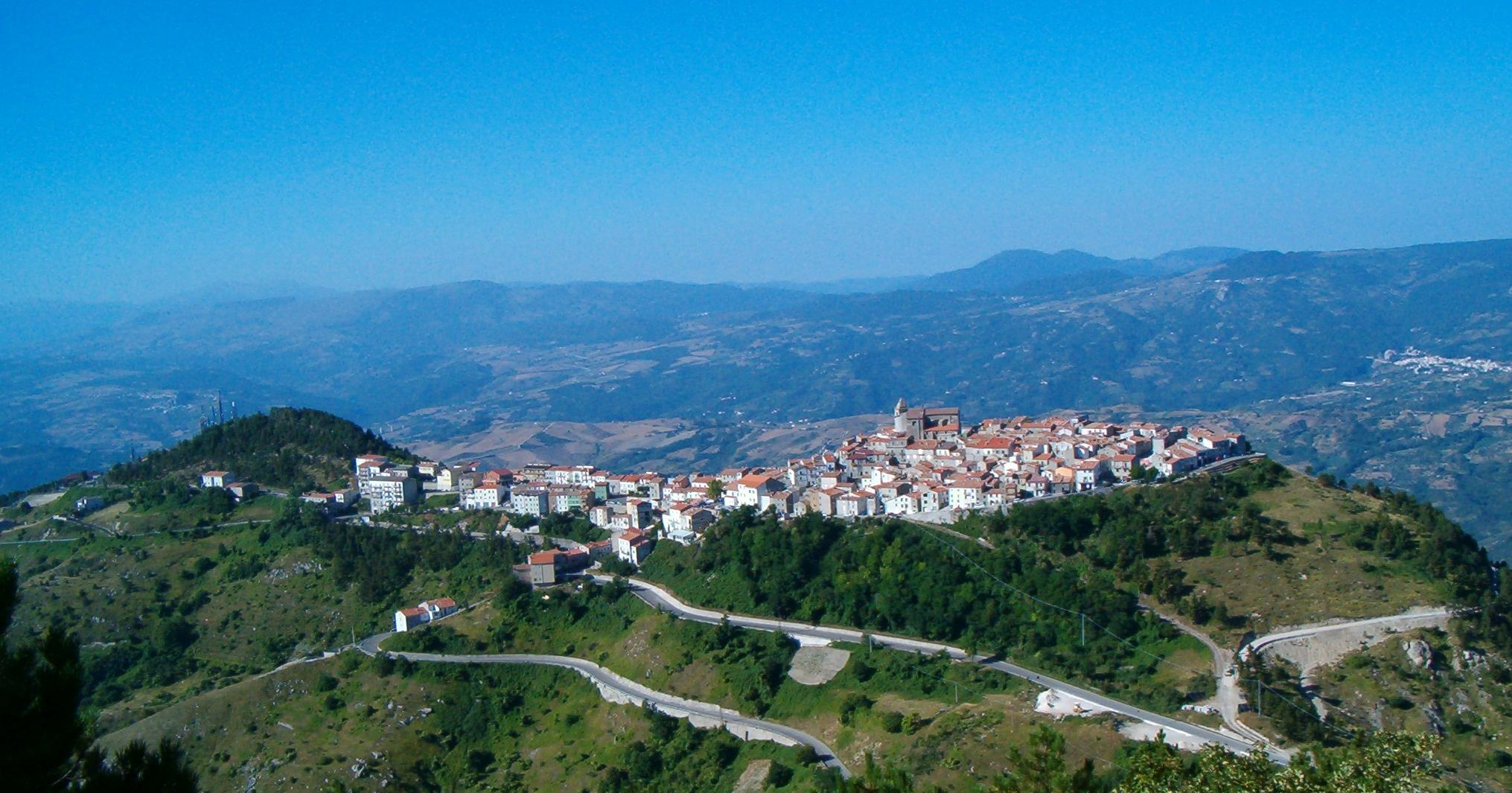

- Location within Italy Location within Abruzzo
- Coordinates: 41°49′N 14°29′E
- Country: Italy
- Region: Abruzzo
- Province: Chieti (CH)
- Frazioni: Badia, Canali di Taverna, Cannavina, Casali, Cupello, Salce, San Martino, San Martino Superiore, Taverna, Valli, Valloni

Government
  - Mayor: Luciano Piluso

Area
  - Total: 45.58 km^{2} (17.60 sq mi)
- Elevation: 1,172 m (3,845 ft)

Population (31 December 2021)
  - Total: 676
  - Density: 14.8/km^{2} (38.4/sq mi)
- Demonym: Schiavesi
- Time zone: UTC+1 (CET)
  - Summer (DST): UTC+2 (CEST)
- Postal code: 66045
- Dialing code: 0873
- Patron saint: Saint Maurice
- Saint day: September 22
- Website: Official website

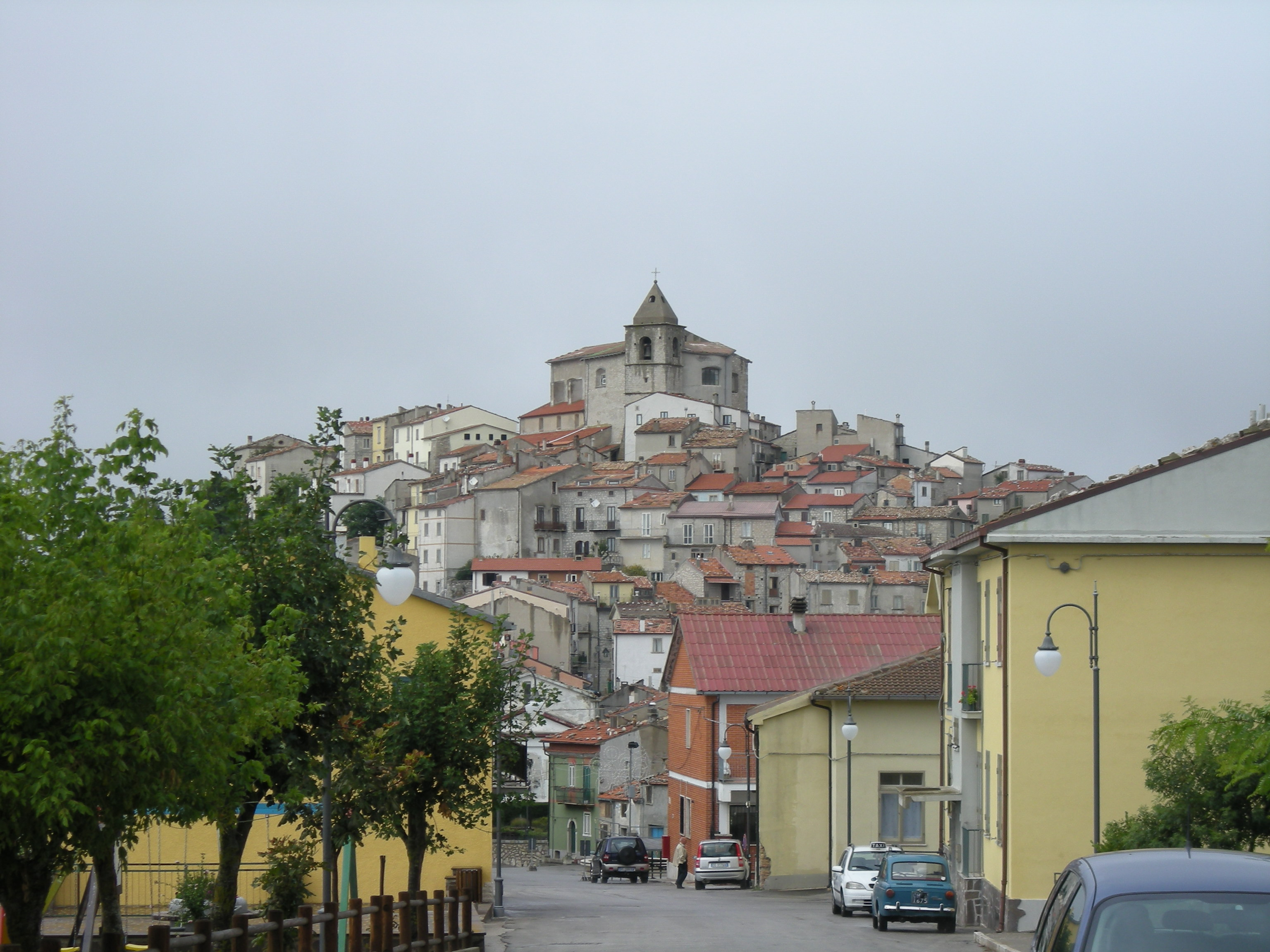
View from "La Rotonda".

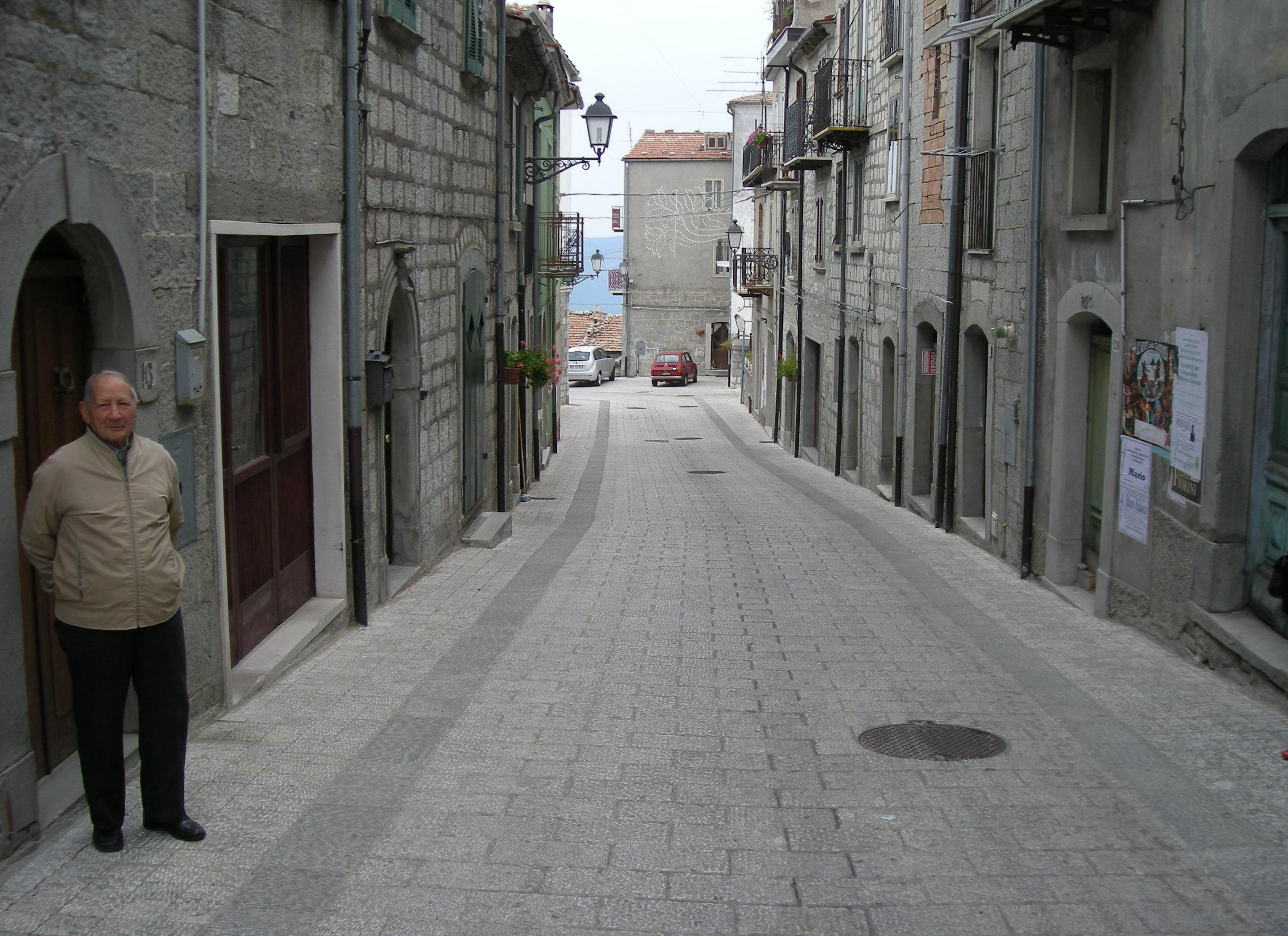
Via Umberto I, one of the main streets.

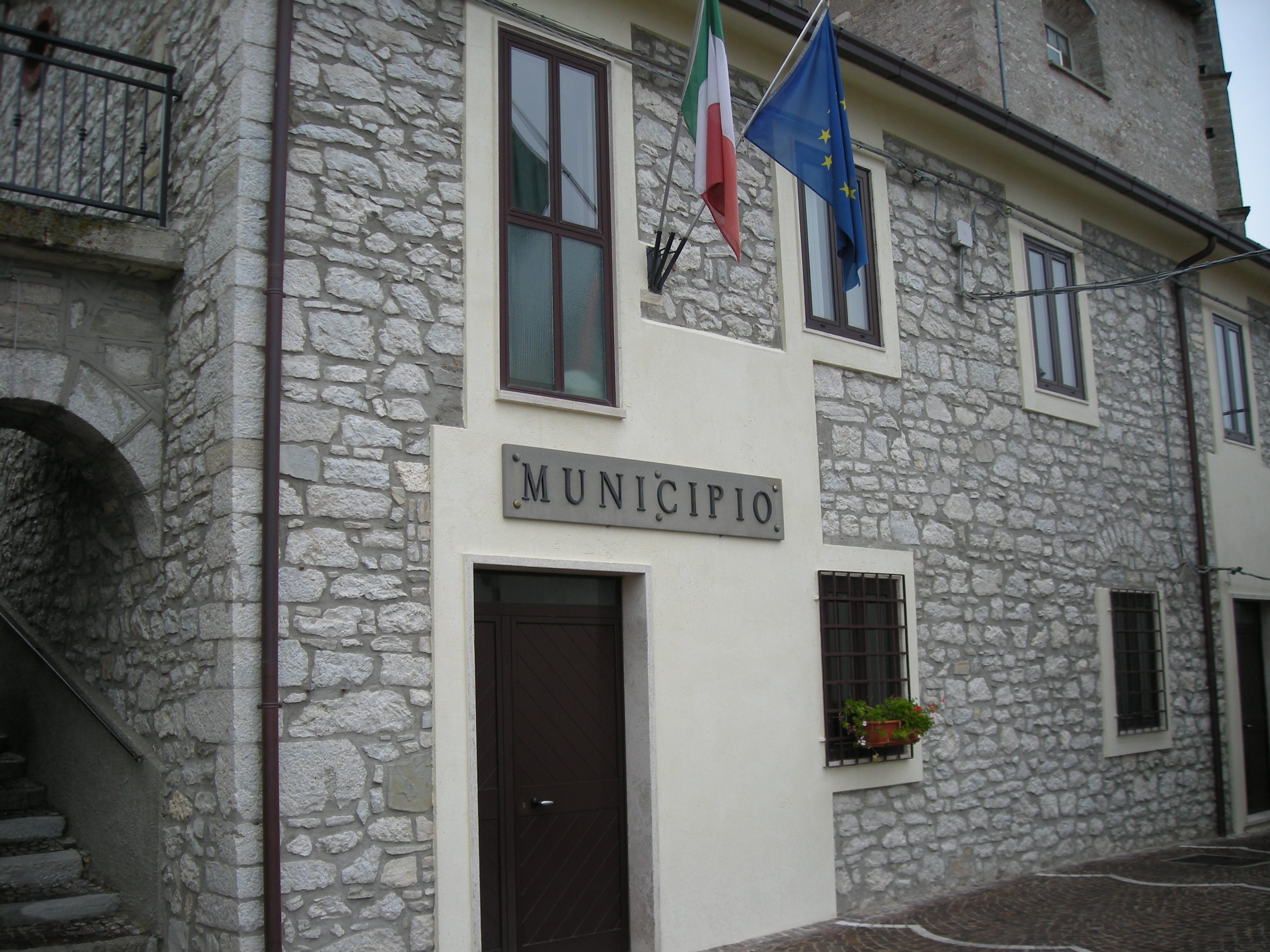
Town hall.

Schiavi di Abruzzo is a hill town in the province of Chieti, Abruzzo, central Italy. It is located in the Apennine Mountains, in the southernmost portion of the Abruzzo region, on border with the Molise region.

It is 56 kilometres (35 mi), from the Adriatic Sea, and 225 kilometres (140 mi) from Rome.

== Geography ==
The historical center of the town is situated at the highest point of a mountain peak, at 1,170 metres (3,840 ft), and there are population centers or administrative divisions in the valleys on three sides of the mountain. Three quarters of the population lives in these surrounding valleys.

Heavy snowfall can occur in winter months.

== Language and dialect ==
The town has a historical Italian dialect known as Schiavese. For many centuries there have been different dialects even between towns in the same vicinity. With the advent of television, the dialects have become less prevalent.

== Population ==
The population in 1861 was 3,657. As was the case of the rural areas of Southern Italy, the town experienced a mass immigration (Italian diaspora) to North and South America between 1861 and 1914. This immigration lead an abrupt decline of the agricultural economy.

Nonetheless the population peaked in 1961 at 4,526. Since then there has been a steady decline due to residents having sought employment in the Italian cities (mostly Rome), and also throughout Europe.

== History ==
The first written mention of the town dates back to Middle Ages, in the first half of the 11th century. Also, the name Schavis and Sclavi appeared in the Libro delle decime (tithe book) of 1309 and of 1328. It is commonly known that there was a colony of Slavs that became a fief of Roberto da Sclavo, from which the name of the town was probably derived.

From 1130 the town was part of the Kingdom of Sicily, and later of Kingdom of Naples.

From 1626 until 1806 the town was also a fief of the Caracciolo di SantoBuono a branch the Caracciolo clan of Naples, and administered from San Buono, a town 34 kilometres (21 mi) away.

From 1816 to 1861, Schiavi was part of the Kingdom of Two Sicilies, then becoming part of the Kingdom of Italy, until 1946 when Italy became a republic.

== People ==
- Almerindo Portfolio, treasurer of New York City
- Auro D'Alba, poet. See a poem he wrote about Schiavi.

== Main sights ==
- Templi Italici archaeological site. In the valley 200 metres (660 ft) below the town are the ruins of two temples dating from the period of Classical Antiquity, from about 3 BC. Known as the Templi Italici, referring to the Italic people of whom the Samnites, who lived here before the Roman conquest, were a subgroup.
- Purgatorio Park, including walks among pine trees.
- A replica of the Grotto of the Madonna of Lourdes is being constructed in the valley just below the town and the Italic Temples.

== Transportation ==
The best access is by car from Rome.
