= Ndocciata =

Christmas festival in Molise, Italy

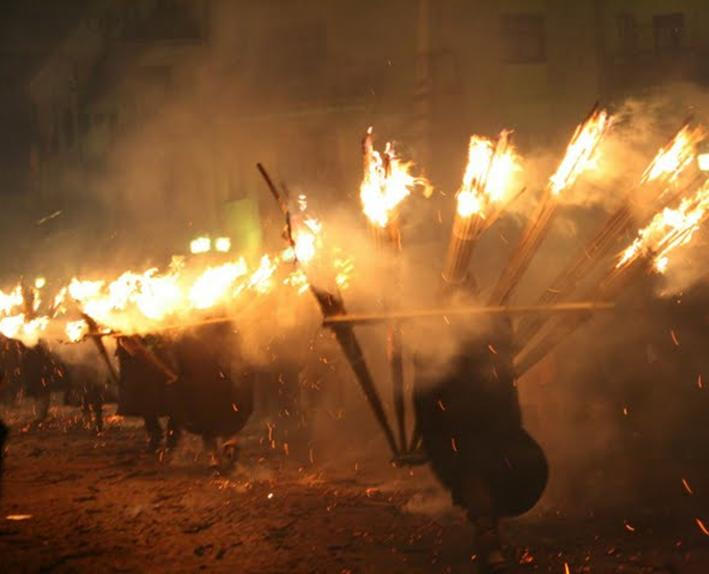
The Ndocciata torchlight parade.

Ndocciata is an ancient Christmas festival celebrated in Molise, southern Italy, specifically in the city of Agnone. On the evening of December 24 the "Ndocciata" of Agnone is a parade of a great number of "'ndocce" (torches), structures with a typical fanwise shape, made of silver fir pinewood pallets. They may be only one torch or, more often, with multiple torches up to twenty fires. Four metres high, "'ndocce" are transported by different carriers dressed in traditional costumes. The big bell of St. Anthony's Church is rung, and groups from the cities' districts (Capammonde and Capabballe, Colle Sente, Guastra, Onofrio, San Quirico) consisting of hundreds of carriers of all ages, light their ndocce (torches) to set off along the main streets which thus becomes what locals call a "river of fire". There is a choral participation and bagpipers along the roads of the village, and groups compete in order to have the biggest and the most beautiful "'ndocce". The procession ends with a bonfire called "Bonfire of Brotherhood" at Plebiscite Square where a Nativity scene is displayed.

== History ==
The roots of the festival precede the Christian and Roman eras to the time of the Samnite tribes. The Samnites were using ndocce as a source of light during the strategic tribal shifts that occurred at night. The tradition has since been passed down to farmers (noted after the 9th century) that sought to illuminate the path from the various districts that took them to reach the many churches in town on Christmas night and witness the Nativity. Different traditions have been reflected in Ndocciata over the years, for example, if the wind blew from the north during the bonfire it was expected to be a good year. During medieval times, a roaring fire from the torches helped overcome witches. Another Ndocciata tradition recalls that boys on this occasion tried to make a good impression in the eyes of the town girls they were competing for, and they tried to create the most beautiful and compact (in order to make it last longer) ndocce. At the end of the parade the ndoccia was brought under the window of the girl on which he pinned his hope. If she looked out meant that she appreciated the gesture, adversely a bucket of water extinguished the torch and the ardour of youth. The public square bonfire lighting is now meant for people meet to say goodbye to anything negative, and is symbolically burned in the fire. At the end of the parade, a Nativity is displayed symbolizing not only Christmas but renewal for a new year.

The ndocce are large torches made of silver fir pine and white bundles of dried broom held together by twine. The torches are three to four metres high and sometimes are joined by horizontal poles to form groups that can reach up to twenty torches arranged in the shape of a fan. The carriers wear black complemented with a hood or hat, which is derived from the ancient garments of the Oscan Samnite tribe as a tacit form of humility.
