= Matrice =

- Comune
- Comune di Matrice
- Location within Italy Location within Molise
- Coordinates: 41°37′N 14°43′E
- Country: Italy
- Region: Molise
- Province: Province of Campobasso (CB)

Area
  - Total: 20.4 km^{2} (7.9 sq mi)

Population (Dec. 2004)
  - Total: 1,081
  - Density: 53.0/km^{2} (137/sq mi)
- Time zone: UTC+1 (CET)
  - Summer (DST): UTC+2 (CEST)
- Postal code: 86030
- Dialing code: 0874

Matrice is a comune (municipality) in the Province of Campobasso in the Italian region Molise, located about 7 kilometres (4 mi) northeast of Campobasso. As of 31 December 2004, it had a population of 1,081 and an area of 20.4 square kilometres (7.9 mi^{2}).

Matrice borders the following municipalities: Campobasso, Campolieto, Castellino del Biferno, Montagano, Petrella Tifernina, Ripalimosani, San Giovanni in Galdo.

At the beginning of the 20th century, many residents of Matrice began to immigrate to the U.S.

== Demographic evolution ==
Historical population

Year	Pop.	±%
1861	1,808	—
1871	1,927	+6.6%
1881	1,902	−1.3%
1901	1,924	+1.2%
1911	1,862	−3.2%

Year	Pop.	±%
1921	2,123	+14.0%
1931	1,620	−23.7%
1936	1,604	−1.0%
1951	1,707	+6.4%
1961	1,404	−17.8%

Year	Pop.	±%
1971	1,096	−21.9%
1981	1,042	−4.9%
1991	1,077	+3.4%
2001	1,067	−0.9%

Source: Data from ISTAT

=== Traditions ===
Matrice's main festival is that of its patron saint, Saint Urban, celebrated on the third Sunday of May along with the Madonna della Strada, with a solemn procession from the village to the country church. The wooden statues are paraded in procession to the church entrance on ox-drawn carts.

The religious program subsequently alternates with the secular program, with dances, concerts in the town center, and tastings of typical products. The actual festival of the Madonna della Strada is celebrated on August 14th and 15th.
