= San Biase =

- Comune
- Comune di San Biase
- Location within Italy Location within Molise
- Coordinates: 41°42′55″N 14°35′30″E
- Country: Italy
- Region: Molise
- Province: Campobasso (CB)
- Frazioni: Rione Centro, Rione Valle, Rione Alto, Rione Croce

Government
  - Mayor: Isabella Di Florio

Area
  - Total: 11.85 km^{2} (4.58 sq mi)
- Elevation: 820 m (2,690 ft)

Population (2026)
  - Total: 117
  - Density: 9.87/km^{2} (25.6/sq mi)
- Demonym: Sanbiasesi
- Time zone: UTC+1 (CET)
  - Summer (DST): UTC+2 (CEST)
- Postal code: 86020
- Dialing code: 0874
- Patron saint: St. Blaise
- Saint day: 3 January
- Website: Official website

San Biase is a village and comune (municipality) in the Province of Campobasso in the region of Molise in southern Italy, located about 20 kilometres (12 mi) northwest of Campobasso. It has 117 inhabitants.

San Biase borders the municipalities Salcito, Sant'Angelo Limosano, and Trivento.

== Demographics ==
As of 2026, the population is 117, of which 51.3% are male, and 48.7% are female. Minors make up 11.1% of the population, and seniors make up 45.3%.

San Biase had a strong negative migration from 1950s to 1970s/1980s and now there are very few young people in the village, but the families of the people who migrated return to the village in Summer, especially in August.

Historical population

Year	Pop.	±%
1861	1,166	—
1871	1,179	+1.1%
1881	1,106	−6.2%
1901	1,073	−3.0%
1911	1,171	+9.1%
1921	1,102	−5.9%
1931	1,052	−4.5%
1936	1,118	+6.3%

Year	Pop.	±%
1951	1,135	+1.5%
1961	821	−27.7%
1971	626	−23.8%
1981	471	−24.8%
1991	360	−23.6%
2001	271	−24.7%
2011	209	−22.9%
2021	134	−35.9%

Source: ISTAT

=== Immigration ===
As of 2025, immigrants make up 9.7% of the population. The 5 largest foreign countries of birth are Argentina, Tunisia, Belgium, Peru, and Romania.

== Culture ==
The principal traditions are the San Biagio feast on 3 February with the playing of the Morra and the distribution of bread to all the Inhabitants, the Santa Pia feast on 14 August, the Ferragosto festivity on 15 August and the Sagra delle Sagne alla Z'Flmen on 16 August.

Formerly the four quarters (Rioni) challenged themselves in the "Palio dei Rioni" and "Palio degli Asini" (donkey race around the football pitch) games, but they are currently not organized because of economic problems.

== See also ==
- Molise Croats
