= Torella del Sannio =

- Comune
- Comune di Torella del Sannio
- Location within Italy Location within Molise
- Coordinates: 41°38′N 14°31′E
- Country: Italy
- Region: Molise
- Province: Campobasso (CB)
- Frazioni: Casalciprano, Castropignano, Duronia, Fossalto, Frosolone (IS), Molise, Pietracupa

Area
  - Total: 16 km^{2} (6.2 sq mi)
- Elevation: 837 m (2,746 ft)

Population (October 2009)
  - Total: 808
  - Density: 50/km^{2} (130/sq mi)
- Time zone: UTC+1 (CET)
  - Summer (DST): UTC+2 (CEST)
- Postal code: 86028
- Dialing code: 0874
- ISTAT code: 070079

Torella del Sannio is a town and comune in the province of Campobasso (Molise, Italy).

== History ==
The village is believed to have been founded around 800 BC and hosts a monastery, and a medieval castle-tower from the 12th century, hence the name (meaning little tower in local dialect).
