= Castropignano =

- Comune
- Comune di Castropignano
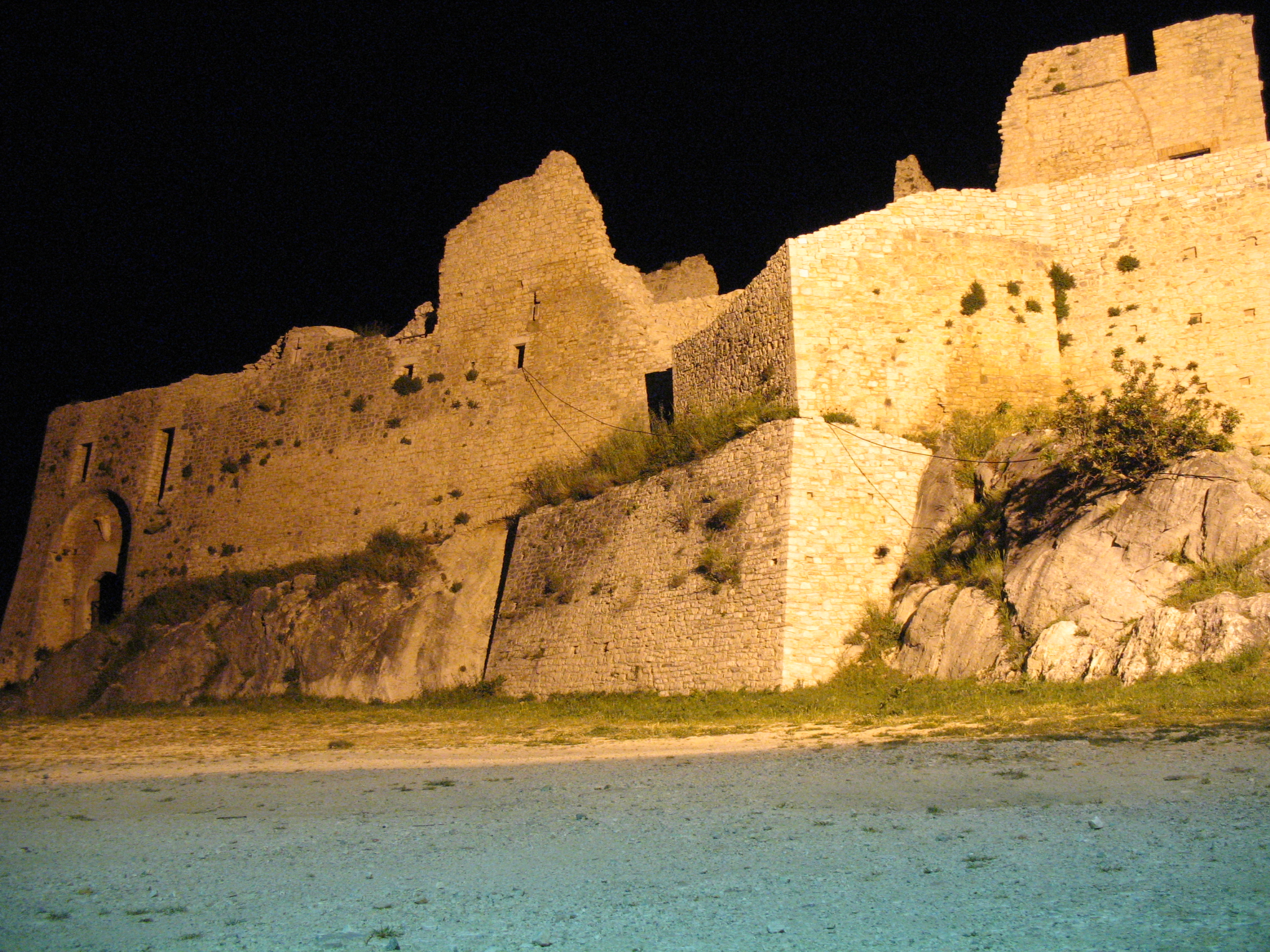
- Castello d'Evoli by night

- Coat of arms

- Location within Italy Location within Molise
- Coordinates: 41°37′N 14°34′E
- Country: Italy
- Region: Molise
- Province: Campobasso (CB)
- Frazioni: Roccaspromonte

Government
  - Mayor: Nicola Scapillati

Area
  - Total: 27.0 km^{2} (10.4 sq mi)
- Elevation: 590 m (1,940 ft)

Population (30 June 2017)
  - Total: 923
  - Density: 34.2/km^{2} (88.5/sq mi)
- Demonym: Castropignanesi
- Time zone: UTC+1 (CET)
  - Summer (DST): UTC+2 (CEST)
- Postal code: 86010
- Dialing code: 0874
- Website: Official website

Castropignano is a comune (municipality) in the Province of Campobasso in the Italian region Molise, located about 10 kilometres (6 mi) northwest of Campobasso.

It is home to a medieval castle, the Castello d'Evoli, built in the mid-fourteenth century, perhaps over the remains of a Samnite fortress.

== See also ==
- Francesco Eboli, Duke of Castropignano
