= Molise =

Region of Italy

Molise Moliš (Slavomolisano)
- Region
- Flag Coat of arms

- Location of Molise in Italy
- Coordinates: 41.6997°N 14.6111°E
- Country: Italy
- Capital: Campobasso

Government
  - Type: Presidential system
  - President: Francesco Roberti (FI)

Area
  - Total: 4,460.65 km^{2} (1,722.27 sq mi)

Population (2026)
  - Total: 285,940
  - Density: 64.103/km^{2} (166.03/sq mi)
- Demonym(s): English: Molisan; Italian: Molisano (man); Italian: Molisana (woman)

GDP
  - Total: €7.987 billion (2024)
  - Per capita: €27,829 (2024)
- Time zone: UTC+1 (CET)
  - Summer (DST): UTC+2 (CEST)
- ISO 3166 code: IT-67
- HDI (2021): 0.874 very high · 15th of 21
- NUTS Region: ITF
- Website: www.regione.molise.it

Molise (UK: /mɒˈliːzeɪ/ mol-EE-zay, US: /ˈmoʊlizeɪ, moʊˈliːzeɪ/ MOH-lee-zay, moh-LEE-zay;Italian: [moˈliːze]) is an administrative region of Italy that covers 4,460.65 km^{2} (1,722 sq mi), thus being the second smallest region in the country after Aosta Valley; it is located in southern Italy, and has a population of 285,940 as of 2026. Its regional capital and largest city is Campobasso, which is also the capital of the Province of Campobasso, one of the two provinces that make up Molise. The other one is the Province of Isernia.

The region was born in 1963 from the division with Abruzzo, with which it formed the region of Abruzzi e Molise.

== Etymology ==
The name Molise appeared for the first time during the High Middle Ages as the name of a Norman county located roughly in the territory between the comuni of Torella del Sannio and Duronia, both in Molise. The county's name came from the name of the family that governed it, the de' Moulins.

== History ==
=== Prehistory ===
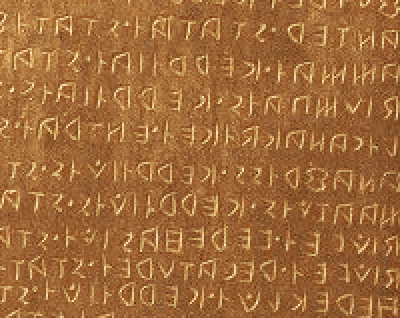
Fragment of the Oscan Tablet (III century B.C.)

Evidence found in the archeological site of Isernia La Pineta shows that Molise was inhabited as far back as the Paleolithic period. In this specific site traces of human presence dating up to 700 000 years ago were found, making Isernia La Pineta one of the most ancient and important sites in Italy and Western Europe. The fossil of a child who lived 583 000 years ago was found here, too, alongside the remains of animals and plants.

=== Pre-Roman and Roman era ===
Before the Romans arrived, Molise was part of the historical region of Samnium, and was thus inhabited by populations of samnite heritage. The tribe of the Penti settled around the 7th century BC the area that is today comprehended in the city of Isernia and the country around Campobasso, having frequent contacts with the Frentani, an Italic tribe that descended from the Samnites. Since the 4th century BC, the Roman Republic's expansionist aspiration caused the Samnites to collide with the Romans. This contact eventually sparked the Samnite Wars.

During the Second and the Third Samnite War the major cities such as Isernia and Bojano, which had been the Pentri's capital, were captured by the Romans, although the Samnites were completely defeated and their territory was effectively conquered only after Sulla won the Social War. Under Augustus Molise's territory was placed under the Regio IV Samnium.

=== Middle Ages ===
Molise's economy and demographics declined greatly during the late antiquity, and when the Lombards arrived they found the region to be not densely populated and lacking of important urban centers.

Under the Duchy of Benevento Molise was divided into gastaldates. In his Historia Langobardorum, Paul the Deacon writes that one of these gastaldates was the Gastaldate of Bojano, created around 667 AD by Grimoald I, King of the Lombards, who gave it in concession to the bulgarian commander Alzeco.

Many of the towns and villages of the region were founded under the Lombard domination, and the Lombards were also responsible in the diffusion of the cult of Saint Michael.

Between the 9th and the 11th century Molise was then ruled by the Normans. In 1045 Rudolf of Moulins descendend in southern Italy alongside the Hauteville family, conquering what then became the County of Bojano. In this period of time, the area was starrting to be called comitatus molisii probably because of the Moulins', the ruling family's, name. After the Moulins lost power around the end of the 11th century, the County organically dismantled in smaller fiefs.

After the reforms made by Frederick II, the Contado di Molise became the seat of a justiciarate of which the administration was conjoined with that of the Terra di Lavoro, forming a single administrative district: the Justitiaratus Molisii et Terra Laboris.

=== Modern era ===
In 1538 Molise was separated from the Terra di Lavoro and integrated within the Capitanata, until in 1806 Joseph Bonaparte extended the French administrative model, based on provinces, to the Kingdom of Naples. In 1811, the borders of the provinces had been practically totally defined, and the Province of Molise's territory reached roughly the area that it has today.

From 1817 the Province went through a crisis because of the presence on the territory of phenomena of brigandage.

== Geography ==
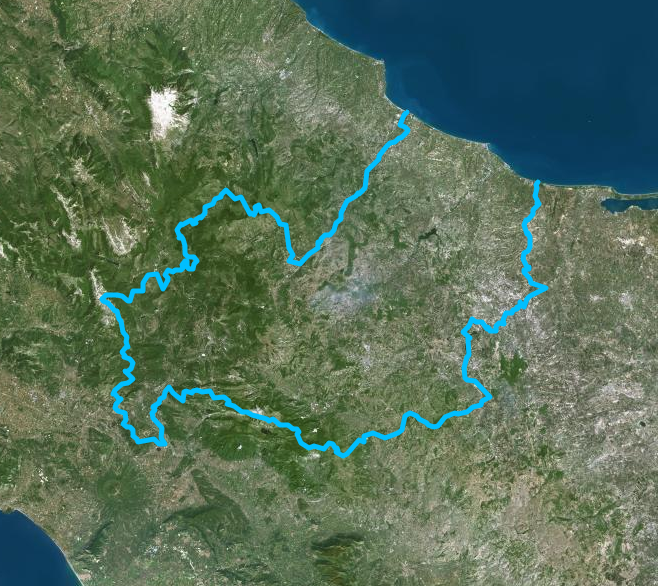
Molise seen from the satellite. Borders traced.

Molise has a surface area of 4,460.65 km^{2} (1,722 sq mi), and it is bordered by Abruzzo to the north, Apulia to the east, Lazio to the west, and Campania to the south. It has 35 kilometres (22 miles) of sandy coastline to the northeast, lying on the Adriatic Sea looking out toward the Tremiti Islands. The countryside of Molise is mostly mountainous, with 55% covered by mountains and most of the rest by hills that go down to the sea.

=== Orography and terrain ===
Molise's territory is mostly mountainous, and the mountainous area spans between the Appennino campano and the Appennino sannita, both tracts of the much longer mountain range of the Apennines. The region also features the Monti della Meta, a minor massif that defines the border between Molise, Lazio and Abruzzo, the Monti delle Mainarde and the Monti del Matese, both minor mountain chains.

=== Hydrography ===
Part of the border between Molise and Abruzzo is defined by the course of the Trigno, and part of the border between Molise and Apulia (Province of Foggia) is defined by there course of the Fortore. Other important rivers are the Biferno and the Sangro. The Volturno, the main river in southern Italy in terms of length and basin size, and the Tammaro originate in Molise. The region is in general very rich in water resources.

Molise does not have on its territory natural lakes of relevant size. The biggest lakes in the region are the Lago di Guardialfiera and the Lago di Occhito, both artificial lakes, the latter being shared with Apulia.

=== Climate ===
The climate of Molise can be classified with the Köppen climate classification as Mediterranean. Temperature gets lower significantly in the inland.

== Demographics ==
As of 2026, the population is 285,940, of which 49.7% are male, and 50.3% are female. Minors make up 12.8% of the population, and seniors make up 27.8%.

Historical population
Year	Pop.	±%
1861	355,138	—
1871	374,415	+5.4%
1881	381,712	+1.9%
1901	394,953	+3.5%
1911	396,070	+0.3%
1921	382,653	−3.4%
1931	377,304	−1.4%
1936	388,268	+2.9%
1951	406,823	+4.8%
1961	358,052	−12.0%
1971	319,807	−10.7%
1981	328,371	+2.7%
1991	330,900	+0.8%
2001	320,601	−3.1%
2011	313,660	−2.2%
2021	292,150	−6.9%
Source: ISTAT

At 64.1 inhabitants per km^{2}, the population density of Molise is far below the national density of 195.1. The region covers 1.5% of Italy's territory and less than 1% of its population. Out of the region's 2 provinces, the larger province in terms of area is Campobasso at 2,925.41 square kilometres (1,129.51 sq mi), while the smaller is Isernia at 1,535.24 square kilometres (592.76 sq mi). The province of Campobasso is the more densely populated of the two provinces, with 71.0 inhabitants per km^{2}, whereas Isernia registers 51.0 inhabitants per km^{2}.

In the period 1951–71, large-scale emigration to other countries of the European Union, to other parts of Italy and overseas led to a significant decline in the population of Molise. Negative net migration persisted until 1981. Large-scale emigration has caused many of the smaller towns and villages to lose over 60% of their population, while only a small number of larger towns have recorded significant gains. From 1982 to 1994, net migration has been positive, then followed by a negative trend until 2001. Between 2011 and 2021, the population decreased by 6.9%.

The region is home to two main ethnic minorities: the Molisan Croats (20,000 people who speak an old Dalmatian dialect of Croatian alongside Italian), and those who speak the Arbëresh dialect of Albanian in five towns of "basso Molise" in the province of Campobasso.

=== Immigration ===
As of 2025, immigrants make up 9.4% of the population. The 5 largest foreign countries of birth are Romania, Argentina, Germany, Switzerland, and Morocco.

Foreign population by country of birth (2025)
Country of birth	Population
Romania	2,921
Argentina	2,908
Germany	2,178
Switzerland	2,096
Morocco	1,561
Venezuela	1,217
Albania	897
Ukraine	798
United Kingdom	761
Pakistan	719
Canada	707
France	686
Bangladesh	663
Brazil	629
Nigeria	560

== Government and politics ==
=== Administrative divisions ===
Molise is subdivided into two provinces:

Province	Population (2026)	Area (km^{2})	Density (inh./km^{2})	Municipalities
Province of Campobasso	207,723	2,925.41	71.0	84
Province of Isernia	78,217	1,535.24	51.0	52

== Main sights and monuments ==
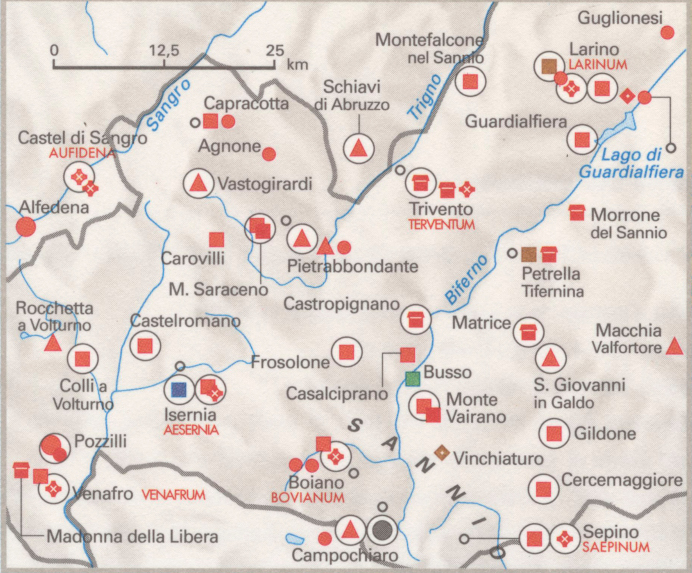
Archeological sites of Molise

=== Campobasso ===
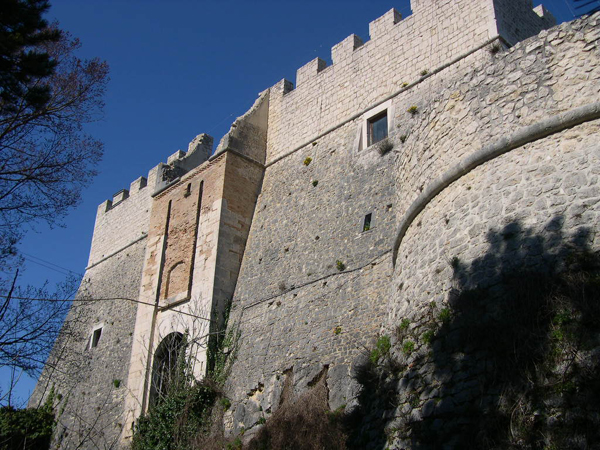
Castello Monforte

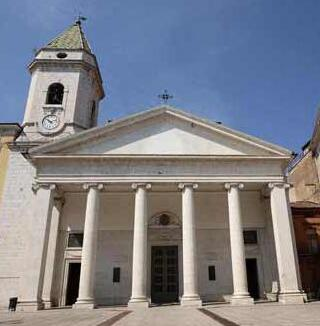
Campobasso's Cathedral

- Castello Monforte
- Terzano Tower
- Campobasso Cathedral (Santissima Trinità)
- Castello Cercemaggiore
- Church of Sant'Antonio
- Church of San Bartolomeo
- Church of San Giorgio
- Savoia Theater
- San Giorgio Palace (Head of municipality)
- Provincial Museum of "Sanniti"

=== Isernia ===
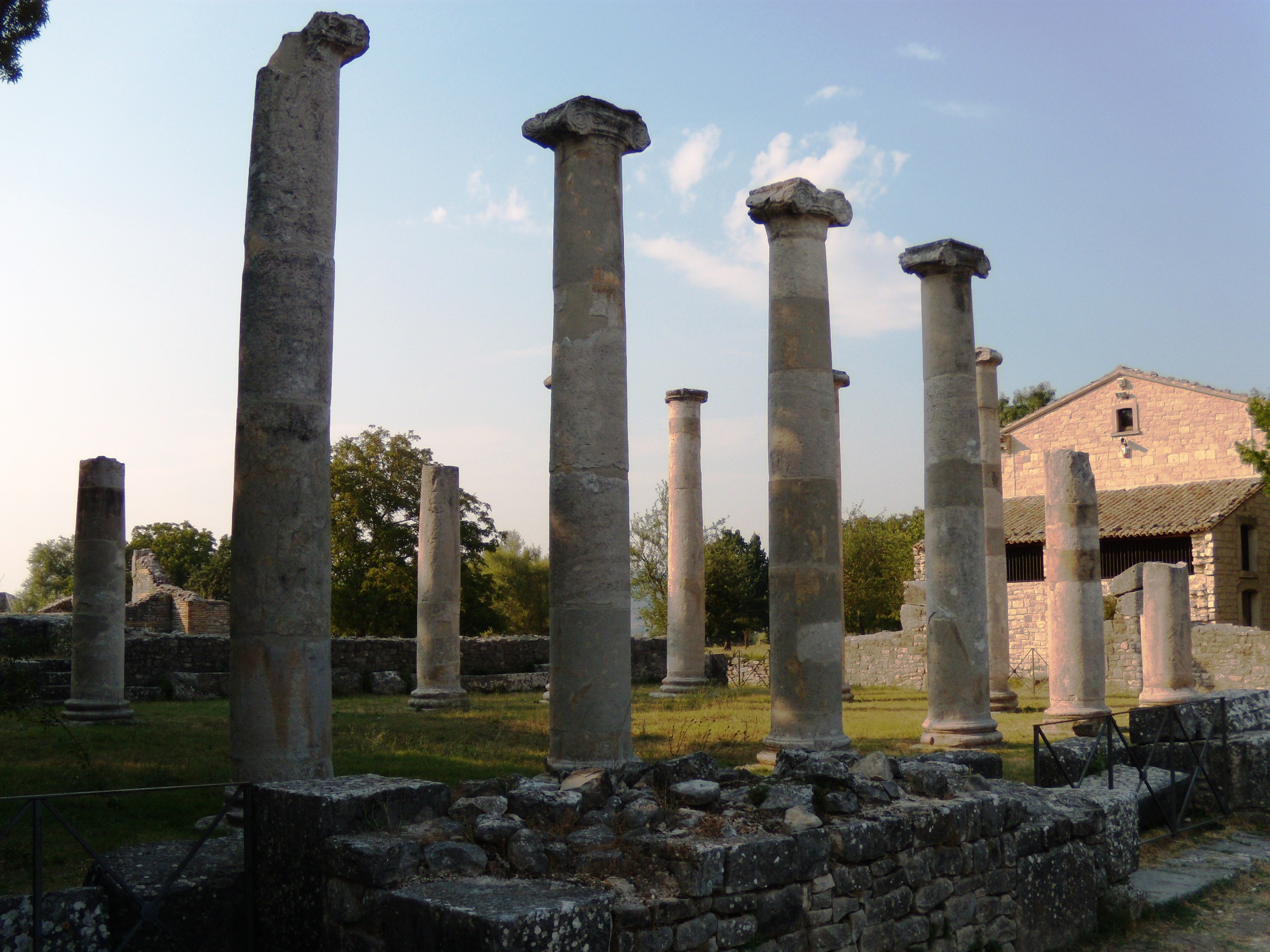
Altilia (Sepino)

- Isernia Cathedral (San Pietro)
- Fountain Fraterna
- Monumental complex and museum of Santa Maria delle Monache Abbey
- Sanctuary of Santi Cosma e Damiano
- Archeological site Isernia La Pineta
- Museum of Paleolithic in the site of La Pineta
- Parco Nazionale d'Abruzzo, Lazio e Molise

=== Termoli ===
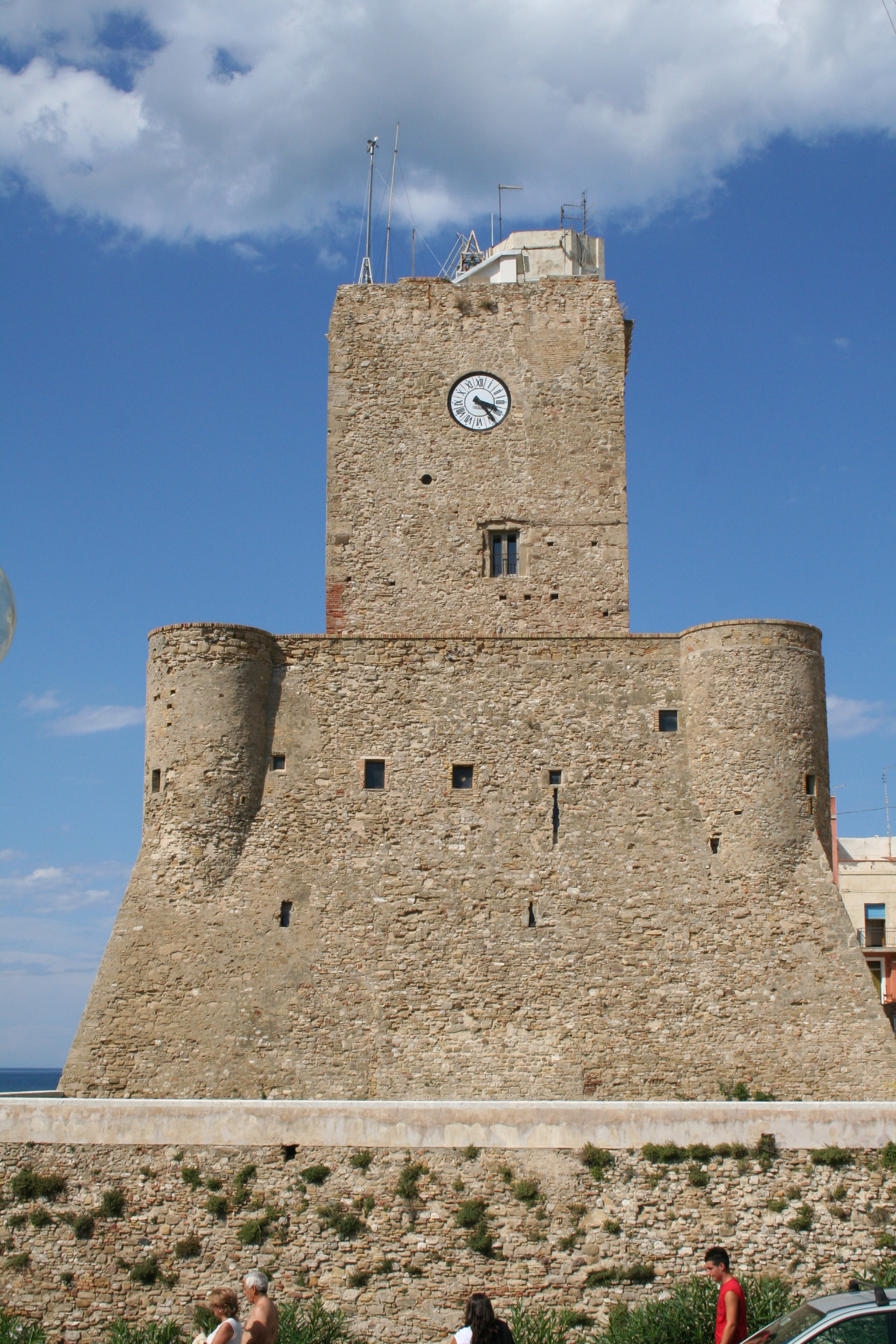
Castle of Termoli

- Cathedral of San Basso from Lucera
- Medieval castle of Frederick II
- Sinarca Tower
- Rinascimental Gallery Museum
- Monumento dei Caduti
- Statues of Benito Jacovitti and Girolamo la Penna

=== Venafro ===
- Castle Pandone
- Venafro Cathedral
- Archeogical Museum of Venafro
- War Museum Winterline Venafro

=== Province of Campobasso ===
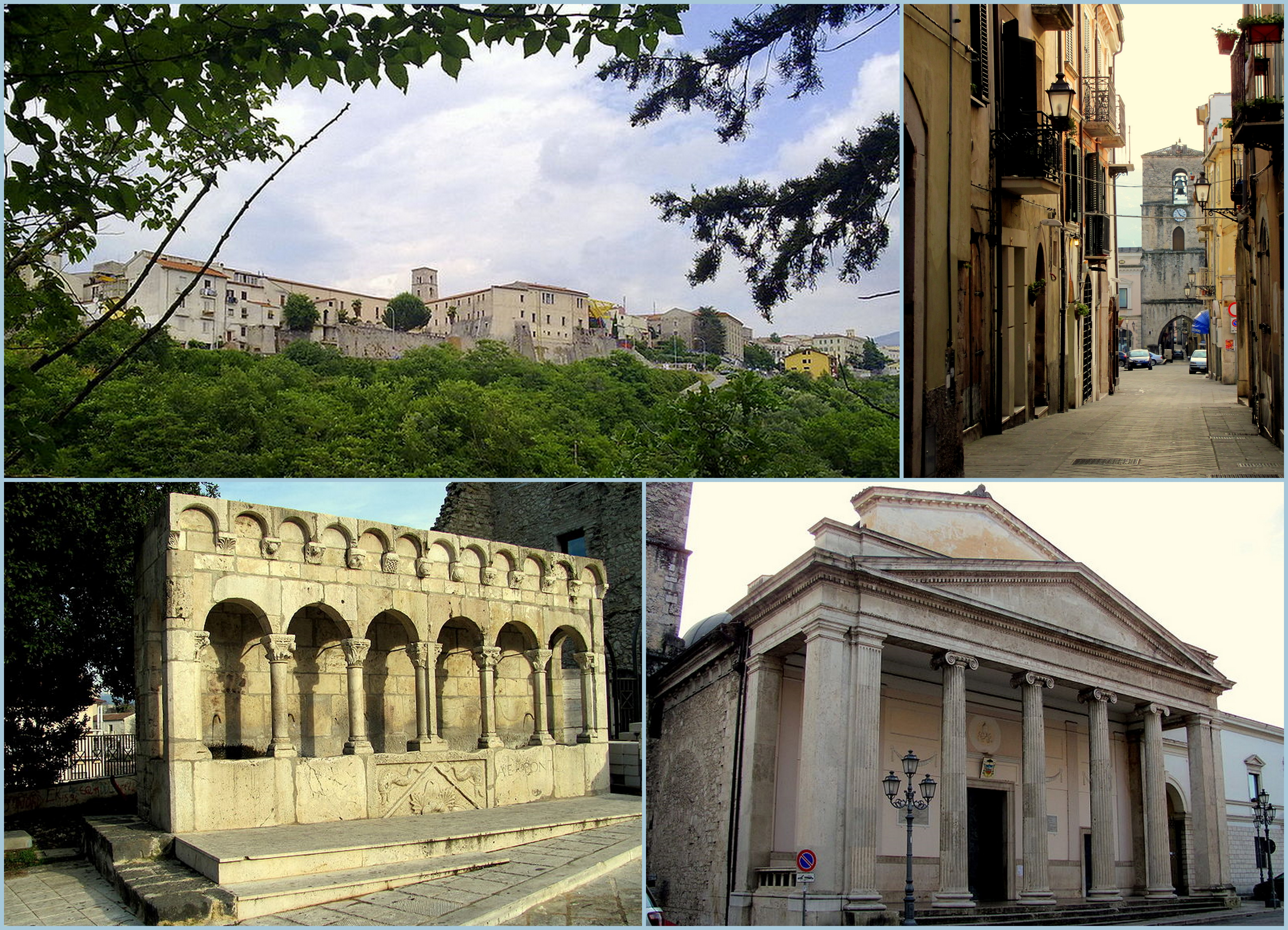
Isernia collage

- Trivento Cathedral
- Church of Santa Maria Maggiore (Guglionesi)
- Santuario di Santa Maria del Canneto (Roccavivara)
- Caldora Castle (Carpinone)
- Castle Anjou (Civitacampomarano)
- Longobard Castle (Tufara)
- Bojano Cathedral (San Bartolomeo)
- Medieval fortress Civita Superiore (Bojano)
- Angioina Tower (Colletorto)
- Larino Cathedral
- Archeological site and Roman theater of Larinum (Larino)
- Archeological site and museum of Altilia (Sepino)
- Italic sanctuary of San Pietro dei Cantoni (Sepino)
- Megalithic wall of Saipins (Terravecchia zone – Sepino)
- Church of Santa Maria della Strada (Matrice)
- Guardialfiera old town
- Capua castle (Gambatesa)

=== Province of Isernia ===
- Abbey of San Vincenzo al Volturno (Castel San Vincenzo)
- Marinelli Bells Factory and Museum (Agnone)
- Theatre and Italic temple in the archeological site of Pietrabbondante
- Parish church and belfry of Saint Silvestro (Bagnoli del Trigno)
- Bagnoli del Trigno (The pearl of Molise)
- Rupestrian church of Pietracupa
- Church of Sant'Antonio Abate (Pietracupa)
- Capracotta
- Neogothic basilica of Santa Maria Addolorata (Castelpetroso)
- Venafro Cathedral
- Castle Pandone (Venafro)
- Castle Pandone (Cerro al Volturno)
- Abbey of Santa Maria del Carmelo (Roccavivara)
- Castle D'Alessandro (Pescolanciano)
- Colli a Volturno
- Fornelli

== Culture ==
Molise has much tradition from the religious to the pagan, many museums, archeological sites, musical and food events.

Tradition

- The Festival dei Misteri in Campobasso (Corpus Domini)
- Feast of Saint Pardo with ox chariot (cart) in Larino (25-26-27/May)
- Ox chariots (La Carrese) and feast of Saint Leo in San Martino in Pensilis (30 April and 2 May)
- The Ndocciata of Agnone (8-24/December)
- The Saint Basso feast in Termoli with procession of boats on the sea (4 August)
- "U lut'm sab't d'April" of Santa Croce di Magliano with benediction of animals (Last Saturday of April)
- Procession of Good Friday in Campobasso
- The procession of hooded on the Good Friday at Isernia
- The fire of Saint Anthony the Abbot in Colletorto (17 January)
- The feast of Saint Nicandro in Venafro (17 June)
- The ox chariots and feast in the village of Ururi and Portocannone
- The feast of San Biagio in San Biase (3 February), with the traditional game of the Morra and the distribution of Bread to all the inhabitants

Arts, musical and food festivals

- The international bagpipe festival of Scapoli in July
- The "Pezzata" of Capracotta the first Sunday of August
- The fish festival of Termoli in August
- The Staffoli Horses in August close Agnone
- The grape feast of Riccia in September
- The grain feast of Jelsi on 26 July
- The international festival of folk in the Matese in San Massimo
- The exhibition of black truffle in San Pietro Avellana
- The carnival of Larino in February
- "Gl' Cierv" in the carnival of Castelnuovo del Volturno the last Sunday of February

Museums

- National museum of paleolithic in Isernia
- Monumental complex and museum of Santa Maria delle Monache in Isernia
- Museum of "Tombolo" in Isernia
- Provincial museum of Samnium in Campobasso
- Museum of Zampogna (Bagpipe) in Scapoli
- Antiquarium of Saepinum-Altilia in Sepino
- Photographic museum "Tony Vaccaro" in Bonefro
- Archeological museum of Venafro
- War Museum Winterline Venafro
- Santa Chiara Museum Venafro

=== Cuisine ===
The cuisine of Molise is similar to the that of Abruzzo, though there are some differences in the dishes and ingredients. The flavors of Molise are dominated by the many aromatic herbs that grow there. Some of the characteristic foods include spicy salami, a variety of locally produced cheeses, dishes using lamb or goat, pasta dishes with hearty sauces, and vegetables that grow in the region.

In addition to bruschetta, a typical antipasto will consist of any of several meat dishes, such as the sausages capocollo, the fennel-seasoned salsiccie al finocchio, soppressata, ventricina, frascateglie or sanguinaccio. In addition to these sausages, a variety of ham is available, such as smoked prosciutto. Frequently, the sausages are eaten with polenta.

Main dishes of the region include:

- Brodosini made of tagliatelle in broth with pork cheek and fat
- Calcioni di ricotta, a specialty of Campobasso, made of fried pasta stuffed with ricotta, provolone, prosciutto, and parsley, and usually served with fried artichokes, cauliflower, brains, sweetbread, potato croquette, and scamorza cheese
- Cavatiegl e Patane, or gnocchi served in a meat sauce of rabbit and pork
- A variety of pasta such as cavatelli, lasagna, or maccheroni served with a ragù of lamb or goat
- Pasta e fagioli, pasta-and-white-bean soup cooked with pig's feet and pork rinds
- Polenta d'iragn, a polenta-like dish actually made of wheat and potatoes, sauced with raw tomatoes and pecorino
- Risotto alla marinara, a risotto with seafood
- Spaghetti with diavolillo, a strong chili pepper sauce
- Zuppa di cardi, a soup of cardoons, tomatoes, onions, pancetta, olive oil
- Zuppa di ortiche, a soup of nettle stems, tomatoes, onions, pancetta, olive oil

Common second dishes (often meat and vegetable dishes) are:

- Lamb, the most popular meat, served grilled, roasted, or stewed
- Many organ meats of lamb, especially tripe, are popular
- Coniglio alla molisana, grilled rabbit pieces skewered with sausage and herbs
- Mazzarelle, tightly wrapped rolls made with lung and tripe of lamb
- Ragù d' agnello, braised lamb with sweet peppers, a specialty of Isernia
- Torcinelli, rolled strips of lamb tripe, sweetbreads, and liver
- Pamparella or pork pancetta dried with peperoncino, soaked in wine and cut into small pieces. Pamparella is used to flavor sauces, in particular the sauce for dressing the tacconi, a rustic pasta made with flour and water.
- Saucicc', Paparuol' e Ova Fritte, sausage with sweet pepper and fried eggs

Typical vegetable dishes may include:

- Carciofi ripieni, artichokes stuffed with anchovies and capers
- Peeled sweet peppers stuffed with breadcrumbs, anchovies, parsley, basil and peperoncino, sautéed in a frying pan and cooked with chopped tomatoes
- Cipollacci con pecorino, fried strong onions and pecorino cheese
- Frittata con basilico e cipolle, omelette with basil and onions

Fish dishes include red mullet soup, and spaghetti with cuttlefish. Trout from the Biferno river is cooked with a simple but sauce of aromatic herbs. Zuppa di pesce, a fish stew, is a specialty of Termoli.

The cheeses produced in Molise are not very different from those produced in Abruzzo. The more common ones are Burrino and Manteca, soft, buttery cow's-milk cheeses; Pecorino, sheep's-milk cheese, served young and soft or aged and hard, called also "Maciuocco" in Molise; Scamorza, bland cow's-milk cheese, often served grilled; and Caciocavallo, sheep's-milk cheese.

Sweets and desserts have an ancient tradition here and are linked to the history of the territory and to religious and family festivities. Most common are:

- Calciumi (also called caucioni or cauciuni), sweet ravioli filled with chestnuts, almonds, chocolate, vanilla, cooked wine musts, and cinnamon and then fried
- Ciambelline, ring-shaped cakes made in the countryside. They may be all'olio (with olive oil) or al vino rosso (with red wine).
- Ferratelle all'anice, anise cakes made in metal molds and stamped with special patterns
- Ricotta pizza, a cake pan filled with a blend of ricotta cheese, sugar, flour, butter, maraschino liqueur, and chocolate chips

=== Internet Culture ===
Molise's small size and relative obscurity led it to become the subject of a popular internet meme: "Molise doesn't exist".

== Economy ==
Agriculture, involving small and micro holdings, is currently offering high-quality products. The agricultural holdings produce wine, cereals, olive oil, vegetables, fruits and dairy products. Traditional products are Grass Pea (cicerchia) and Farro. Molise's autochthonous grape is Tintilia which has been rediscovered during the last ten years, and many other PDO (DOP) wines, both red and white.

Though there is a large Fiat plant in Termoli, the industrial sector is dominated by the farming industry with small and medium-sized farms spread widely throughout the region. Another important industry is food processing: pasta, meat, milk products, oil and wine are the traditional products of the region. In the services sector the most important industries are distribution, hotels and catering, followed by transport and communications, banking and insurance. With few exceptions, in all sectors firms are small, and this explains the difficulties encountered when marketing products on a national scale.

International tourism is growing largely as a result of the recent opening of international flights from other European countries to Pescara Airport, which is not far to the north in Abruzzo and connected to Molise by the A14 highway (the only highway passing through Molise, by Termoli).

The unemployment rate stood at 9.5% in 2020.

=== Tourism ===
Molise has many small and picturesque villages. Four of them have been selected by I Borghi più belli d'Italia (English: 'The most beautiful villages of Italy'), a non-profit private association of small Italian towns of strong historical and artistic interest, founded on the initiative of the Tourism Council of the National Association of Italian Municipalities.

== Transport ==
The region doesn't have its own airport. However, other airports such as Abruzzo Airport, Bari Airport, Naples International Airport and Rome Fiumicino Airport are also used by air travellers from the region.

== Twin towns – sister cities ==
Molise is twinned with:

- Nowy Sącz, Poland

== See also ==
- 2002 Molise earthquakes
- Ndocciata, a torchlit parade traditionally held in Molise on Christmas Eve
- Molise Croats
