= Colletorto =

- Comune
- Comune di Colletorto
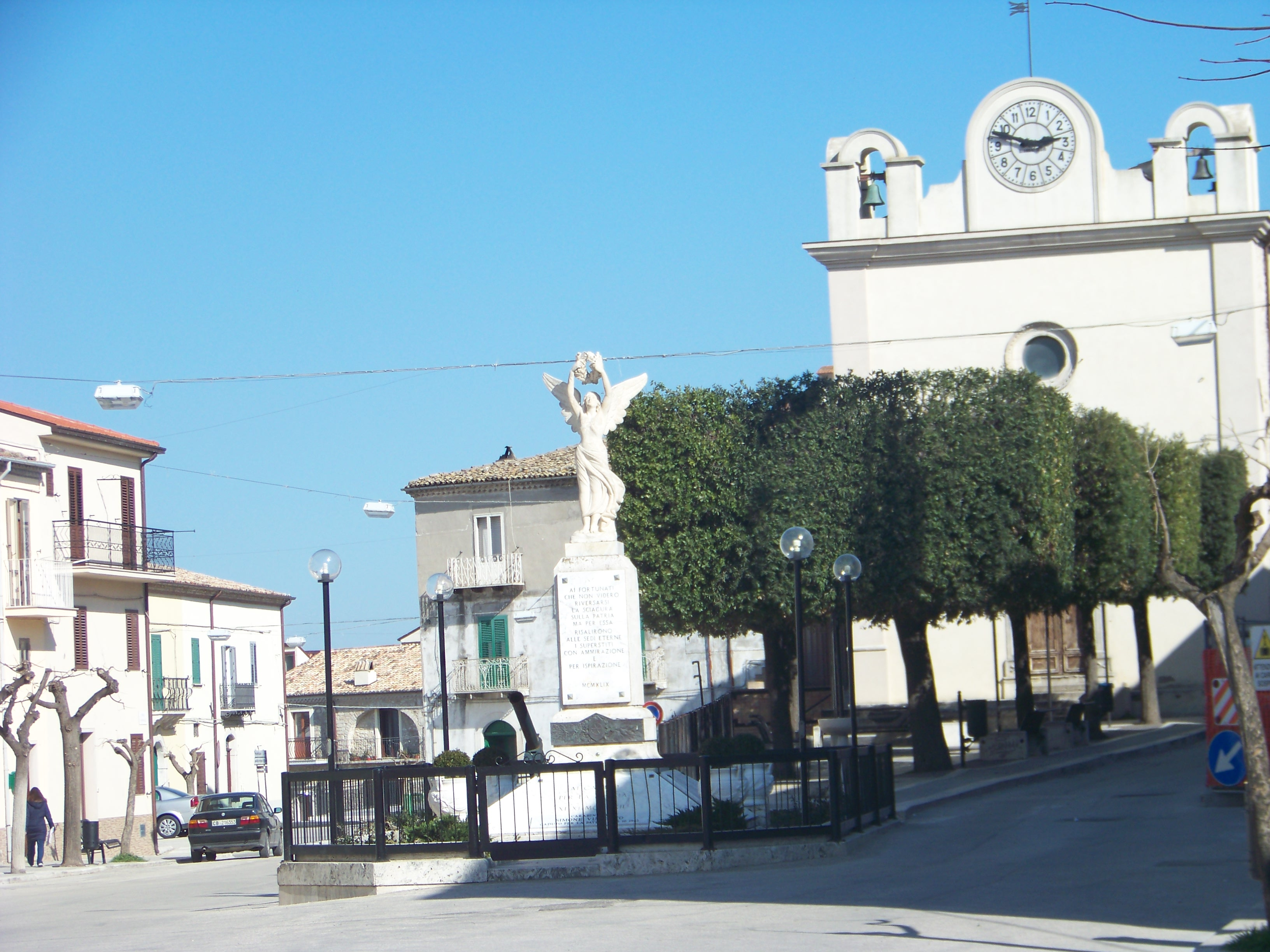
- Monument and church of Purgatorio in Colletorto

- Coat of arms

- Location within Italy Location within Molise
- Coordinates: 41°40′N 14°58′E
- Country: Italy
- Region: Molise
- Province: Campobasso (CB)

Government
  - Mayor: Cosimo Damiano Mele (Lista civica: "Un futuro per Colletorto")

Area
  - Total: 35.91 km^{2} (13.86 sq mi)
- Elevation: 515 m (1,690 ft)

Population (November 2024)
  - Total: 1,626
  - Density: 45.28/km^{2} (117.3/sq mi)
- Demonym: Colletortesi
- Time zone: UTC+1 (CET)
  - Summer (DST): UTC+2 (CEST)
- Postal code: 86044
- Dialing code: 0874
- Patron saint: St. John the Baptist
- Saint day: 29 August
- Website: Official website

Colletorto is a comune (municipality) in the province of Campobasso in the southern Italian region of Molise. As of November 2024, it has a population of 1,626.

== Geography ==
Colletorto is built on a hill 508 m above sea level. The lowest point is 98 m above sea level in the Fortore river valley, and the highest point is 776 m above sea level at the top of Monte Crocella. The hills around Colletorto are covered in maquis shrubland, oak forest, olive trees, cereal fields, and fodder.

The Fortore river passes through the comune. The Lago di Occhito, an artificial lake on the Fortore River at the Molise–Apulia border, is located near Colletorto. Important streams include the Cigno stream, which flows into the Lago di Occhito, and a stream in the Santa Maria valley that feeds the Fortore.

The comune is divided into two parts: the upper part is called Colle 'Hill', and the lower is named Terra 'Earth'. The main road, Corso Vittorio Emanuele, begins in Terra and crosses the historic district of Campo dei Fiori 'Field of Flowers'. The district contains the Mother Church of Saint John the Baptist, the Palazzo Marchesale (now the town hall), and the Angioina Tower. The Gargano peninsula, Lake Lesina, the Adriatic Sea, and the Tremiti Islands can be seen from the Agioina Tower.

Colletorto borders the municipalities of Carlantino, Casalnuovo Monterotaro, San Giuliano di Puglia, and Sant'Elia a Pianisi.

== Points of interest ==
Angioina Tower was built in 1369 by Queen Joanna I of Naples on an old Norman castle, the walls of which are still visible. The 25 m tower is the main monument and symbol of Colletorto. A private family donated the tower to the local council in 1959, and the most recent restoration was in 2012.

The Palazzo Marchesale, which now serves as the town hall, was built in the 18th century by the Cremonese patrician Bartolomeo Rota, who reigned over the comune at the time. The palace was built upon the remains of the same castle as the Angioina Tower. It has two entrances on two different streets. The main facade faces the square where the main church, the Mother Church of Saint John the Baptist, is located.

The Mother Church of Saint John the Baptist was built in 1730. The church has a single central nave and no chapels. Niches under the arches of the side walls contain statues of saints, and there is an altar at the front of the room. Inside the church, there is a 1751 painting by Paolo Gamba, "The Holy Family", and an older painting on wood by Antonio Solario, "The Madonna of Purity". The church also contains relics of Saint Theodore, Saint Victorin, Saint Clementine, and Saint Gioconda.

The Monastery of Saint Alfonso was built in 1728 at the expense of marquis Bartolomeo Rota and with the approval of Giovanni Andrea Tria, the bishop of Larino. The monastery contains statues by Paolo Saverio Di Zinno and a painting by Placido Flaxis. The church was seriously damaged by the 2002 Molise earthquakes but has since been completely restored.

The Church of Purgatory, now deconsecrated, was built c. 1700–1726 and legally recognized in 1776 by a royal decree from Ferdinand I of the Two Sicilies. Since the 2002 earthquakes, it has been used as a conference hall and showroom. It is located inside the ancient town walls at the end of the main street. It represents the entrance to the ancient part of the comune through two old doors, Campo dei Fiori and Porta Nuova in the direction of the parish. The Church has a large clock – one of the largest in the region – between two small bell towers. A low relief of a skull is carved on the portal to remind churchgoers to behave righteously.

The Chapel of Our Lady of Loreto is surrounded by olive trees on a hill 3 km away from Colletorto. It was built by bishop Persio Caracci in 1638. The church underwent restoration in the 1990s.

The Chapel of Saint Rocco is located in the cemetery 2 km away from the comune.

== Economy ==
Colletorto's economy depends on the production of cereals and extra virgin olive oil. The oliva nera di Colletorto is a cultivar of olive native to Colletorto that is used to produce Molise DOP olive oil. The municipality has joined the National Association of the Cities of Oil to promote its olive oil. Colletorto has about 250,000 trees that produce around three million kg of olives per year.

The comune has a paper factory and many oil mills and private workshops. A health center for elderly persons is under construction.

== Transportation ==
Colletorto is connected by public bus to the nearest towns and urban centers. The closest train station is the Bonefro–Santa Croce station, which is 14 km away on the regional Termoli–Venafro railway.

== Culture ==
The comune celebrates the Feast of Saint Anthony on 17 January. The feast is an ancient festival particular to Colletorto that mixes Christian and pagan traditions and marks the beginning of the carnival. Food, drink, and music last all night and center around bonfires that are prepared in each quarter of the comune. On 29 August, the Feast of Saint John is held for Colletorto's patron saint. Near the summer solstice, the sun rises over the sea towards the Gargano peninsula. According to local tradition, the head of John the Baptist can be seen by looking toward the peninsula on the morning of 24 June.

== Twin towns ==
Colletorto is twinned with:

- Saint-Yrieix-sur-Charente, France
- Bari, Italy
- Pano Lefkara, Cyprus
- Xgħajra, Malta
- Alsónémedi, Hungary
- Pelplin, Poland
