= Campodipietra =

- Comune
- Comune di Campodipietra
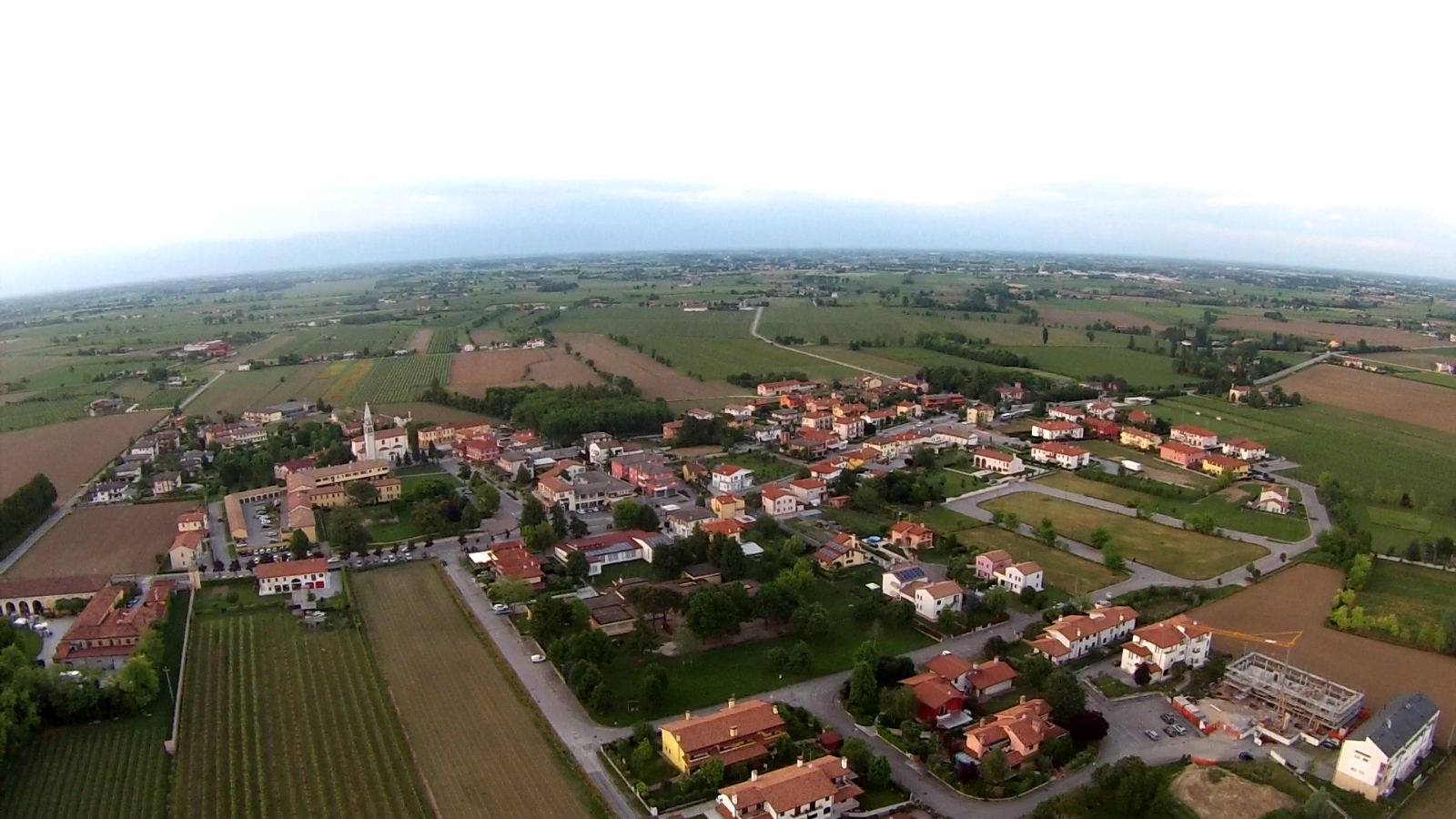
- View of Campodipietra

- Coat of arms

- Location within Italy Location within Molise
- Coordinates: 41°33′N 14°45′E
- Country: Italy
- Region: Molise
- Province: Campobasso (CB)

Government
  - Mayor: Giuseppe Notartomaso

Area
  - Total: 19.72 km^{2} (7.61 sq mi)
- Elevation: 520 m (1,710 ft)

Population (30 November 2017)
  - Total: 2,515
  - Density: 127.5/km^{2} (330.3/sq mi)
- Demonym: Campopetresi
- Time zone: UTC+1 (CET)
  - Summer (DST): UTC+2 (CEST)
- Postal code: 86010
- Dialing code: 0874
- Website: Official website

Campodipietra is a comune (municipality) in the Province of Campobasso in the Italian region Molise, located about 7 kilometres (4 mi) east of Campobasso.

It was built on a rocky spur around the church of San Martino, which rises in the place of the ancient barons' castle, by a colony of German soldiers in the 13th century. The original borough was surrounded by walls, where only three doors opened. There is another smaller church, San Bonaventura, connected to a peculiar story: the inhabitants gathered there in 1705 to vote which should be their patron saint between San Bernardino from Siena and San Martino, and the latter was chosen.

Campodipietra borders the following municipalities: Campobasso, Ferrazzano, Gildone, Jelsi, San Giovanni in Galdo, Toro.
