= Jelsi =

- Comune
- Comune di Jelsi
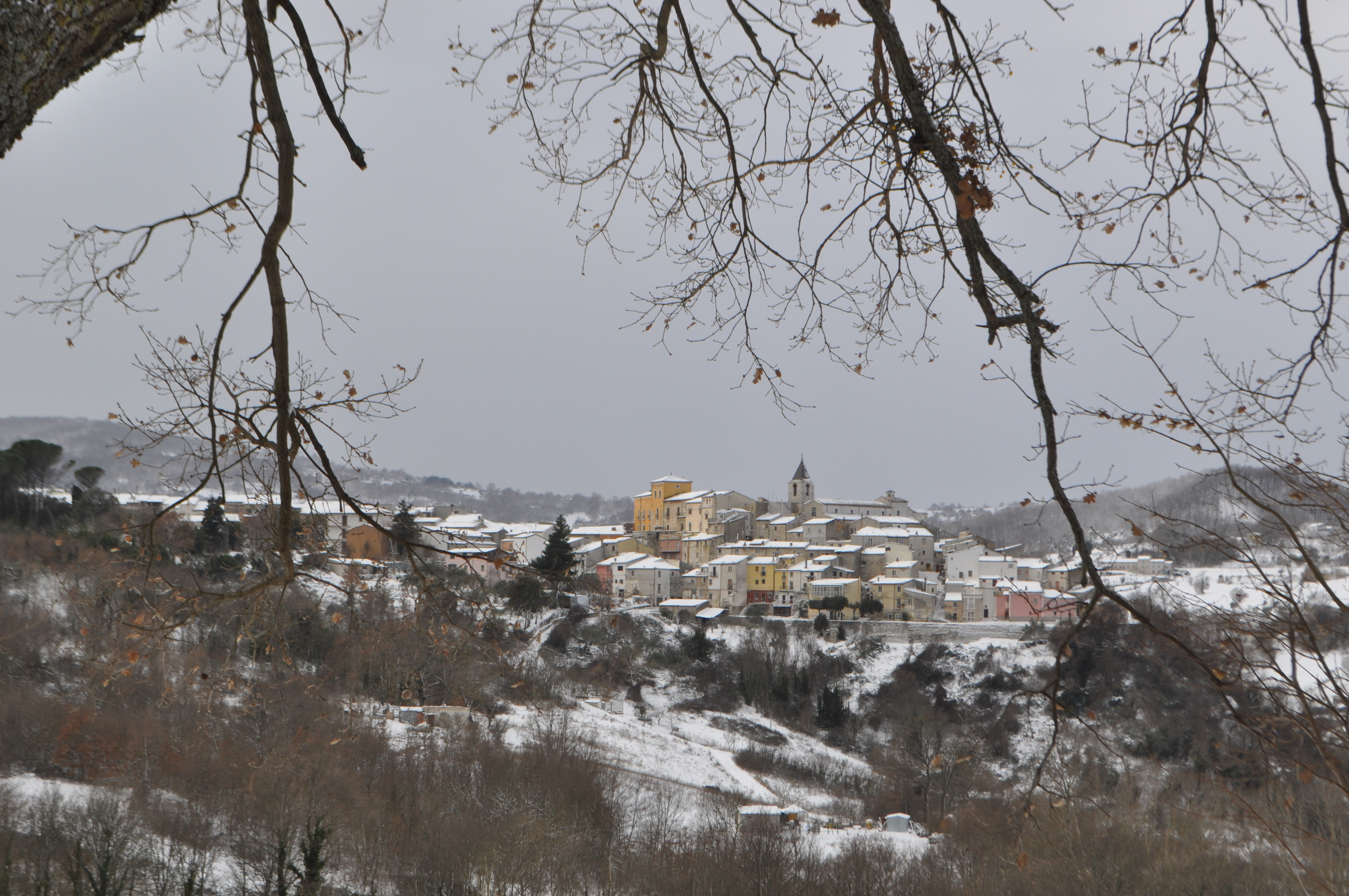
- Skyline of Jelsi

- Coat of arms

- Location within Italy Location within Molise
- Coordinates: 41°31′N 14°48′E
- Country: Italy
- Region: Molise
- Province: Campobasso (CB)

Government
  - Mayor: Salvatore D'Amico

Area
  - Total: 28.5 km^{2} (11.0 sq mi)
- Elevation: 580 m (1,900 ft)

Population (31 December 2017)
  - Total: 1,769
  - Density: 62.1/km^{2} (161/sq mi)
- Demonym: Jelsesi
- Time zone: UTC+1 (CET)
  - Summer (DST): UTC+2 (CEST)
- Postal code: 86015
- Dialing code: 0874
- Website: Official website

Jelsi (or Jevze in local Molisan dialect) is a comune (municipality) in the Province of Campobasso in the Italian region Molise, located about 12 kilometres (7 mi) southeast of Campobasso.

Jelsi borders the following municipalities: Campodipietra, Cercemaggiore, Gildone, Pietracatella, Riccia, Toro.

Each year, the feast of Saint Anne is held here. It is also referred to as the feast of grain. Villagers are free to enter the float competition, in which case they must create a float out of grain, which can or cannot have to do with Saint Anne. If it is pulled by a cow, it is a traglia, but if it is pulled by a small tractor, it is a carro.
