= Toro, Molise =

Toro Ture
- Comune
- Comune di Toro
- Coat of arms

- Location within Italy Location within Molise
- Coordinates: 41°34′N 14°46′E
- Country: Italy
- Region: Molise
- Province: Campobasso (CB)

Government
  - Mayor: Angelo Simonelli

Area
  - Total: 24.0 km^{2} (9.3 sq mi)
- Elevation: 588 m (1,929 ft)

Population (28 February 2010)
  - Total: 1,513
  - Density: 63.0/km^{2} (163/sq mi)
- Demonym: Toresi
- Time zone: UTC+1 (CET)
  - Summer (DST): UTC+2 (CEST)
- Postal code: 86018
- Dialing code: 0874
- Website: Official website

Toro (Molisan: Ture) is a comune (municipality) in the Province of Campobasso in the Italian region Molise, located about 8 kilometres (5 mi) east of Campobasso.

Toro borders the following municipalities: Campodipietra, Jelsi, Monacilioni, Pietracatella, San Giovanni in Galdo.
