= Cercemaggiore =

- Comune
- Comune di Cercemaggiore
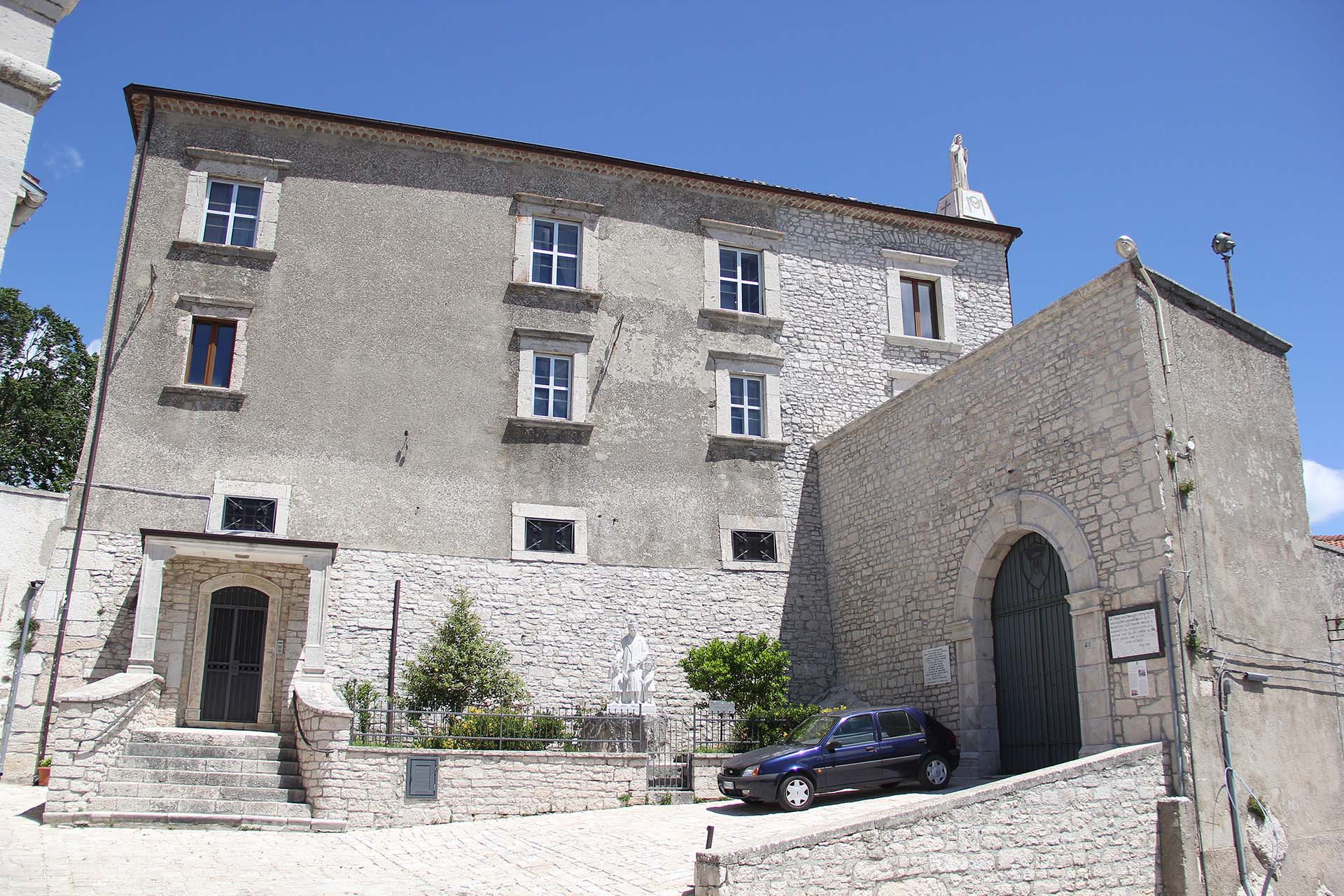
- View of Cercemaggiore

- Coat of arms

- Location within Italy Location within Molise
- Coordinates: 41°28′N 14°43′E
- Country: Italy
- Region: Molise
- Province: Campobasso (CB)

Government
  - Mayor: Vincenza Testa

Area
  - Total: 56.91 km^{2} (21.97 sq mi)
- Elevation: 930 m (3,050 ft)

Population (30 November 2017)
  - Total: 3,717
  - Density: 65.31/km^{2} (169.2/sq mi)
- Demonym: Cercesi
- Time zone: UTC+1 (CET)
  - Summer (DST): UTC+2 (CEST)
- Postal code: 86012
- Dialing code: 0874
- Website: Official website

Cercemaggiore is a comune (municipality) in the Province of Campobasso in the Italian region Molise, located about 12 kilometres (7 mi) southeast of Campobasso.

Cercemaggiore borders the following municipalities: Castelpagano, Cercepiccola, Gildone, Jelsi, Mirabello Sannitico, Morcone, Riccia, Santa Croce del Sannio, Sepino.

== Sister Cities ==
- Greensburg, United States
