= Campolieto =

- Comune
- Comune di Campolieto
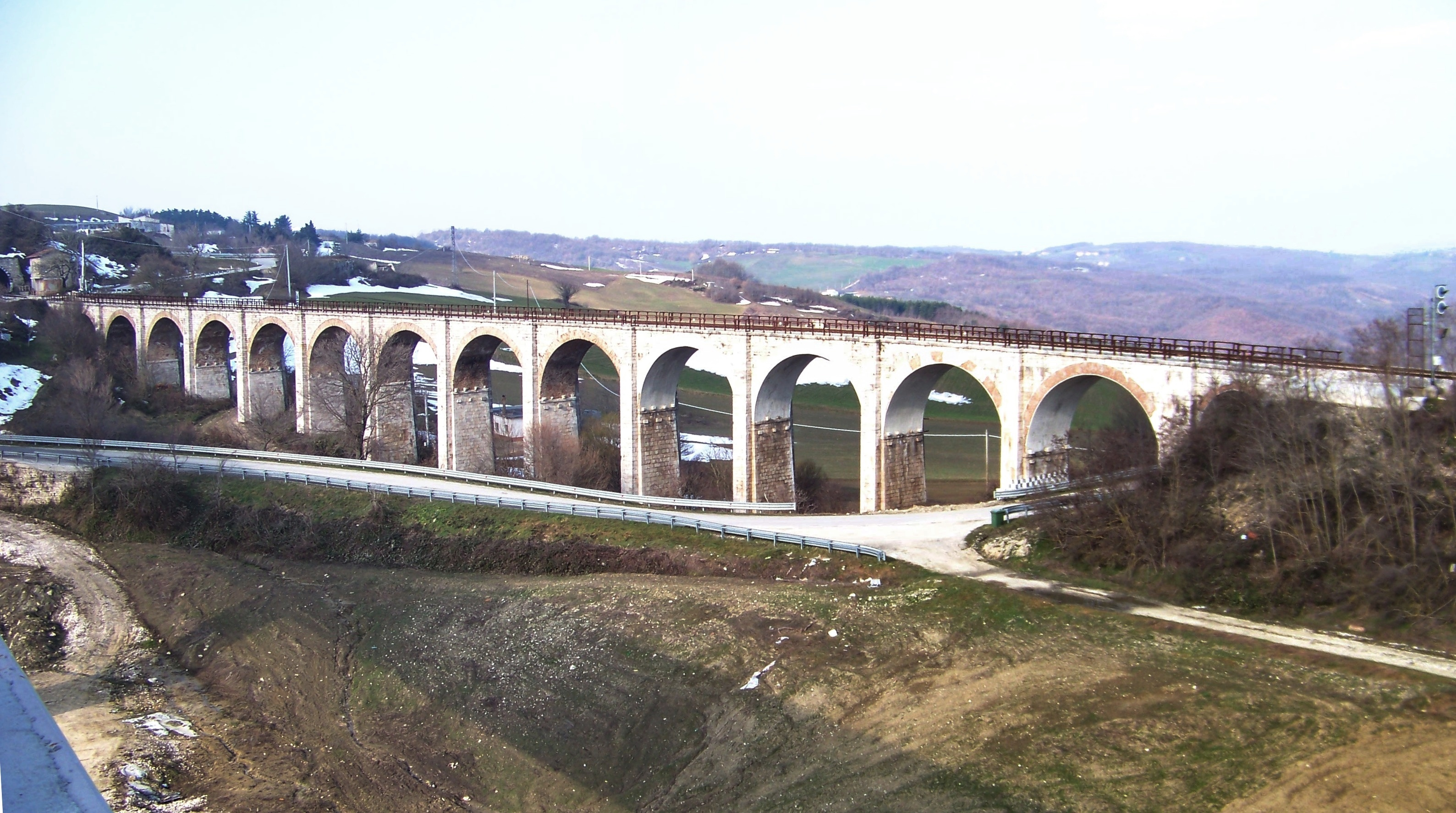
- Railway bridge near Campolieto-monacilioni's train station

- Coat of arms

- Location within Italy Location within Molise
- Coordinates: 41°38′N 14°46′E
- Country: Italy
- Region: Molise
- Province: Campobasso (CB)

Government
  - Mayor: Annamaria Palmiero

Area
  - Total: 24.2 km^{2} (9.3 sq mi)
- Elevation: 735 m (2,411 ft)

Population (30 November 2017)
  - Total: 876
  - Density: 36.2/km^{2} (93.8/sq mi)
- Demonym: Campoletani
- Time zone: UTC+1 (CET)
  - Summer (DST): UTC+2 (CEST)
- Postal code: 86040
- Dialing code: 0874
- Website: Official website

Campolieto is a comune (municipality) in the Province of Campobasso in the Italian region Molise, located about 11 kilometres (7 mi) northeast of Campobasso.

Campolieto borders the following municipalities: Castellino del Biferno, Matrice, Monacilioni, Morrone del Sannio, Ripabottoni, San Giovanni in Galdo.

== Twin towns and sister cities ==
Campolieto is twinned with:

- Arese, Italy (2006)
