= Sant'Elia a Pianisi =

- Comune
- Comune di Sant'Elia a Pianisi
- Location within Italy Location within Molise
- Coordinates: 41°37′N 14°53′E
- Country: Italy
- Region: Molise
- Province: Province of Campobasso (CB)

Area
  - Total: 67.8 km^{2} (26.2 sq mi)

Population (Dec. 2021)
  - Total: 1,585
  - Density: 23.4/km^{2} (60.5/sq mi)
- Demonym: Santeliani
- Time zone: UTC+1 (CET)
  - Summer (DST): UTC+2 (CEST)
- Postal code: 86048
- Dialing code: 0874
- Patron saint: Saint Elijah the Prophet
- Saint day: July 20th
- Website: https://www.comune.santeliaapianisi.cb.it/

Sant'Elia a Pianisi is a comune (municipality) in the Province of Campobasso in the region of Molise, about 20 kilometres (12 mi) northeast of Campobasso. As of 31 December 2021, it had a population of 1,585 and an area of 67.8 square kilometres (26.2 mi^{2}).

Near Sant'Elia, is the Occhito Lake.

The neighbouring comuni are Bonefro, Carlantino, Colletorto, Macchia Valfortore, Monacilioni, Ripabottoni and San Giuliano di Puglia.

The local dialect is Molisano.

== History ==
Until the Unification of Italy in 1861, Sant'Elia a Pianisi was within the Kingdom of the Two Sicilies.

In the 15th century a natural disaster forced the population of Pianisi to move to the lower parts of the abbey, later renamed Sant'Elia a Pianisi.

Pio da Pietrelcina ("Padre Pio") lived in the town for some years.

In 2002, earthquakes occurred near Sant'Elia a Pianisi, causing some damage.

=== Culture ===
Sant'Elia is home to many historical artworks located mostly in the town's religious buildings; most notable of them are Paolo Gamba's first frescoes, which are located in the local Capuchin Convent.

Many local traditions come from Catholicism, most notably feast days of saints. Local religious figures are commonly venerated like Padre Raffaele and Padre Pio.

== Economy ==
The economy of Sant'Elia a Pianisi is based mostly around agriculture, especially wheat, corn, oats, and olive cultivation. The major olive oil company Colavita was founded here in, 1938.

The town formally hosted industries such as: pasta factories, and mills; however most of these were relocated to Campobasso by the 1970s. The town currently has some industry in the form of a biscuit factory and a canning company.

The town has a small tourism industry mostly belonging to religious tourists visiting the Franciscan convent that hosted Padre Pio. As it is located near Lake Occhito, some visitors stay in local homes and hotels.

== Castello di Pianisi (Pianisi Castle) ==
Approximately 3.7 km (2.3 mi) northwest of Sant'Elia, are the ruins of the mediaeval Castello di Pianisi (Pianisi Castle), first mentioned in documents of the second half of the thirteenth century. It is not known how or when the castle was destroyed.

From excavations and research conducted by The University of Molise. The castle also was a church that would have had a capacity of over 400 people. It has also been suggested that the building dates back to the 12th-13th century, which is further suggested by found during excavations, some architectural elements are preserved. The building underwent several changes in the time after the 13th-14th century, when the outside walls of the naves and the bell tower were made stronger through the construction of other walls.

It is still being excavated and investigated.

Materials from the castle were used to build farmhouses, villages, and other structures after its abandonment.

== Symbols ==
The coat of arms and the gonfalon were granted by decree of the President of the Republic on 8 November 1982. sculptural reliefs The coat of arms depicts, on a gold background, Saint Elijah the Prophet standing on a wooden chariot holding a white scarf in his hand. The gonfalon is a red cloth.

== Transportation ==
The SS212 road passes through the town. The railway station is Ripabottoni-S. Elia, on the Termoli-Campobasso and Termoli–Venafro lines.

== Administration ==
The municipality is currently administered by Mayor Biagio Faiella, of the Civic List Let's run together towards the future (lista civica Corriamo insieme verso il futuro) as of June 9, 2024.

== People ==
- Domenico Petrucelli (1816–1901), known as Padre Raffaele da Sant'Elia a Pianisi, Servant of God, born and died here

== Demographic evolution ==
Historical population

Year	Pop.	±%
1861	4,340	—
1871	4,472	+3.0%
1881	5,002	+11.9%
1901	4,812	−3.8%
1911	4,277	−11.1%
1921	4,055	−5.2%

Year	Pop.	±%
1931	4,231	+4.3%
1936	4,424	+4.6%
1951	4,374	−1.1%
1961	3,726	−14.8%
1971	3,060	−17.9%
1981	2,695	−11.9%

Year	Pop.	±%
1991	2,520	−6.5%
2001	2,279	−9.6%
2011	1,910	−16.2%
2021	1,585	−17.0%

Source: Data from ISTAT
