= Pietracatella =

- Comune
- Comune di Pietracatella
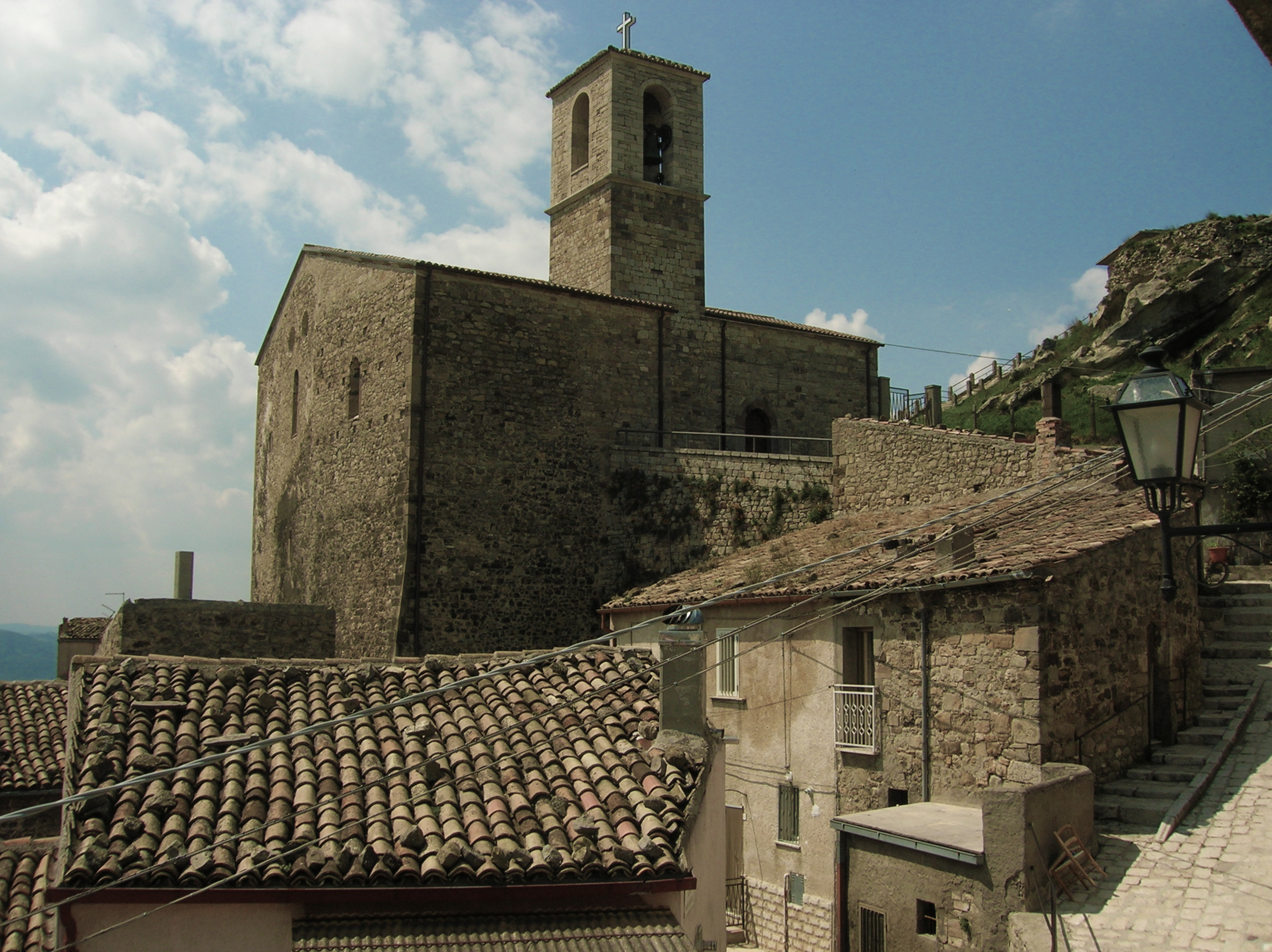
- Church of St. James, Pietracatella

- Location within Italy Location within Molise
- Coordinates: 41°35′N 14°52′E
- Country: Italy
- Region: Molise
- Province: Campobasso (CB)

Government
  - Mayor: Luciano Pasquale

Area
  - Total: 50.0 km^{2} (19.3 sq mi)
- Elevation: 721 m (2,365 ft)

Population (30 November 2017).
  - Total: 1,309
  - Density: 26.2/km^{2} (67.8/sq mi)
- Demonym: Pietracatellesi
- Time zone: UTC+1 (CET)
  - Summer (DST): UTC+2 (CEST)
- Postal code: 86040
- Dialing code: 0874
- Website: Official website

Pietracatella is a comune (municipality) in the Province of Campobasso, in the Italian region of Molise, located about 15 kilometres (9 mi) east of Campobasso.

Pietracatella borders the municipalities of Gambatesa, Jelsi, Macchia Valfortore, Sant'Elia a Pianisi, Monacilioni, Riccia and Toro.

== Demographic evolution ==
Historical population

Year	Pop.	±%
1861	3,295	—
1871	3,354	+1.8%
1881	3,504	+4.5%
1901	3,425	−2.3%
1911	3,198	−6.6%

Year	Pop.	±%
1921	3,008	−5.9%
1931	3,234	+7.5%
1936	3,301	+2.1%
1951	3,413	+3.4%
1961	3,137	−8.1%

Year	Pop.	±%
1971	2,342	−25.3%
1981	1,915	−18.2%
1991	1,696	−11.4%
2001	1,600	−5.7%

Source: Data from ISTAT
