= Lago di Occhito =

Reservoir at the Molise–Apulia border in Italy

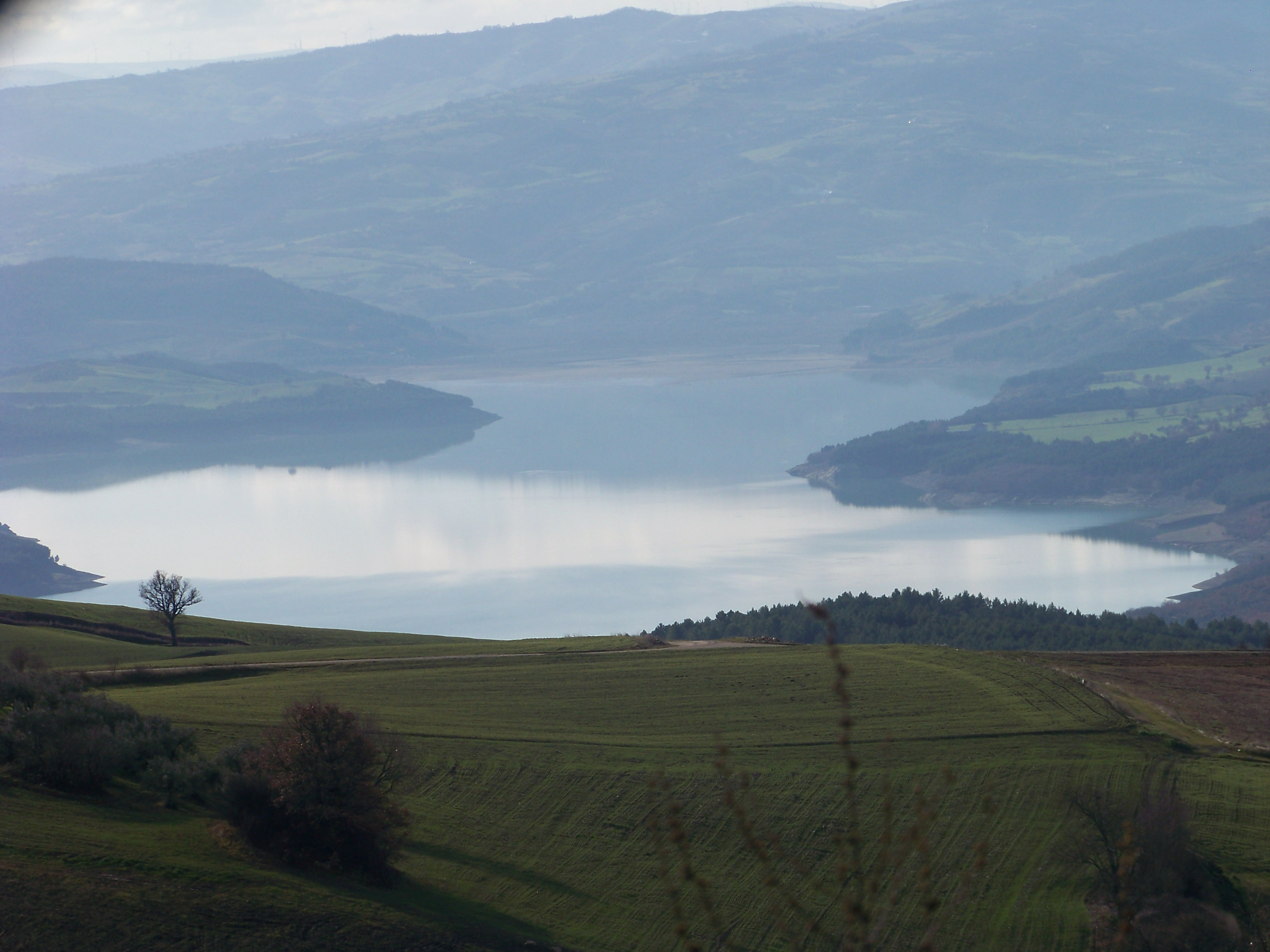

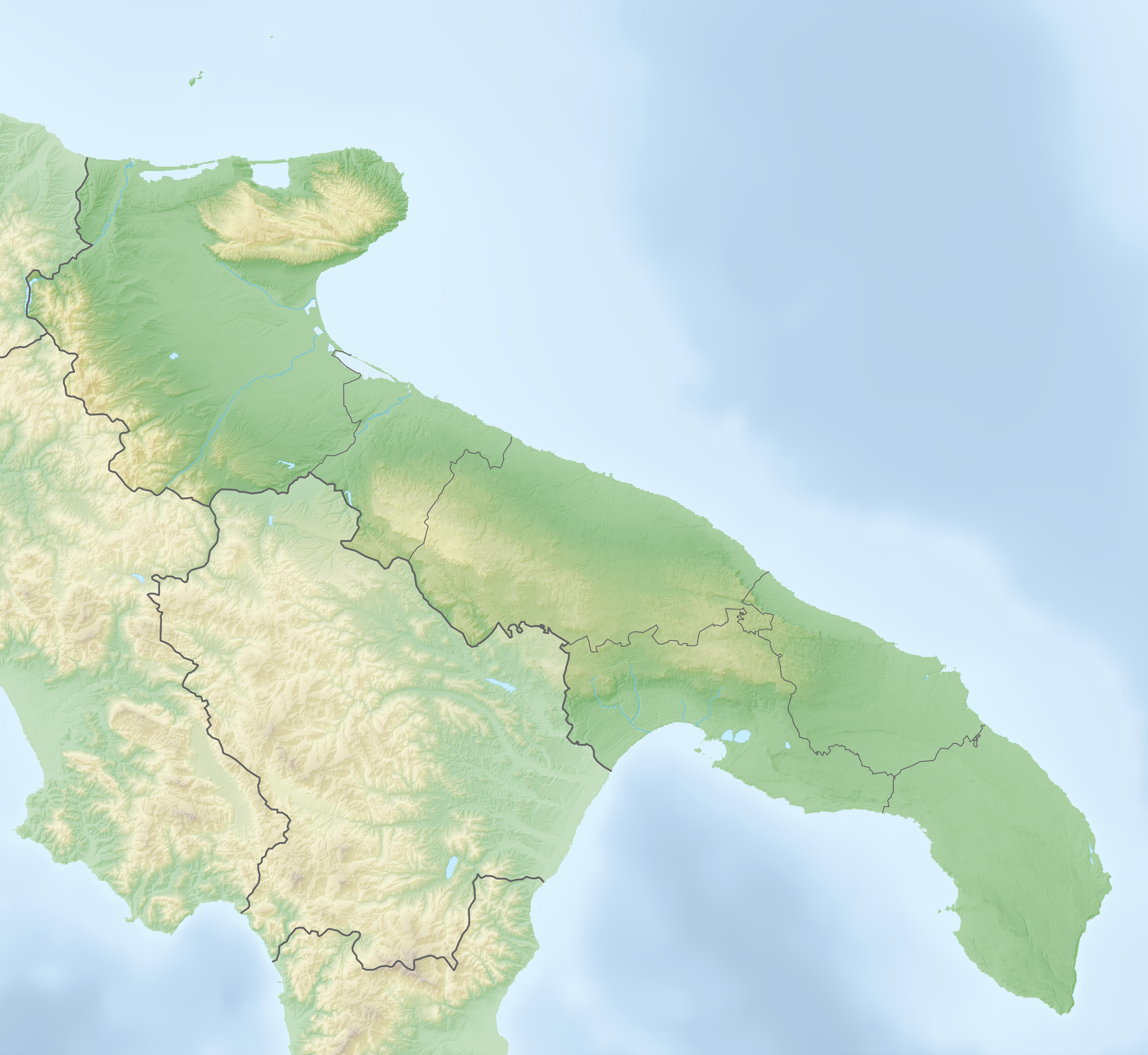
- Location within Apulia
- Location: Province of Foggia (Apulia), Province of Campobasso (Molise)
- Coordinates: 41.58°N 14.945°E
- Type: artificial
- Primary inflows: Fortore
- Primary outflows: Fortore
- Basin countries: Italy
- Max. length: 12 km (7.5 mi)
- Surface area: 13 km^{2} (5.0 sq mi)
- Water volume: 250,000,000 m^{3} (8.8×10^{9} cu ft)

Lago di Occhito is a lake in the Province of Foggia (Apulia) and Province of Campobasso (Molise) in the south of Italy. Its surface area is 13 km^{2} (5.0 sq mi). The lake serves as a part of the border between Apulia and Molise. Lago di Occhito is a large artificial lake, created with a dam on the Fortore. It is approximately 12 km long and half belongs to the province of Campobasso and the remaining part to the province of Foggia. The municipalities overlooking the lake are Sant'Elia a Pianisi, Macchia Valfortore, Pietracatella, Gambatesa, Tufara, Carlantino, Celenza Valfortore and, San Marco la Catola.

== Creation and Occhito Dam ==
The lake was created with a dam on the Fortore river, which partly flooded the Fortore Valley, causing the creation of Lago Di Occhito. The dam has a capacity 210 million m³ of water.

== Gallery ==
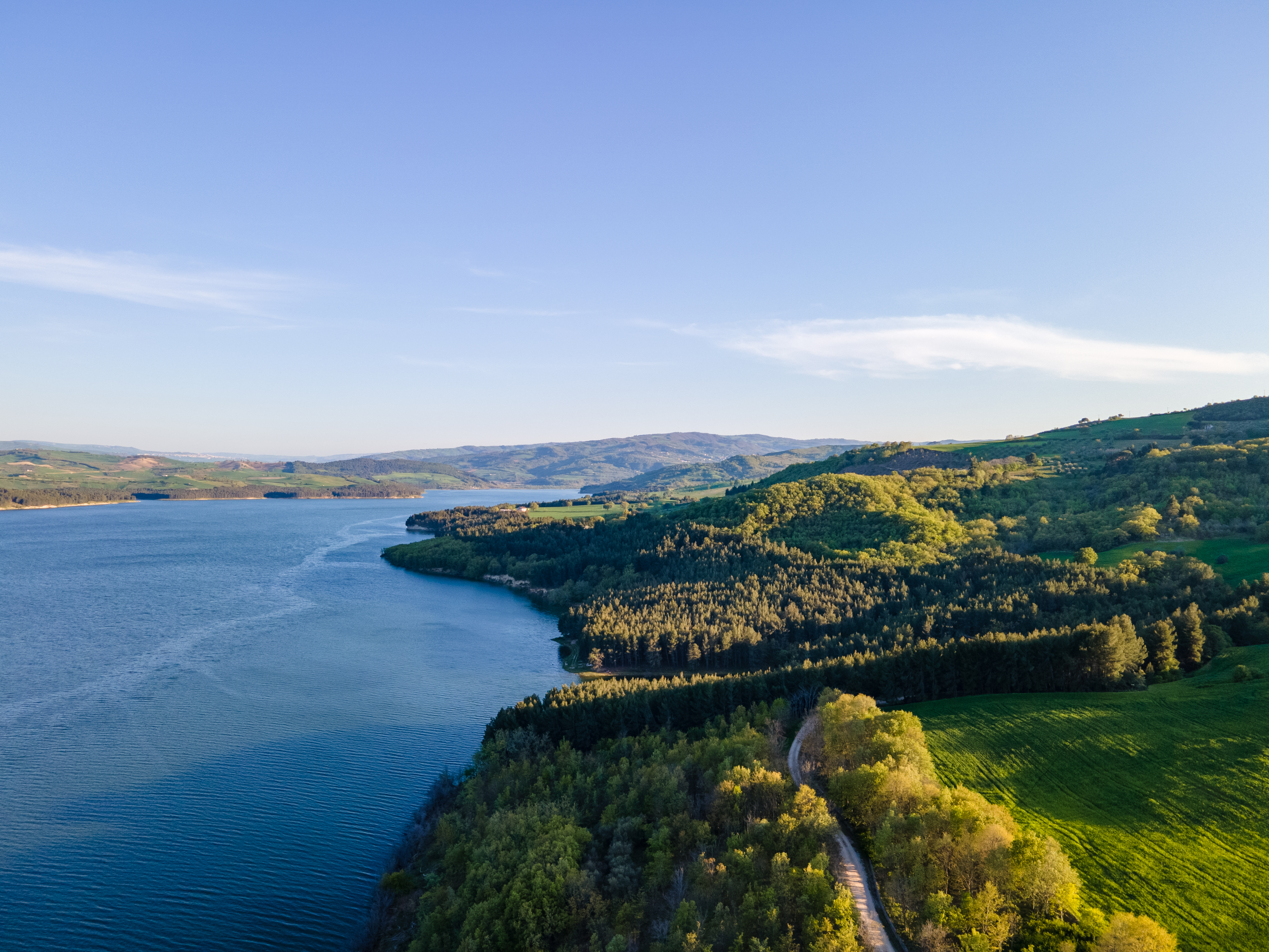

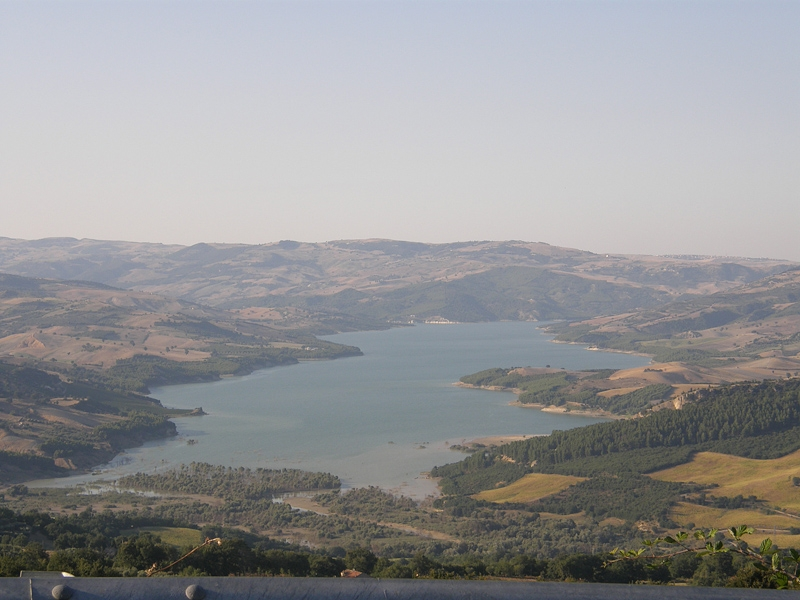

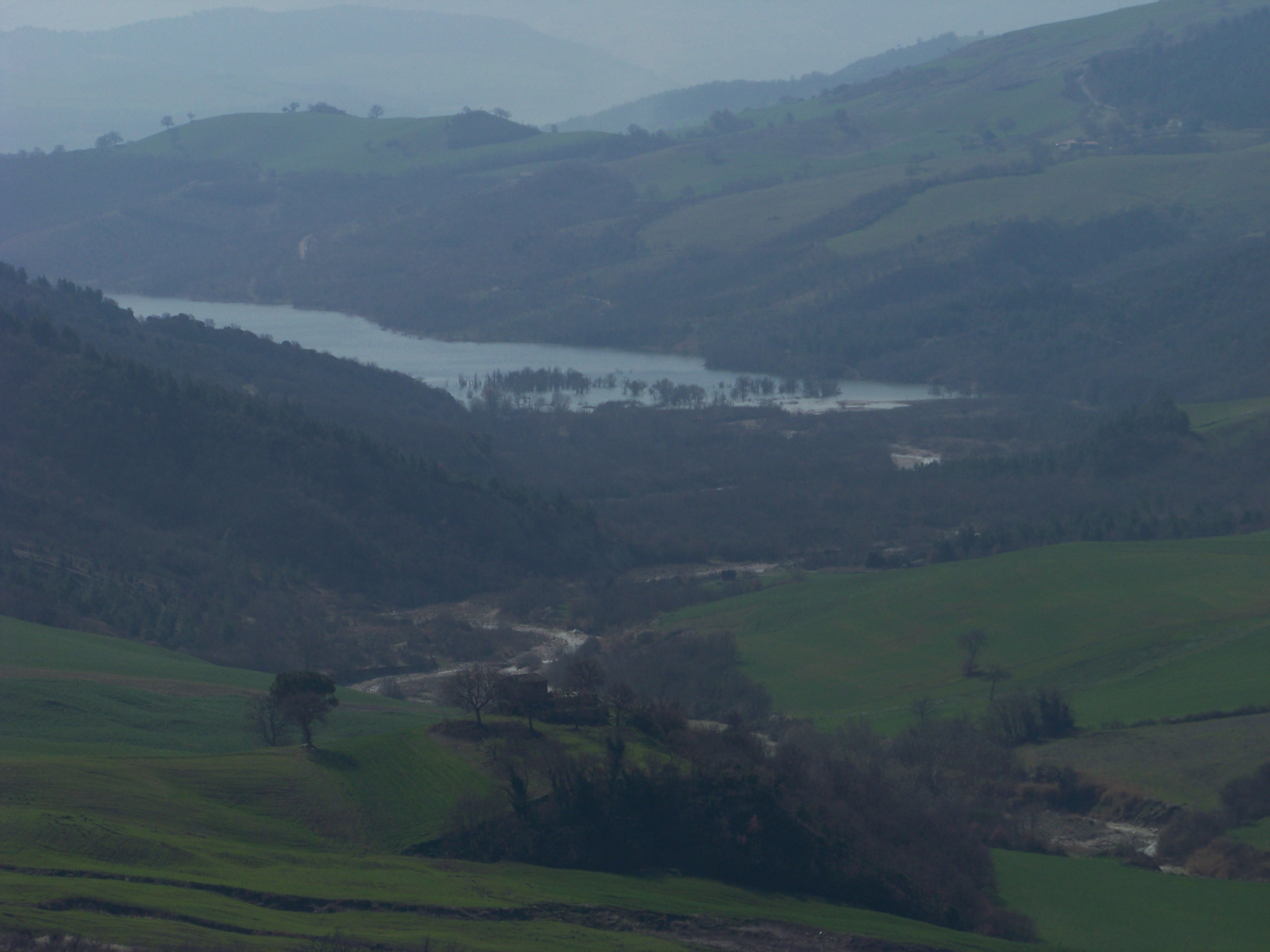

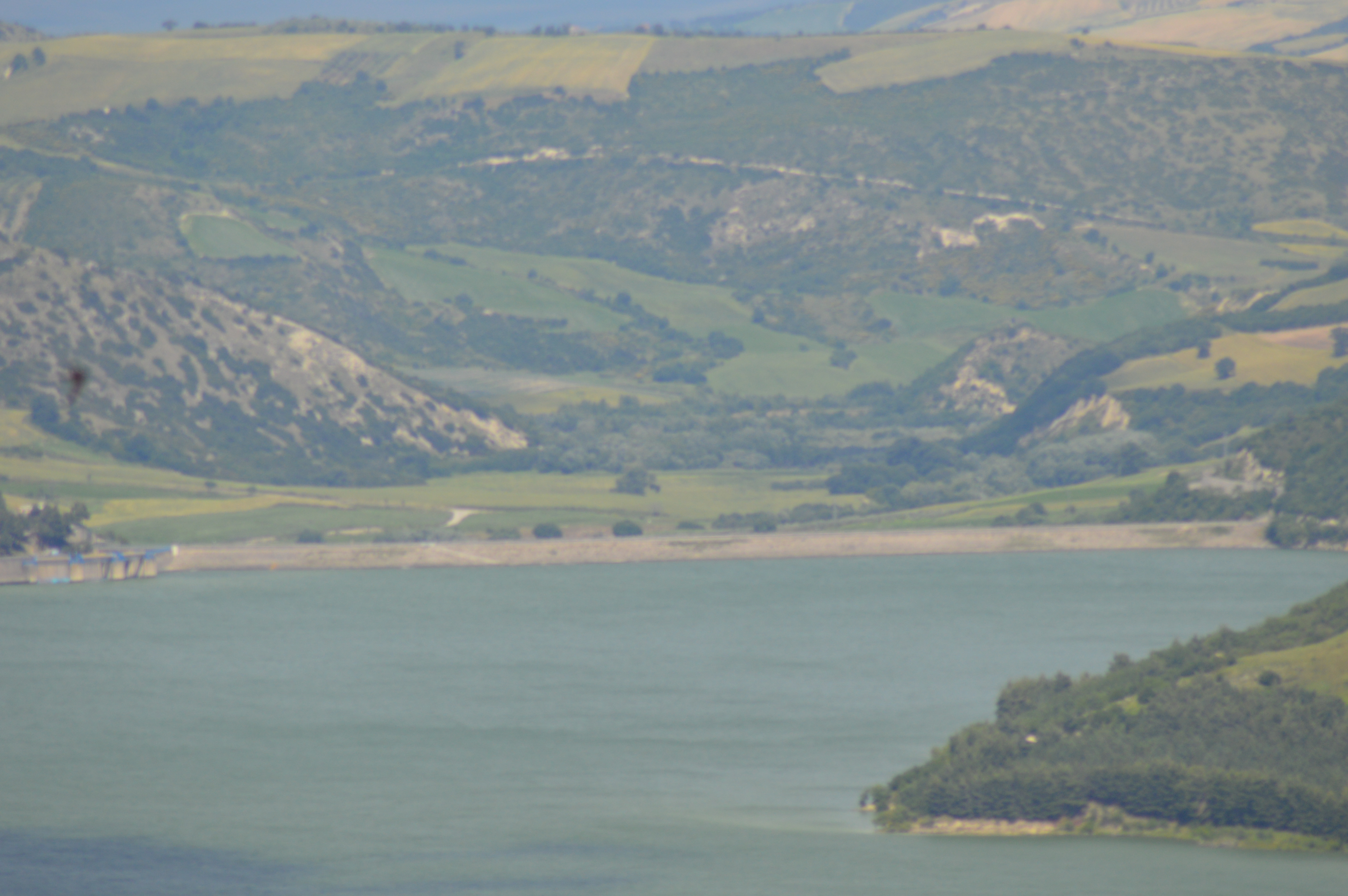

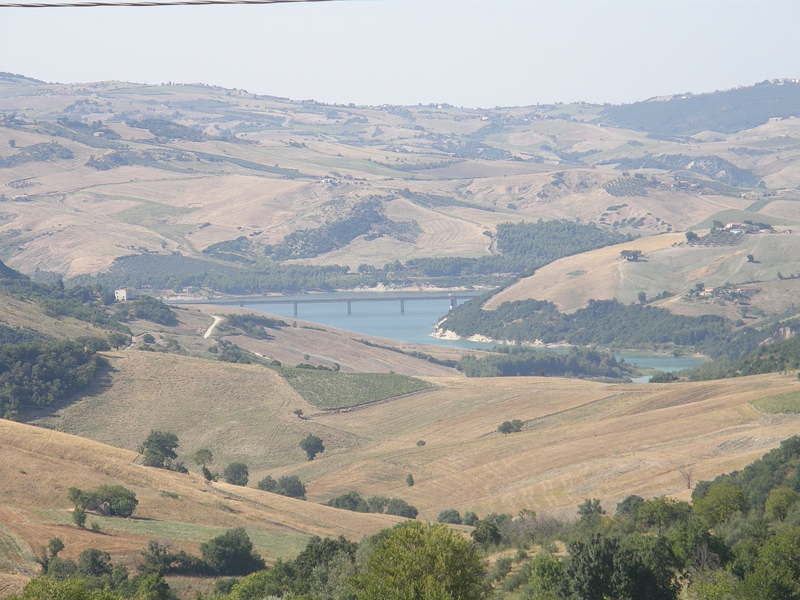

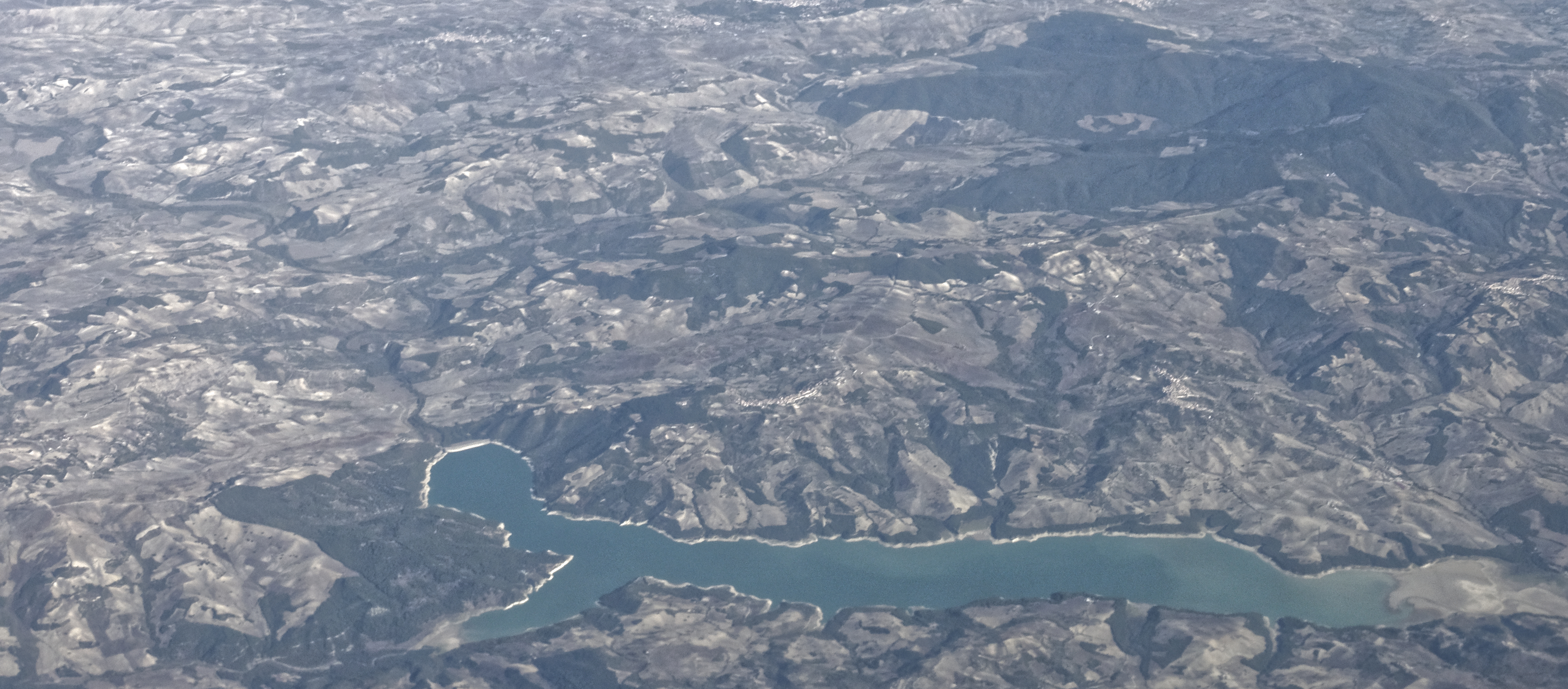

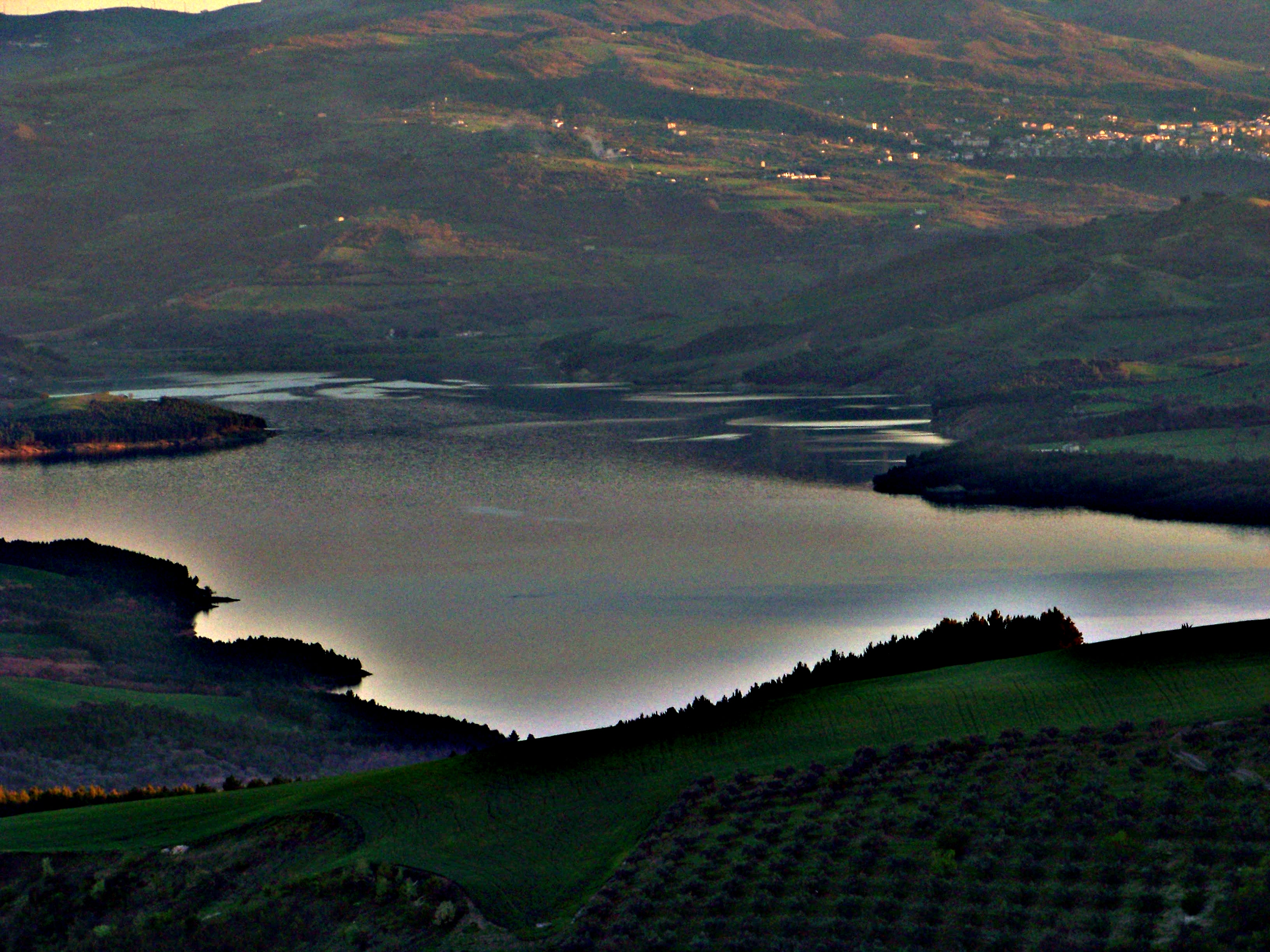

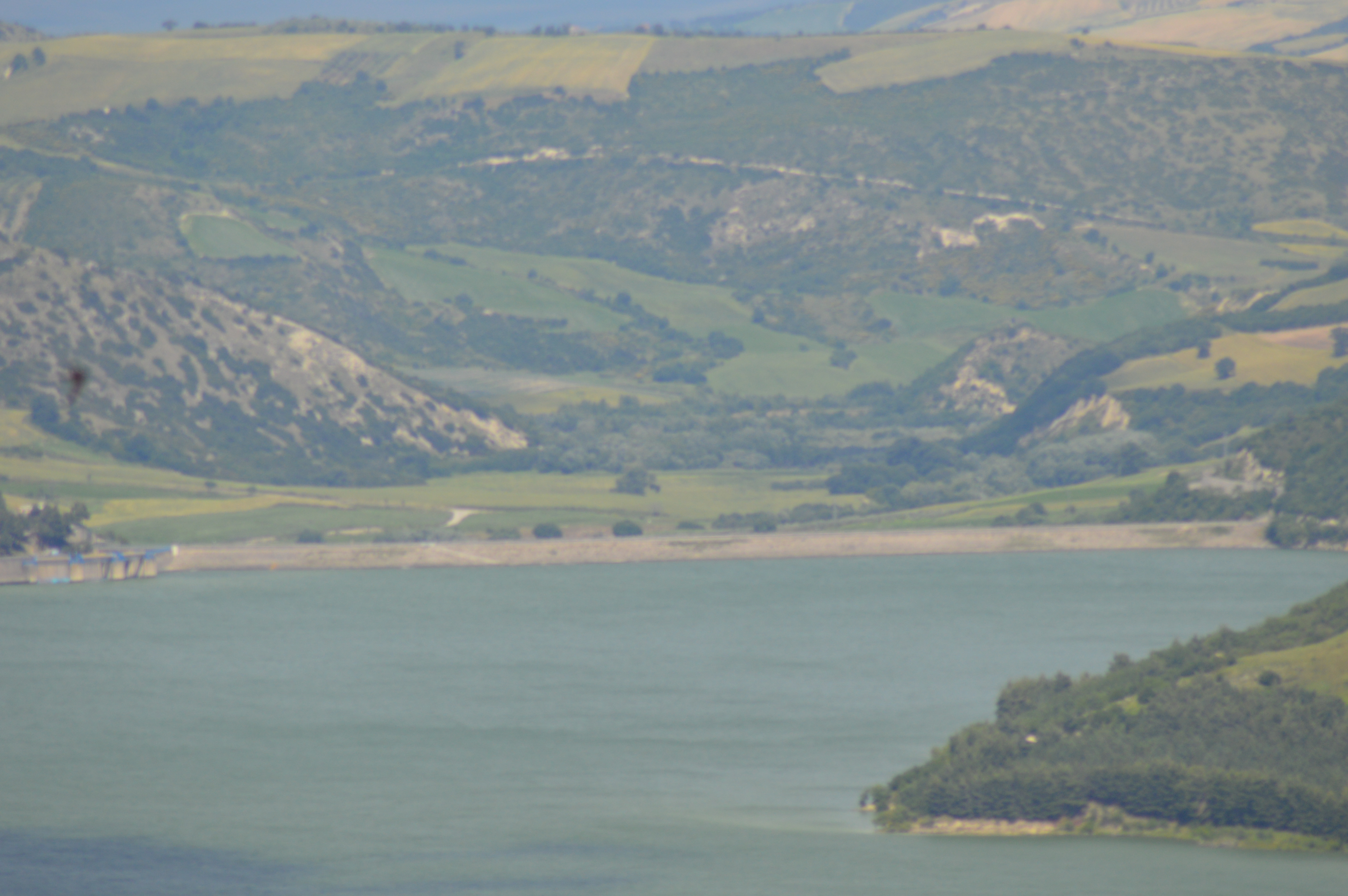
