= San Giovanni in Galdo =

- Comune
- Comune di San Giovanni in Galdo
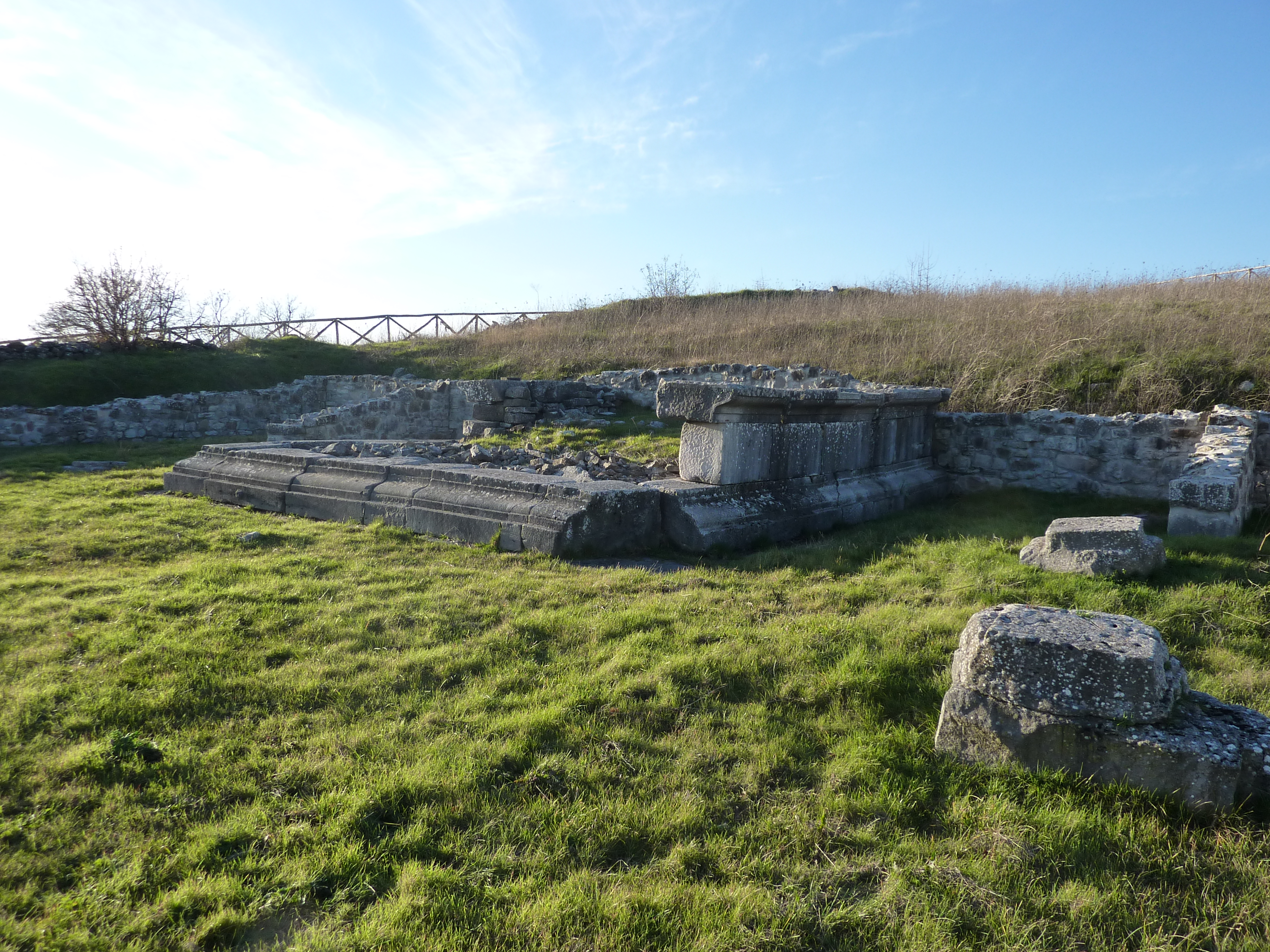
- Italic temple.

- Coat of arms

- Location within Italy Location within Molise
- Coordinates: 41°35′N 14°45′E
- Country: Italy
- Region: Molise
- Province: Campobasso (CB)

Government
  - Mayor: Mario Piunno

Area
  - Total: 19.4 km^{2} (7.5 sq mi)
- Elevation: 552 m (1,811 ft)

Population (30 November 2017)
  - Total: 555
  - Density: 28.6/km^{2} (74.1/sq mi)
- Demonym: Sangiovannari
- Time zone: UTC+1 (CET)
  - Summer (DST): UTC+2 (CEST)
- Postal code: 86010
- Dialing code: 0874
- Website: Official website

San Giovanni in Galdo is a comune (municipality) in the Province of Campobasso in the Italian region of Molise, located about 7 kilometres (4 mi) east of Campobasso.

San Giovanni in Galdo borders the following municipalities: Campobasso, Campodipietra, Campolieto, Matrice, Monacilioni, Toro. San Giovanni in Galdo is home to many families that emigrated to America in the early 1900s. Families with the surnames of DiCesare, Trotta, DeMaioribus, Marino, Ramacciato, Santone Di'Orio and Timperio.

== Main sights ==
San Giovanni in Galdo is the site of a Samnitic sanctuary atop Colle Rimontato (709 meters a.s.l.). Excavated between 1974 and 1976, the sanctuary took the form of a frontal Italic podium temple surrounded by a portico. The ritual activity at the sanctuary was confine to a limited area, likely indicating that the temple served a discrete, local population.
