= Giuseppe Puchetti =

Italian politician

President of the Province of Campobasso
- Incumbent
- Assumed office 5 November 2023
- Preceded by: Francesco Roberti

Mayor of Larino
- Incumbent
- Assumed office 11 June 2018
- Preceded by: Vincenzo Notarangelo

Personal details
- Born: 23 January 1969 (age 57) Termoli, Italy

Giuseppe Puchetti (born 23 January 1969) is an Italian politician who has served as president of the Province of Campobasso since 2023. He has also served as mayor of Larino since 2018.

== Life and career ==
Born in Termoli on 23 January 1969, Puchetti graduated from university and pursued a professional career as a teacher before entering politics.

In 1999, he was elected to the municipal council of Larino, and reconfirmed in 2003, when he was also appointed assessor. He was elected councillor again in 2008.

Puchetti was elected mayor of Larino in the 2018 local elections and was re-elected in 2023 as the candidate of the civic list "Siamo Larino".

On 5 November 2023, Puchetti was elected president of the Province of Campobasso by the electoral college of mayors and municipal councillors, succeeding Francesco Roberti. He received 55% of the vote, defeating challenger Orazio Civetta, mayor of Ripabottoni and incumbent acting president.
