= Raffaele of Sant'Elia a Pianisi =

Italian, Servant of God

Venerable Raffaele of Sant'Elia a Pianisi OFMCap
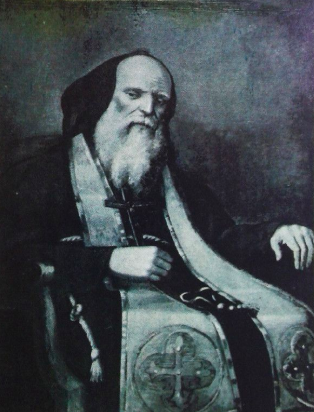
- Born: 14 December 1816; Sant'Elia a Pianisi, Molise, Italy
- Died: 6 January 1901 (aged 84); Sant'Elia a Pianisi, Molise, Italy
- Patronage: Franciscan Order of Friars Minor Capuchin

Raffaele of Sant'Elia a Pianisi (14 December 1816 – 6 January 1901), baptized as Domenico Petrucelli, commonly known as "Padre Raffaele", was an Italian Priest and a friar of the Order of Friars Minor Capuchin.

== Early life ==
Raffaele was born in Sant'Elia a Pianisi on December 14, 1816, to a peasant Italian Roman Catholic family; he was baptized the next day. Domenico was the seventh of ten children. His father was a farmer and, his mother was a housewife. He would work in the fields and care for his family's animals. His parents names were Salvatore Petruccelli and Brigida Mastrovita. He worked several different jobs before joining the Capuchins.

== Religious life ==
In 1834, he was admitted to the novitiate of the Capuchins in Morcone. During this time he was given the religious name Raffaele after Archangel Raffaele. In 1835, he made his vows. After his studies he was ordained a priest, on March 29, 1840, in Larino. From this time he spent time at various convents in Apulia and Molise. The most notable being in Morcone, Campobasso, and Sant'Elia a Pianisi. In September 1900, he was reassigned to the convent in Sant'Elia a Pianisi, where he died four months later.

=== Oppression ===
After the Unification of Italy, more secularist policies arouse, these policies were seen as discriminatory towards Capuchin friars and Catholics, prompting responses from local Catholics. Padre Raffaele lived under these policies, which took many of their assets away.

He died and was buried January 6, 1901, in Sant'Elia a Pianisi.

== Beatification process ==
Padre Raffaele was declared venerable by Pope Francis on 6 April, 2019, and two days later, Francis authorized the promulgation of the positio. Raffaele of Sant'Elia a Piani was declared venerable because of his heroic virtue.

In 1904, Pio visited the convent where Padre Raffaele died; he stated he felt the "aura" Padre Raffaele left. Pio of Pietrelcina spoke of and wrote about the good virtues of Padre Raffaele and thought of him to be a saintly model for the friars. Padre Raffaele is especially venerated in Sant'Elia a Pianisi; many homes have pictures of him, and a tarp of him is on the local Capuchin Convent. On April 26, 1936, his remains were exhumed and transferred to the convent church, where they are preserved and venerated. He was later exhumed for a second time in 2017.
