= List of presidents of the Province of Campobasso =

President of the Province of Campobasso
- Presidente della Provincia di Campobasso
- Incumbent; Giuseppe Puchetti since 5 November 2023
- Term length: 4 years
- Inaugural holder: Achille De Gaglia
- Formation: 1889

The president of the Province of Campobasso is the head of the provincial government in Campobasso, Molise, Italy. The president oversees the administration of the province, coordinates the activities of the municipalities, and represents the province in regional and national matters. Until 1970, the office was known as president of the Province of Molise.

Since November 2023, the office has been held by Giuseppe Puchetti, a centre-left independent.

== List ==
=== Presidents of the Provincial Deputation (1889–1928) ===
No.	Portrait	Name	Term start	Term end	Party
1		Achille De Gaglia	1889	1893	
2		Filomeno Zappone	1893	1906	
3		Michele Testa	1906	1911	
4		Angelo Del Lupo	1911	?	

=== Presidents of the Provincial Rectorate (1928–1943) ===
No.	Portrait	Name	Term start	Term end	Party
1		Pasquale Cimino	1928	1929	National Fascist Party
2		Michelangelo De Santis	1929	1930	National Fascist Party
—		Michele De Robertis (commissioner)	1931	1931	—
3		Guglielmo Josa	1931	1934	National Fascist Party
4		Mario Baranello	1934	1938	National Fascist Party
5		Domenico Trotta	1938	1943	National Fascist Party

=== Presidents of the Provincial Deputation (1943–1951) ===
No.	Portrait	Name	Term start	Term end	Party
1		Eugenio Grimaldi	1943	1951	

=== Presidents of the Province (1952–present) ===
No.	Portrait	Name	Term start	Term end	Party
1		Andrea Valletta	1952	1952	
2		Domenico Zampini	1952	1970	Christian Democracy
3		Eliseo Sciarretta	1970	1975	Christian Democracy
4		Bruno Manes Gravina	1975	1978	Christian Democracy
5		Vittorio Vincelli	1978	1980	Christian Democracy
6		Enzo Di Tempora	1980	1982	Christian Democracy
7		Antonio Sappracone	1982	1984	Christian Democracy
8		Nicolino De Rubertis	1984	1985	Italian Socialist Party
9		Antonio Macchiarola	1985	20 July 1987	Christian Democracy
10		Antonio Chieffo	20 July 1987	21 March 1990	Christian Democracy
10		Antonio Chieffo	6 August 1990	8 May 1995	Christian Democracy
10		Antonio Chieffo	8 May 1995	23 November 2001	Italian People's Party
—		Pasquale Piccoli (acting)	23 November 2001	11 June 2002	Independent (centre-left)
11		Augusto Massa	11 June 2002	24 February 2006	Democratic Party of the Left
12		Nicola D'Ascanio	30 May 2006	26 May 2011	Democratic Party of the Left (2006–2007); Democratic Party (2007–2011)
13		Rosario De Matteis	26 May 2011	1 September 2016	The People of Freedom (2011–2013); Forza Italia (2013–2016)
14		Antonio Battista	1 September 2016	11 June 2019	Democratic Party
—		Simona Contucci (acting)	11 June 2019	3 September 2019	Democratic Party
15		Francesco Roberti	3 September 2019	7 August 2023	Forza Italia
—		Orazio Civetta (acting)	7 August 2023	5 November 2023	Independent (centre-right)
16		Giuseppe Puchetti	5 November 2023	Incumbent	Independent (centre-left)

== Sources ==
- Menichini, Piera (2005). "I presidenti delle Province dall'Unità alla Grande guerra: repertorio analitico". Storia Amministrazione Costituzione (13): 236–237.
- Missori, Mario (1989). Governi, alte cariche dello Stato, alti magistrati e prefetti del Regno d'Italia. Vol. 2. Rome: Ministero per i beni culturali e ambientali – Ufficio centrale per i beni archivistici. pp. 553–555.
- "Presidenti della Provincia di Campobasso". Province of Campobasso.
