= Province of Campobasso =

Province of Italy

Coordinates: 41°34′N 14°40′E

Province of Campobasso Provincia di Campobasso (Italian) Pruìnge de Cambuàsce (Neapolitan)
- Province
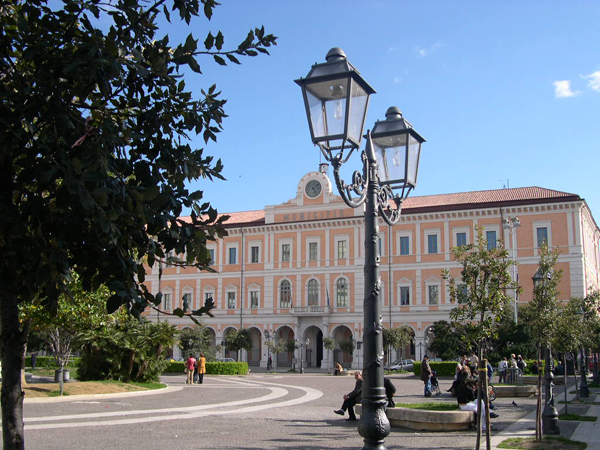

- Flag Coat of arms

- Location of the province of Campobasso in Italy
- Country: Italy
- Region: Molise
- Capital(s): Campobasso
- Municipalities: 84

Government
  - President: Giuseppe Puchetti

Area
  - Total: 2,925.41 km^{2} (1,129.51 sq mi)

Population (2026)
  - Total: 207,723
  - Density: 71.0065/km^{2} (183.906/sq mi)

GDP
  - Total: €4.372 billion (2015)
  - Per capita: €19,339 (2015)
- Time zone: UTC+1 (CET)
  - Summer (DST): UTC+2 (CEST)
- Postal code: 86100, 86010-86049
- Telephone prefix: 0874, 0875
- Vehicle registration: CB
- ISTAT code: 070

The Province of Campobasso (Italian: provincia di Campobasso; Molisan dialect: pruìnge de Cambuàsce) is a province in the region of Molise in southern Italy. Its capital is the city of Campobasso. It has a population of 207,723 in an area of 2,925.41 square kilometres (1,129.51 sq mi) across its 84 municipalities.

The eastern part of the province is home to a small Croatian minority who speak an archaic dialect of Croatian. The Croatians reside primarily in Acquaviva Collecroce, San Felice and Montemitro.

== History ==
The Samnites, a group of Sabellic tribes, dominated this region of Italy, including Campania, from around 600 BC to 290 BC. Following the war against Rome in 343 BC, in 290 BC the territory of the ancient Samnium region (the central zone of which lies in the current province of Campobasso) was included in the Roman Regio IV Samnium. In 570, following an invasion by the Lombards, the territory was annexed to the Lombard duchy of Benevento, resulting in a reduction of the estates and assets of the ecclesiastical bishoprics of Bojano, Saepinum, Venafro, Trivento, Isernia, Larino and Termoli. As a result of frequent changes in its ownership, the Lombards called the city Campus Vassorum ("Vassals' Territory"), which later became Campobasso. The feudal lords increasingly gained power at the expense of the church. The principality of Capua, established in 860, included the counties of Venafro, Larino, Trivento, Bojano, Isernia, Campomarino and Termoli. Hugues I de Molise, Earl of Bojano and Norman feudal lord of Mulhouse (from which derives the name of Molise), implemented a policy to restore the old boundaries to the territories of Sannio in 1053, and finally, thanks to his successor, Hugues II de Molise, Molise was created independently around 1128.

With the advent of the Neapolitan Republic, a new administrative organization was established, divided into departments made up of cantons. The Department of the Sangro was divided into 16 cantons: Lanciano, Ortona, Palena, Atessa, Pescocostanzo, Castel di Sangro, Agnone, Baranello, Campobasso, La Riccia, Trivento, Larino, Termoli, Serra Capriola, Dragonara, and Vasto. On 27 September 1806, after the French occupation, Molise became an autonomous province consisting of the districts of Campobasso and Isernia, to which the districts of Larino and Agnone were added. During the period of Fascist Italy, several fascist internment camps were administered and operated in the province from 1940-1943. These include fascist internment camps in Agnone, Bojano, Casacalenda, Isernia (then part of the province), and Vinchiaturo. Following a constitutional amendment in December 1963 the province of Campobasso was detached from Abruzzo, given the status of Region, and renamed Molise. The situation remained unchanged until 1970 when 52 municipalities were detached to form the province of Isernia, established under Law No. 2 of February 1970.

== Geography ==
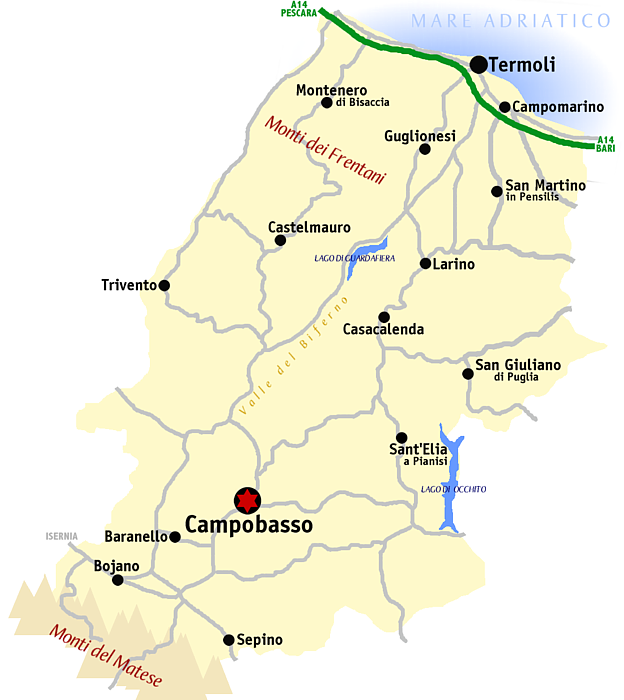
Map of the province of Campobasso

The province of Campobasso is situated in eastern Italy on the Adriatic coast. It is bordered to the north by the province of Chieti in Abruzzo, to the south-east by the province of Foggia in Apulia, to the south by the province of Benevento and the province of Caserta in Campania, and to the west by the Province of Isernia. The terrain is varied extending from the mountainous Apennines, down through hills, lakes and inland rivers to the Adriatic coast. The territory is crossed by the river valleys of the Trigno (85 km), Biferno (84 km) and Fortore (110 km), flanked by hills and mountains. Other rivers of note include the Tammaro (78 km), the Saccione (33 km), the Sinarca (26 km), and the Sassinora (7 km). All flow into the Adriatic with the exception of the Tammaro. The central Valle del Biferno includes the 7.45 km^{2} (2.88 sq mi) Lago di Guardialfiera, to the east of Castelmauro. The other lake of note is Lago di Occhito to the south east of Sant'Elia a Pianisi. The provincial capital of Campobasso lies in the south of the province, north of the Matese mountains, one of the three main mountain ranges in the Molise region. On the coast, the principal towns are Termoli and Campomarino.

== Government ==
=== Municipalities ===
The province has 84 municipalities:

- Acquaviva Collecroce
- Baranello
- Bojano
- Bonefro
- Busso
- Campobasso
- Campochiaro
- Campodipietra
- Campolieto
- Campomarino
- Casacalenda
- Casalciprano
- Castelbottaccio
- Castellino del Biferno
- Castelmauro
- Castropignano
- Cercemaggiore
- Cercepiccola
- Civitacampomarano
- Colle d'Anchise
- Colletorto
- Duronia
- Ferrazzano
- Fossalto
- Gambatesa
- Gildone
- Guardialfiera
- Guardiaregia
- Guglionesi
- Jelsi
- Larino
- Limosano
- Lucito
- Lupara
- Macchia Valfortore
- Mafalda
- Matrice
- Mirabello Sannitico
- Molise
- Monacilioni
- Montagano
- Montecilfone
- Montefalcone nel Sannio
- Montelongo
- Montemitro
- Montenero di Bisaccia
- Montorio nei Frentani
- Morrone del Sannio
- Oratino
- Palata
- Petacciato
- Petrella Tifernina
- Pietracatella
- Pietracupa
- Portocannone
- Provvidenti
- Riccia
- Ripabottoni
- Ripalimosani
- Roccavivara
- Rotello
- Salcito
- San Biase
- San Felice del Molise
- San Giacomo degli Schiavoni
- San Giovanni in Galdo
- San Giuliano del Sannio
- San Giuliano di Puglia
- San Martino in Pensilis
- San Massimo
- San Polo Matese
- Sant'Angelo Limosano
- Sant'Elia a Pianisi
- Santa Croce di Magliano
- Sepino
- Spinete
- Tavenna
- Termoli
- Torella del Sannio
- Toro
- Trivento
- Tufara
- Ururi
- Vinchiaturo

== Demographics ==
As of 2026, the population is 207,723, of which 49.6% are male, and 50.4% are female. Minors make up 12.8% of the population, and seniors make up 27.6%.

Historical population

Year	Pop.	±%
1861	229,393	—
1871	240,631	+4.9%
1881	251,316	+4.4%
1901	262,429	+4.4%
1911	265,166	+1.0%
1921	253,573	−4.4%
1931	260,757	+2.8%
1936	270,964	+3.9%

Year	Pop.	±%
1951	289,577	+6.9%
1961	252,251	−12.9%
1971	227,641	−9.8%
1981	235,847	+3.6%
1991	238,958	+1.3%
2001	230,749	−3.4%
2011	226,419	−1.9%
2021	211,586	−6.6%

Source: ISTAT

=== Immigration ===
As of 2025, immigrants make up 9.6% of the population. The 5 largest foreign countries of birth are Argentina, Romania, Germany, Switzerland, and Morocco.

== Landmarks and attractions ==
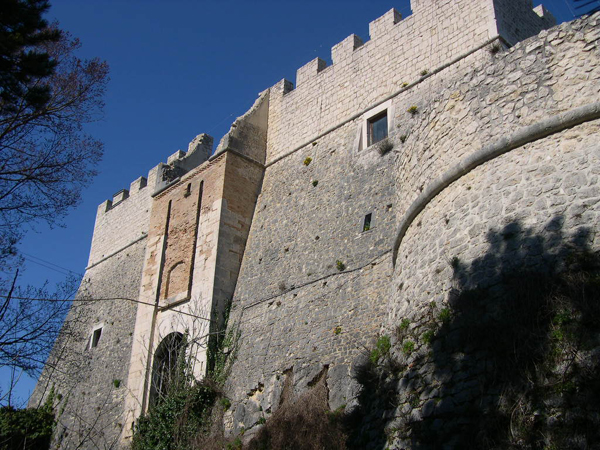
Manforte Castle

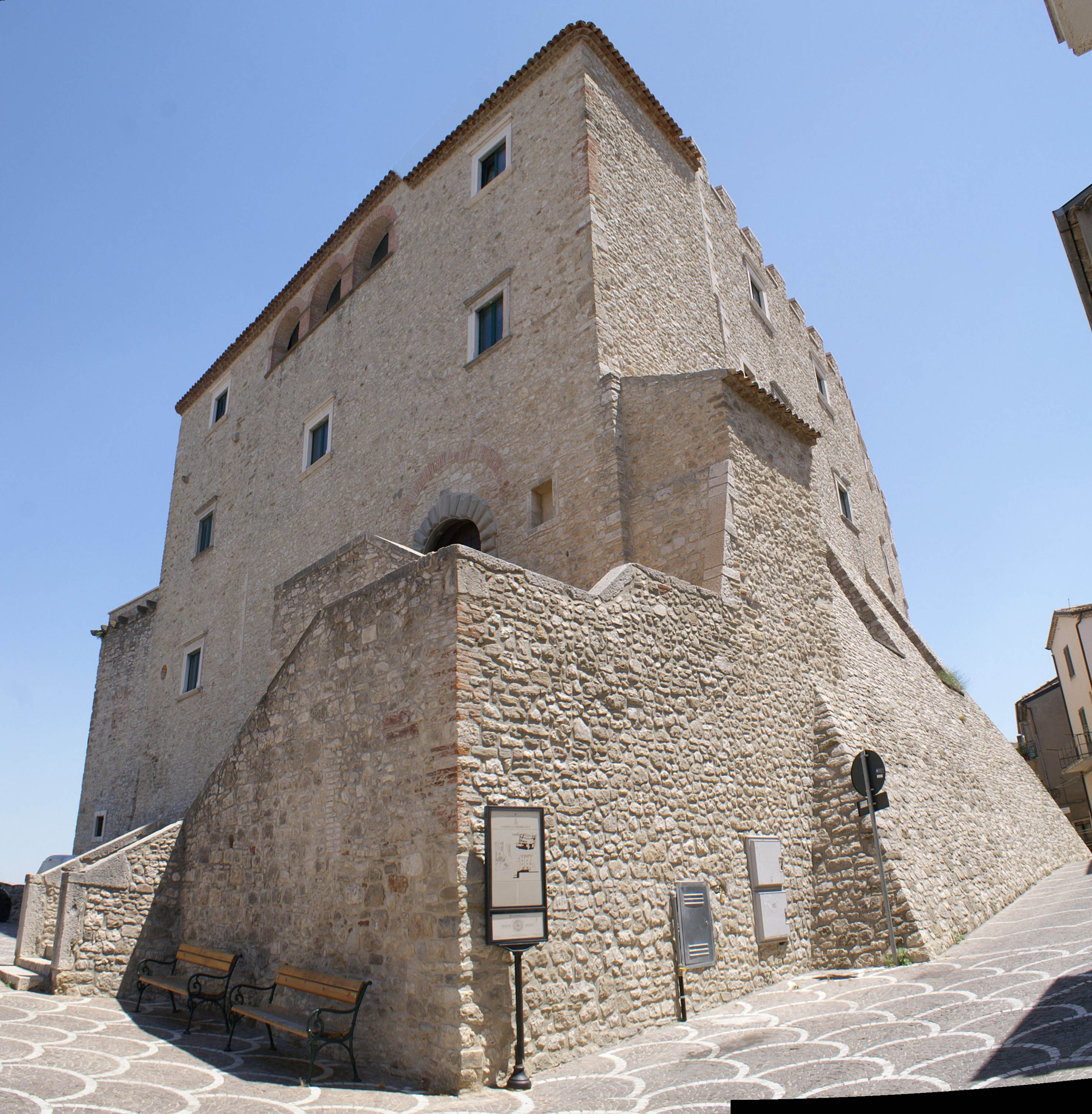
Gambatesa Castle

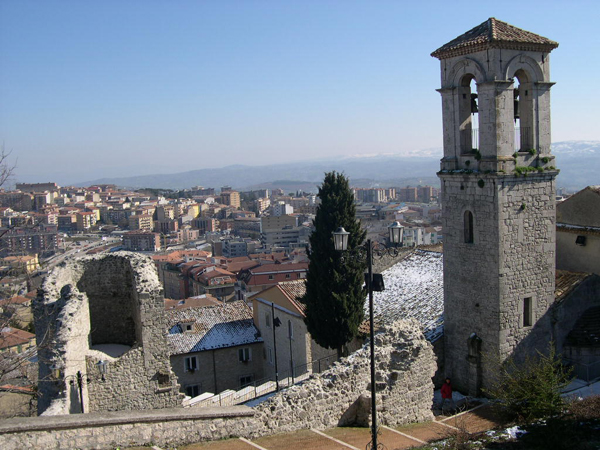
Bell tower of San Bartolomeo, Campobasso

Fishing trabucco at Termoli

The city of Campobasso has several landmarks including Manforte Castle (1450), the cathedral and several old churches including San Bartolomeo, Campomarino, Larino (inhabited since the 5th century BC) and the fortifications of Monte Vairano, Gildone, Duronia and Terravecchia di Sepino, the Roman city of Saepinum, with its forum, basilica, baths and theatre.

There are many large castles in the area, including those at Gambatesa, Castropignano, Civitacampomarano and Termoli, while there are many religious buildings of note such as Trivento Cathedral, Larino Cathedral (1319) and the 12th century Church of Santa Maria in Petacciato.

The town of Termoli is a regional seaside resort on the Adriatic sea.

== See also ==
- Molise Croats

== Bibliography ==
- Domenico, Roy Palmer (2002). The Regions of Italy: A Reference Guide to History and Culture. Greenwood Publishing Group. ISBN 978-0-313-30733-1.
- Touring club italiano (1979). Abruzzo, Molise. Touring Editore. ISBN 978-88-365-0017-8.
