= Gambatesa =

- Comune
- Comune di Gambatesa
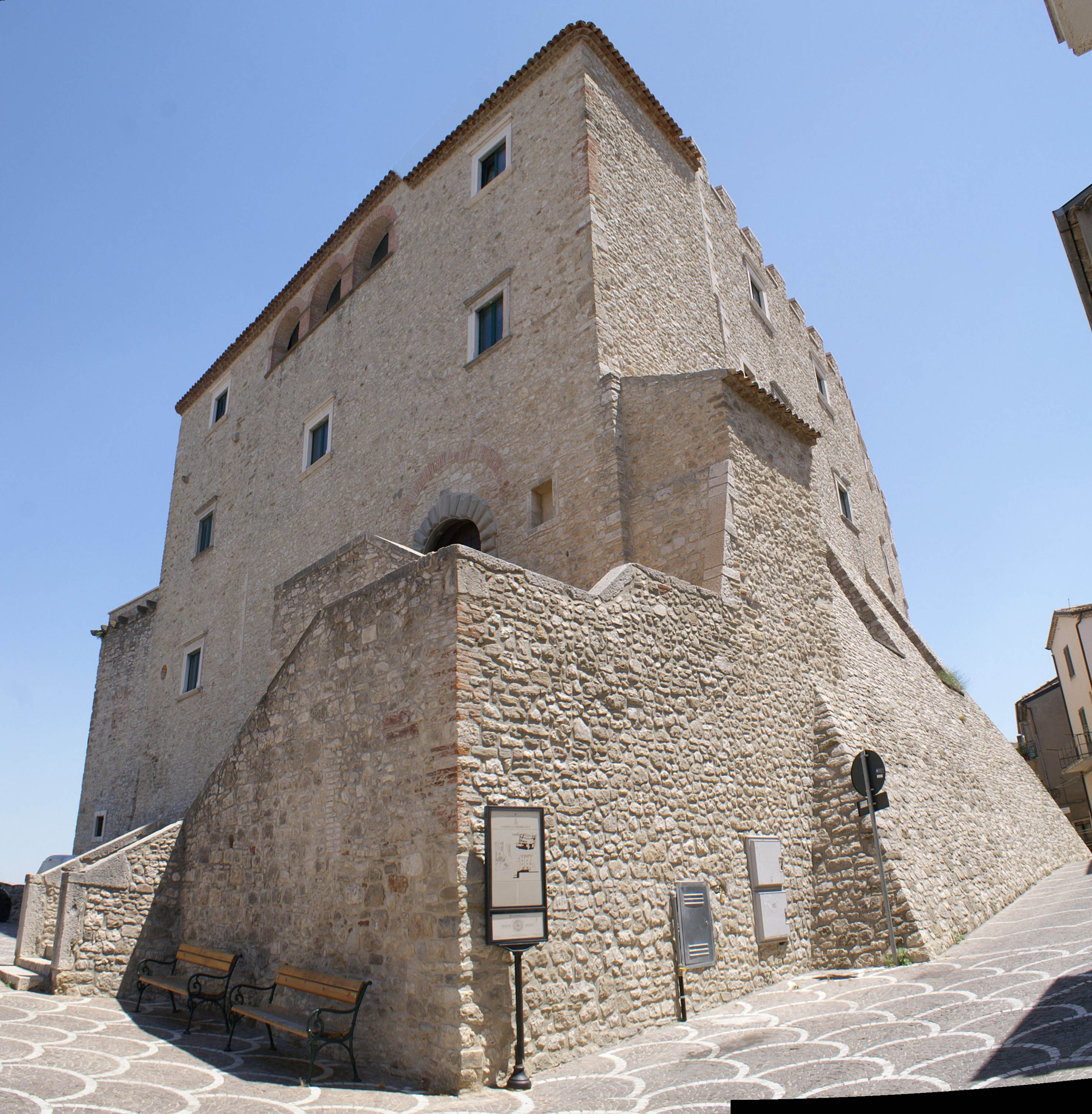
- Capuan Castle.

- Location within Italy Location within Molise
- Coordinates: 41°30′N 14°55′E
- Country: Italy
- Region: Molise
- Province: Campobasso (CB)

Government
  - Mayor: Carmelina Genovese

Area
  - Total: 43.69 km^{2} (16.87 sq mi)
- Elevation: 468 m (1,535 ft)

Population (30 November 2017)
  - Total: 1,437
  - Density: 32.89/km^{2} (85.19/sq mi)
- Demonym: Gambatesani
- Time zone: UTC+1 (CET)
  - Summer (DST): UTC+2 (CEST)
- Postal code: 86013
- Dialing code: 0874
- Patron saint: Bartholomew
- Saint day: 24 August
- Website: Official website

Gambatesa is a comune (municipality) in the Province of Campobasso in the Italian region Molise, located about 20 kilometres (12 mi) southeast of Campobasso.

Gambatesa borders the following municipalities: Celenza Valfortore, Macchia Valfortore, Pietracatella, Riccia, Tufara.
