= Saepinum =

Samnite town and Roman municipium

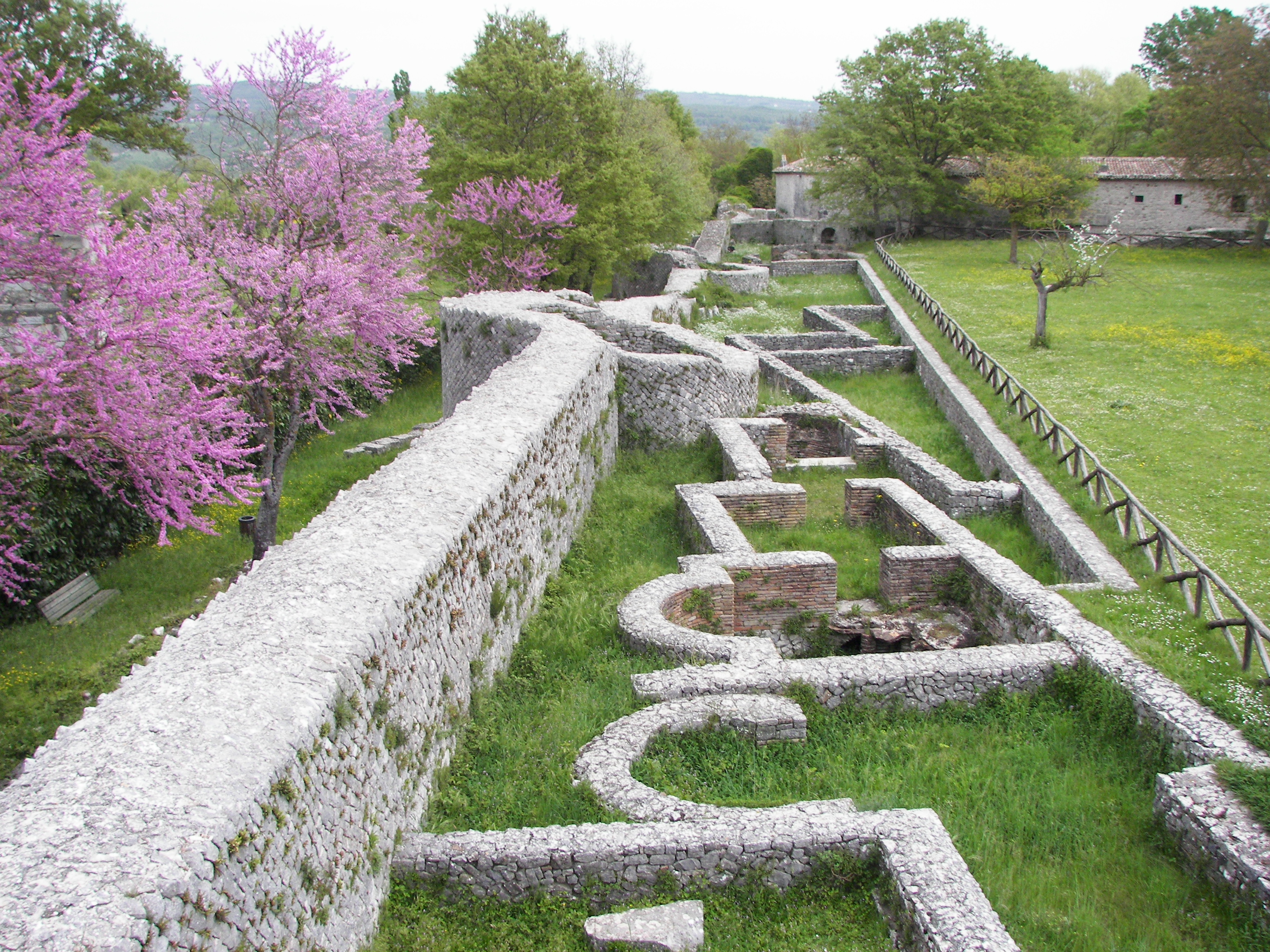
- Walls and baths

- Location within Italy
- 41°26′0″N 14°37′0″E
- Type: Settlement
- Periods: Roman Republic - Byzantine Empire
- Cultures: Ancient Rome
- Location: Sepino, Province of Campobasso, Molise, Italy

Site notes
- Condition: Ruined
- Owner: Public
- Management: Soprintendenza per i Beni Archeologici del Molise
- Public access: Yes
- Website: Sito Archeologico di Sepino (in Italian)

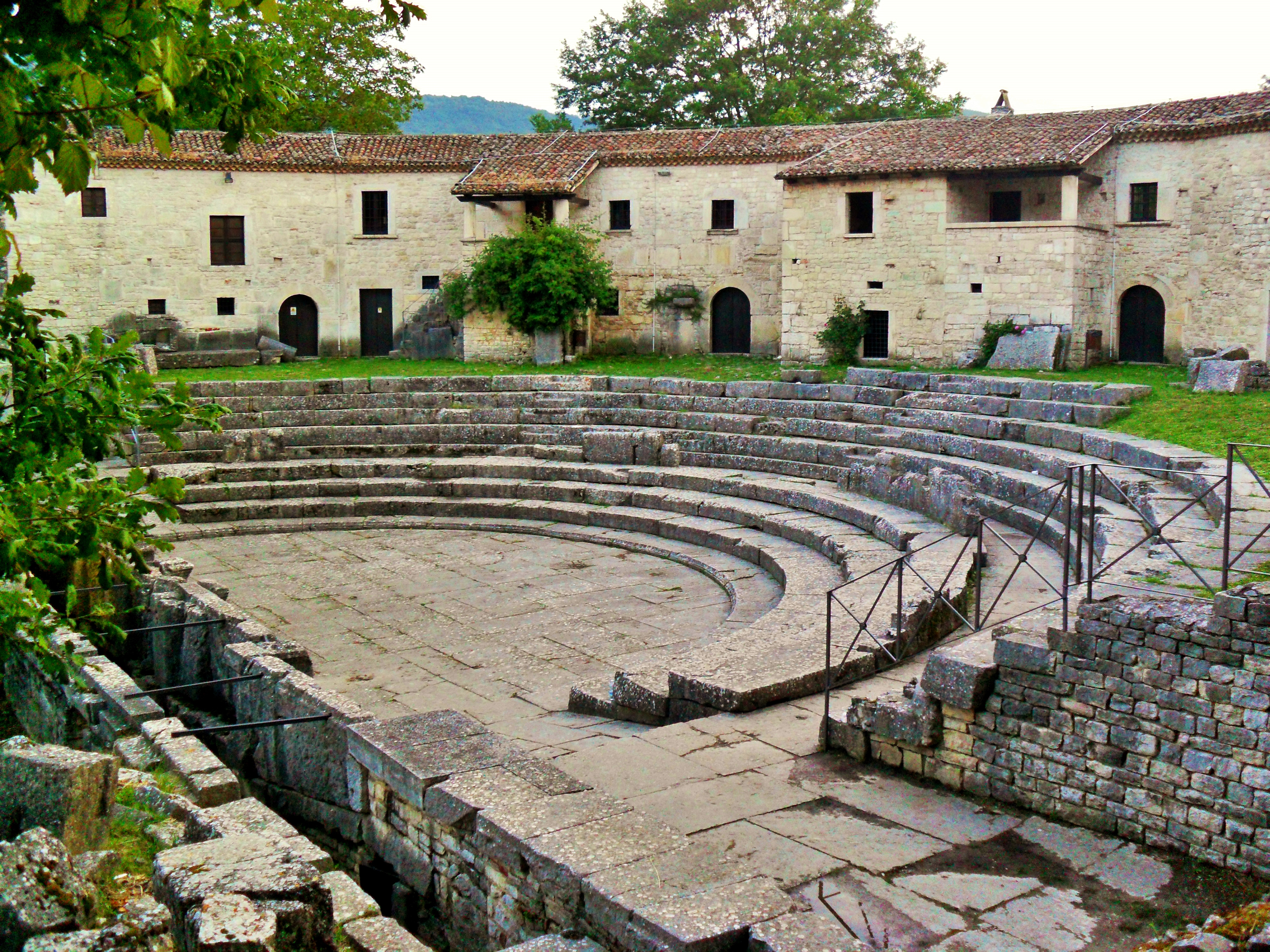
Theatre

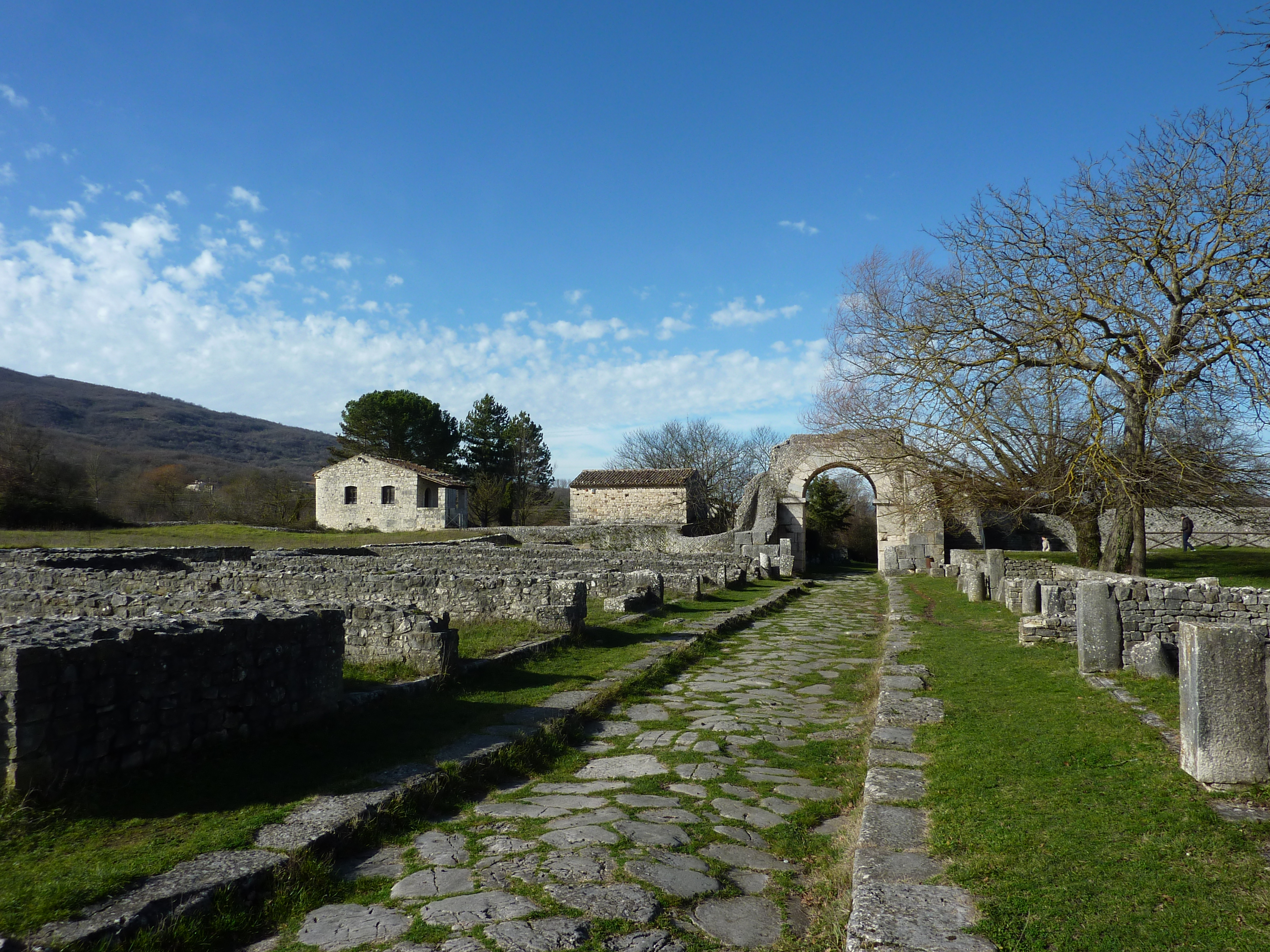
Porta Bojano

Saepinum (modern Altilia, near Sepino) was a Samnite town that later became a Roman municipium. Located approximately 15 kilometres (9.3 mi) south of the modern city of Campobasso in south-central Italy, Saepinum lay on the ancient road connecting Beneventum (modern Benevento) to Corfinium (modern Corfinio).

It has been partially excavated and remains of many well-preserved buildings can be seen.

More recent excavations from 2023 have revealed much more about the urban centre, and in particular an exceptional domus with a monumental entrance onto decumanus maximus.

== History ==
The original town of Saepinum was located on a mountain far above the Roman town, with remnants of its Cyclopean masonry walls still visible. Captured by the Romans in 293 BC, the Roman town's walls constructed in opus reticulatum were erected by Tiberius before he became emperor, dating to between 2 BC and 4 AD, as indicated by an inscription.

Within the city walls, there are remains of a theatre and other buildings, including temples of Jupiter and Apollo. There still exists, by the gate leading to Bovianum, an important inscription of about 168 AD, relating to the tratture (see Apulia) in Roman days, forbidding the natives to harm the shepherds who passed along them.

Tombs from the 4th century found within the city walls indicate that Saepinum was largely abandoned by that time. Following the collapse of the Western Roman Empire, Saepinum was taken in 882 by Saracens.

== Archaeology ==
The archaeological area of Saepinum of approximately 12 hectares is surrounded by a wall in which four monumental gates open, located at the entrance to the two main road arteries, each flanked by two circular towers. The layout of the walls and the orientation of the gates are dictated by the layout of the pre-existing main road system of the site, which then formed the cardo and the decumanus.

=== City wall ===
The walls are well preserved. The gates were monumental arches that celebrated Roman power and urban order, marking the passage into the city.

The walls are made up of a sequence of curtains, always rigidly rectilinear and of variable length, interrupted by circular towers arranged at a distance of 80 – 120 feet from each other.

Currently only part of the wall is exposed. Over the years, steps have been taken to restore and consolidate the structures brought to light, restoring some sections of elevation through the reuse of ancient collapsed material. In the sections not affected by the excavation, the route is marked by scattered cement cores and short sections of masonry. Overall, the city wall appears to be an accurate work of good military engineering. The material used is Matese limestone, cut into small blocks and shaped into the shape of small pyramids, with an undifferentiated, square or rectangular base. The facing of the curtains has a uniform thickness (approximately 1.80 m) and is woven with the reticulate technique, with a homogeneous cement mortar. The masonry is solid, with a height of approximately m. 4.80 and has a patrol path at the top. The quality of the weaving appears uniform and constant, and suggests a single construction phase.

The city wall is equipped with a system of circular towers, of which only nineteen towers remain visible, brought to light during the excavation campaign of the years 1950–1955. They protrude for about three meters both outside, towards the countryside, and inside, towards the city. The thickness of the external walls is greater than the internal one. They all have a diameter of approximately seven meters and a height of almost eleven, with an external facing in opus reticulatum. The structure of the towers is solidly interlocked with that of the curtains, and this demonstrates the contextual nature of the construction of the walls and towers. Three small slits, distributed on the external surface of the tower, guaranteed the defensive coverage of the area in front of the walls, three small windows were open on the internal side to control the urban area. Currently, only the basic structures remain of some towers, covered with ancient material mixed with backfill, of others, especially on the north-west side, part of the elevation has been rebuilt, recovering the ancient materials, and has been consolidated structure.

=== Gates ===
The four gates that open at the junction of the two main road arteries, the cardo and the decumanus, conventionally take their name from their orientation; they repeat the same planimetric scheme in the layout, the classic one of the city gate with a single round arch, approximately 4.8 m high, closed by a sliding wooden shutter, operated from above, with two circular towers flanking the opening. Behind the door is the cavaedium, a rectangular security courtyard for defensive needs, closed by walls, open to the sky, with a double door leading to the city. To the left of the door a stone staircase leads to the patrol walk on the city walls, and to the manoeuvering room of the portcullis.

=== Domus ===
The domus discovered from 2023 onwards contained a unique domestic hot water system with a large lead cylindrical vessel for heating water and connected to pipes for distribution.
