= Macchia Valfortore =

- Comune
- Comune di Macchia Valfortore
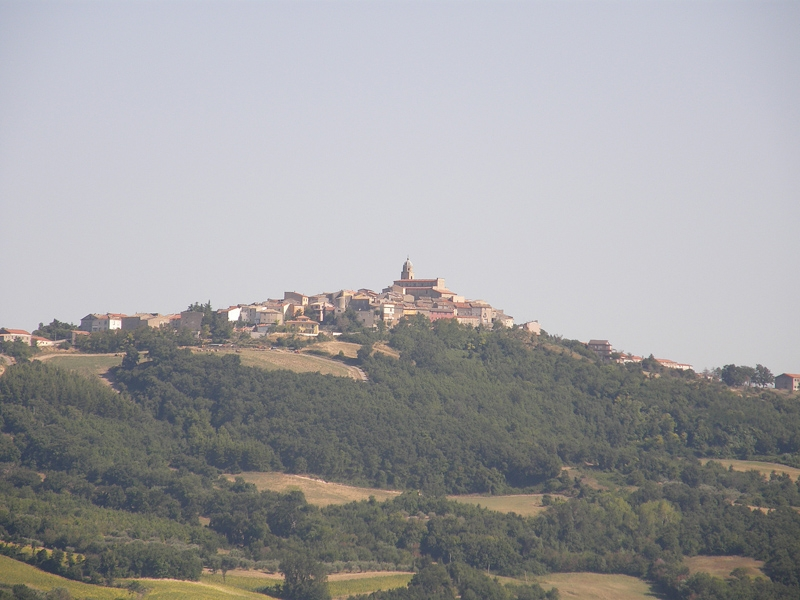
- Panorama of Macchia Valfortore

- Coat of arms

- Location within Italy Location within Molise
- Coordinates: 41°36′N 14°55′E
- Country: Italy
- Region: Molise
- Province: Campobasso (CB)

Government
  - Mayor: Gianfranco Paolucci (since 2023)

Area
  - Total: 26.77 km^{2} (10.34 sq mi)
- Elevation: 477 m (1,565 ft)

Population (April 2024)
  - Total: 470
  - Density: 18/km^{2} (45/sq mi)
- Demonym: Macchiaroli
- Time zone: UTC+1 (CET)
  - Summer (DST): UTC+2 (CEST)
- Postal code: 86040
- Dialing code: 0874
- Patron saint: St. Nicholas
- Saint day: December 6
- Website: Official website

Macchia Valfortore is a town and comune in the Province of Campobasso, Molise, southern Italy. With a population of 470 inhabitants. The town overlooks Lake Occhito. Neighbouring comuni are Sant'Elia a Pianisi and Pietracatella.

== History ==
In 216 BC, a Roman army under consul Varro camped in the town called Maccla, thought to be this town, prior to marching to the defeat against Hannibal at the Battle of Cannae. In 476 AD with the Western Roman Empire weakening, Maccla was occupied by the Visigoths. In the early Middle Ages it was a possession of the Lombards, who held it until 982, when they were defeated by the Byzantines.

On September 21, 1701, Gaetano Giacomo Gambacorta, styled the Prince of Macchia, started a conspiracy (Macchia Conspiracy), against the Spanish viceroy in Naples. The revolt was quickly put down and Gaetano fled to Vienna, Austria where he died on January 27, 1703. In 1800 Joseph Bonaparte, King of Naples and Napoleon's brother, divided Naples into new administrative orders. This created the Province of Campobasso which Macchia is located to this day. The suffix Valfortore was added in the 19th century.

== Symbols ==
The municipal coat of arms depicts a tower and a cow in the upper part, symbol of the agricultural nature of the community; in the lower part are reproduced the three ancient gates of access to the town. The gonfalon is a blue cloth.

== Main sights ==
- Church of San Nicola: 16th century church with 12 busts of Saints made of wood created by Giacomo Colombus of Naples.
- Cinelli Palace
- Monument to the Fallen
- Monument of Padre Pio
