= Fortore =

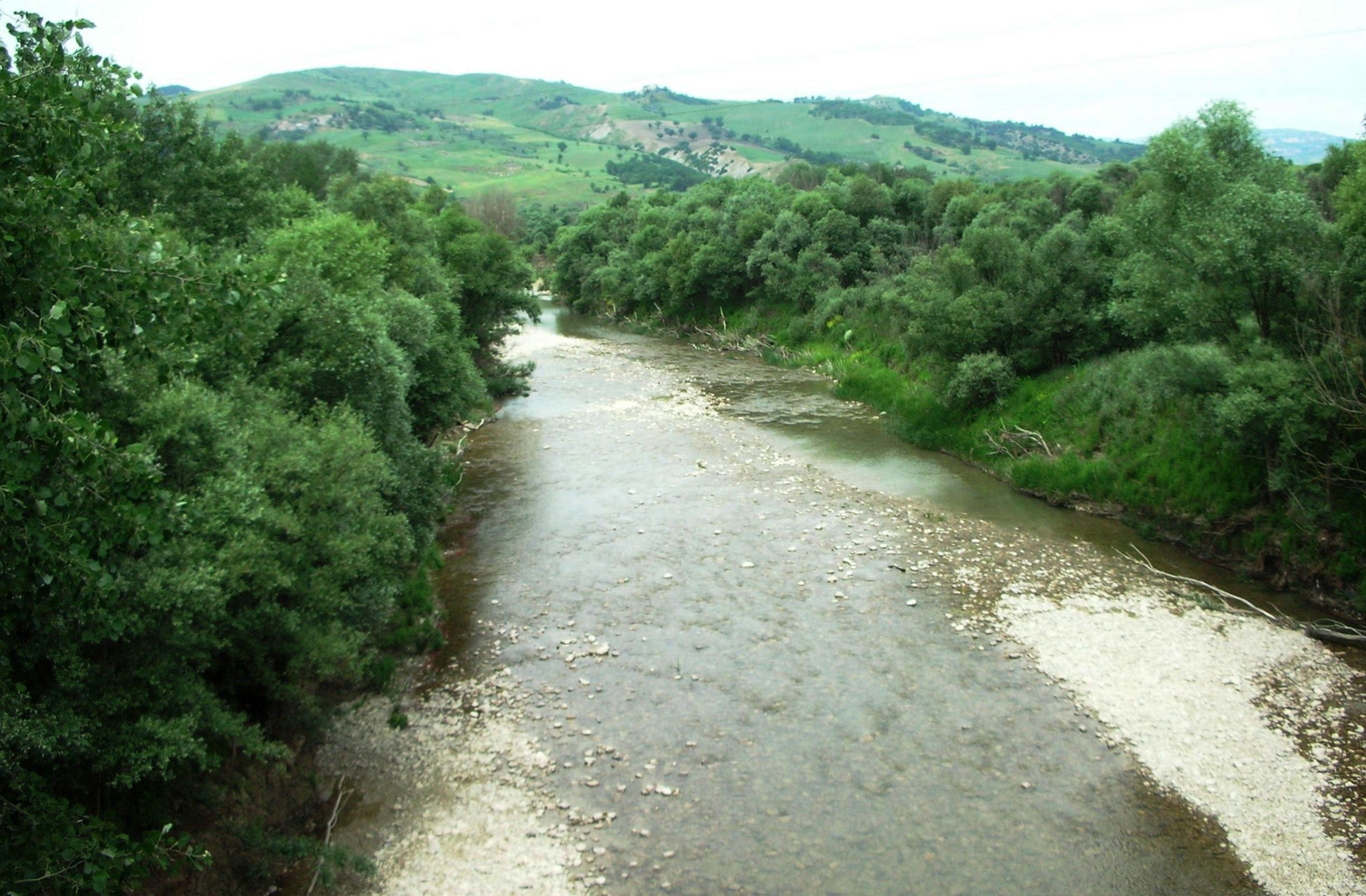

Location
- Country: Italy

Physical characteristics
- Source
  - location: Monte Altieri
  - elevation: 840 m (2,760 ft)
- Mouth: Adriatic Sea
  - location: near Lake Lesina
  - coordinates: 41.9199°N 15.2930°E
  - elevation: 0 m (0 ft)
- Length: 110 km (68 mi)

The Fortore (Latin: Fertor or Frento) is a river which flows through the provinces of Benevento, Campobasso and Foggia in southern Italy. It is 110 kilometres (68 mi) long. The river rises from the slopes of Monte Altieri, which reaches 888 metres (2,913 ft) above sea level. The Fortore, on the Adriatic side of the Apennines, collects the waters of four small streams about 4 kilometres (2 mi) from San Bartolomeo in Galdo. From there it runs in a northerly direction through a narrow and twisting valley between the Daunian Mountains. After 22 kilometres (14 mi), near Castelvetere in Val Fortore, it exits from the province of Benevento. In its lower course it forms the border between the provinces of Campobasso and Foggia. The Fortore flows into the Adriatic Sea not far from Lake Lesina.

Lago di Occhito was created by damming part of the Fortore.

== See also ==
- Battle of Civitate
