= Ferrazzano =

- Comune
- Comune di Ferrazzano
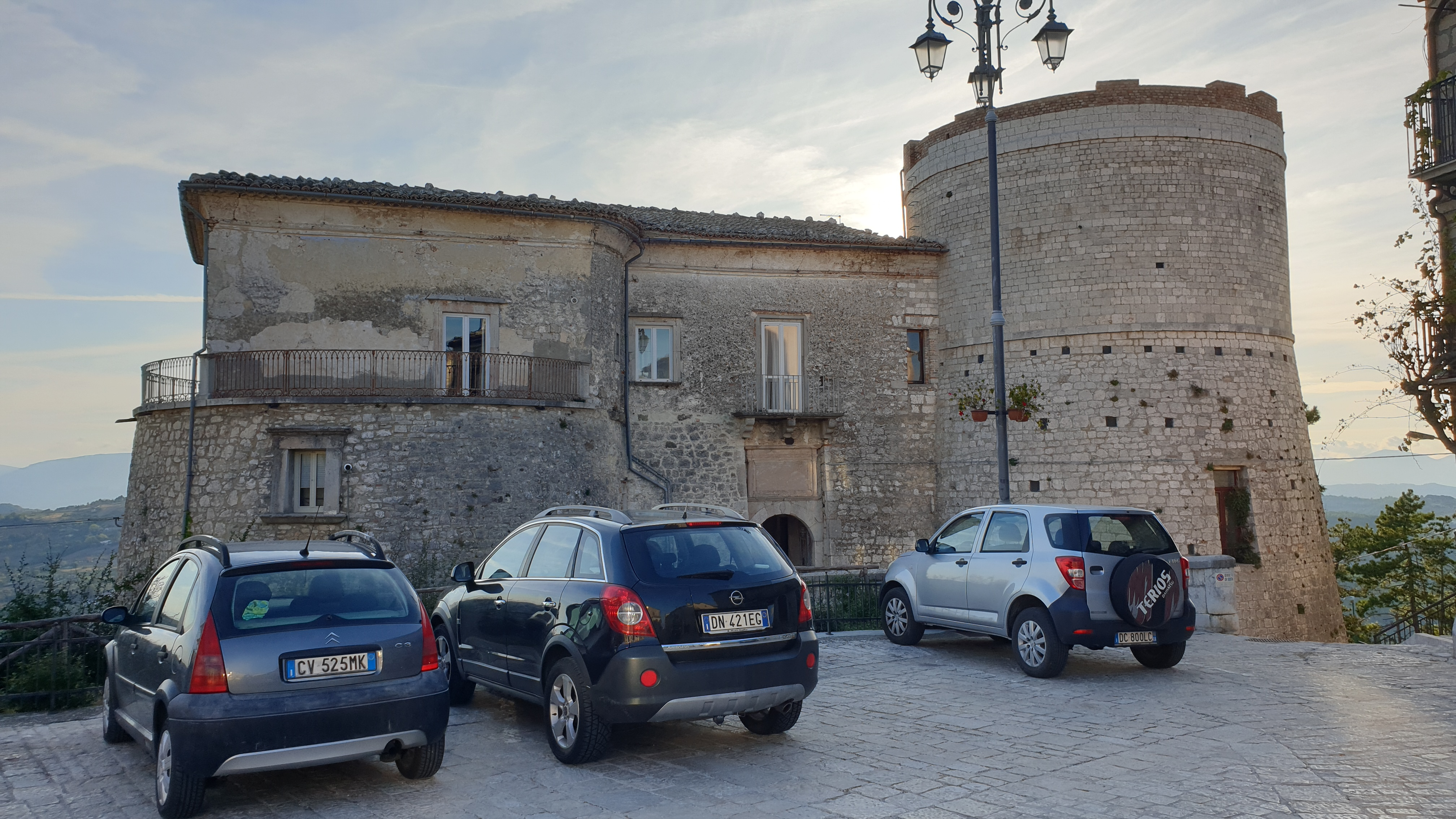
- View of Ferrazzano

- Coat of arms

- Location within Italy Location within Molise
- Coordinates: 41°32′N 14°40′E
- Country: Italy
- Region: Molise
- Province: Campobasso (CB)

Government
  - Mayor: Antonio Cerio

Area
  - Total: 16.77 km^{2} (6.47 sq mi)
- Elevation: 870 m (2,850 ft)

Population (30 November 2017)
  - Total: 3,317
  - Density: 197.8/km^{2} (512.3/sq mi)
- Demonym: Ferrazzanesi
- Time zone: UTC+1 (CET)
  - Summer (DST): UTC+2 (CEST)
- Postal code: 86010
- Dialing code: 0874
- Patron saint: St. Anthony of Padua
- Saint day: 13 June
- Website: Official website

Ferrazzano is a town and comune in the province of Campobasso, in the Italian region of Molise. It is located 5 km (3 mi) south of Campobasso.

The town is a medieval village sited on a hilltop in central Italy, in the mountains about halfway across the "knee" of the Italian peninsula. The village is composed of fieldstone row houses with clay tile roofs. The village hosts a small castle with a stone turret, and a Catholic church of The Assumption.

== History ==
During the Roman era, the region was populated by Samnites who fought the Roman invaders in the first Samnite wars. When they realized that Roman leader Sulla was on the verge of victory (he who had already destroyed the nearby towns of Morcone and Bojano around 100 BC), they gathered old men, women, children and herds and migrated eastwards toward Lucera, abandoning their huts and other shelters. Sulla established a garrison at the top of the hill, around which houses were subsequently built and the nucleus of the town was built.

The town is mentioned for the first time in 953 AD as "loco Firaciani".

In the 12th century Ferrazzano was ruled by Riccardo Camarda, from 1269 by the family of Giniaco and later by the house of Sangro; later it became a fief of De Sus.

== Transport ==
The nearest railway station is Campobasso.

== Notables ==
- American actor Robert De Niro's great-grandparents, Giovanni Di Niro and Angelina Mercurio, immigrated to the United States from Ferrazzano in 1887.
