= Gildone =

- Comune
- Comune di Gildone
- Coat of arms

- Location within Italy Location within Molise
- Coordinates: 41°31′N 14°44′E
- Country: Italy
- Region: Molise
- Province: Campobasso (CB)

Government
  - Mayor: Nicola Vecchiullo (since 2019)

Area
  - Total: 29 km^{2} (11 sq mi)
- Elevation: 608 m (1,995 ft)

Population (2024)
  - Total: 750
  - Density: 26/km^{2} (67/sq mi)
- Demonym: Gildonese (plural: Gildonesi)
- Time zone: UTC+1 (CET)
  - Summer (DST): UTC+2 (CEST)
- Postal code: 86010
- Dialing code: 0874
- Patron saint: San Sabino

Gildone is a hill town and comune in the province of Campobasso, in the Molise region (southern Italy). At its peak, the town consisted of 3,000 inhabitants, but the population now numbers about 750. The town is in a rural area surrounded by farms dotted with olive trees and sheep, and is located about 15 minutes southeast of the city of Campobasso.

== Emigration ==
As part of the wider Italian mass-emigration, many of Gildone's inhabitants left the town in search of economic betterment. The first emigrants left around the turn of the 20th century and mainly settled in Brooklyn, New York, and Cleveland, Ohio, also Colorado, in the United States. (There is a plaque in Gildone's main church St. Sabino, commemorating the financial contribution of the Gildonese émigré community of Cleveland towards the church's restoration in 1923.) Following the Second World War, in light of stricter immigration laws into the United States, Gildonesi emigrants sought new lives elsewhere. A vast amount relocated to Montreal, Quebec, Canada, where in fact, the number of Gildonesi and their descendants exceeds the current population of the town itself. The traditions of Gildone continue to survive in the émigré community of Montreal, such as the August pepper feast and anniversary of Santa Maria delle Grazie, which are maintained by the local Associazione Gildonese. Other major Gildonese communities exist in New York, Melbourne, Toronto, Belgium, Buenos Aires, São Paulo and Caracas, with minor communities in Western Australia, the United Kingdom, Germany and Switzerland

== Landmarks ==
Gildone's main church contains art dating back centuries and one of the other churches in town was converted to a community hall in Spring 2006. Dating further back in time, located near the town are the remains of an ancient Samnite necropolis.

== Local economy ==
As with much of Southern Italy, the area surrounding Gildone consists mainly of small-scale, family-run farms. There is little in the way of significant industry.

A notable development in the local economy is the farming of water buffalo to produce milk for the production of Mozzarella di Bufala (Buffalo Mozzarella). The facility opened in 2006.

== Notable people ==
- Antonio Grande, great-grandfather of singer Ariana Grande
- Filomena Iavenditti, great-grandmother of Ariana Grande
