= Molisan =

Group of dialects of Neapolitan

Molisan is a group of dialects of the Neapolitan language spoken in Molise, a region of Southern Italy.

== Distribution ==
For centuries, the area of Molise was part of the Kingdom of Naples, and later part of the Kingdom of the Two Sicilies. It is not spoken in a large area (over Isernia, Termoli and Riccia), but within this area there are many linguistic variations due to diverging historical events. Before the Italian unification some eastern parts of Molise were part of the Province of Foggia (Capitanata), whilst some western areas, in particular Venafro, were part of the Terra di Lavoro (literally "Land of Work"), and Upper Molise was part of Abruzzo.

For this very reason, the dialect spoken in Venafro may well be likened to the dialects of Campania and Naples. Some areas have also experienced an upsurge of minority languages such as Serbo-Croatian and Albanian, whereas other areas of Molise represent isolated communities with little outside contact, who consequently appear to be more conservative. The Frentana area (Termoli, Larino, Trivento) and Upper Molise has dialects that are more closely related to Southern Abruzzese.

Similarly to Naples Neapolitan, Molisan contains words and sounds that are similar to those in Spanish but are not necessarily of Spanish origin. These include sartania ("frypan", similar to Spanish sartén), sctreppiàte ("broken", similar to Spanish estropeado), and petacce ("piece", similar to Spanish pedazo). The Roccamandolfi dialect of Isernia, a province in Molise, shares many phonetic characteristics with Spanish.

With the exception of loan words from Italian and Neapolitan, it has no palatal gl sound (/ʎ/, similar to the second syllable of million in the Received Pronunciation accent of British English) and instead employs the intervocalic /j/. Roccamandolfi also maintains diphthongisation in metaphony through ue, rather than Standard Italian uo, such as in fuéche (Italian fuoco, "fire"), cuéche (Italian cuoco, "cook") and uéve (Italian uovo, "egg"). Molisan also contains lexis derived from a substratum of Oscan, a language spoken by the Samnites. For example, pjéskje ("rocks" or "stones") is related to Oscan *psk.

== Characteristics ==
As typical in the Neapolitan language, the Molisan dialect group employs vowel reduction. In all unstressed positions, vowels (often with the exception of a) are presented by schwa /ə/, whilst vowels in a stressed position are fully pronounced. This is in line with Standard Italian phonology, in that the schwa never appears in a stressed position. Any vowel following a stressed syllable in a certain word is pronounced as a schwa. A final unstressed vowel, when followed by a pause, may be used for emphasis and is only mandatory when the word is immediately followed by a word with an initial consonant. Note that the schwa is a phoneme in itself, and distinguishes words of different meanings such as I səparə ("I separate myself") and I sparə ("I shoot"). The Molisan dialect group also displays the following phonological features.

- short pronunciation of single voiceless z compared to the more elongated Italian pronunciation, e.g. Italian situazione ("situation"): [situ.atˈtsjoːne]; Molisan: [sətwaˈtsjoːnə];
- all voiceless consonants following nasals become voiced, a phenomenon particularly common in many Central Italian dialects, e.g. Italian ancora ("still") is pronounced in Molisan as angora);
- pronunciation of /s/ as [ʃ] (as in she) when it immediately precedes /t/, in direct opposition with the Neapolitan phenomenon in which /s/ is pronounced as sh except when immediately preceding /t/;

In the western area of the region (the Province of Isernia) spoken dialects share some common features:

- rhotacism of masculine definite articles, e.g. Italian il cane ("the dog") becomes re cuàne in Roccamandolfi, and l'uccellino ("little bird") becomes ru cellùcce;
- rhotacism of /d/, although this is applied inconsistently;
- palatalization of Italian ll to gl, e.g. Italian cappello ("hat") becomes cappiégle;
- displacement of the central stressed a when it appears between /a/, /e/ or /o/ in past participles, e.g. Italian mangiato ("eaten") becomes magnæt.

The eastern and Adriatic Sea areas of Molise (the Province of Campobasso) hosts yet more linguistic variation, with some features nonhomogeneously distributed across the region:

- closure of stressed e when not appearing at the beginning of a word, e.g. Italian bène ("well", "good") becomes béne, in the regional capital;
- closure of stressed o when in the middle of the word, e.g. Italian vòlta ("time") becomes vóte in the regional capital;
- palatalisation of the central a when immediately preceding the word's stressed syllable, e.g. Italian Madonna becomes Medonne, and pallone ("ball") becomes pellone, in the area of Ripalimosani.
