= Monacilioni =

- Comune
- Comune di Monacilioni
- Location within Italy Location within Molise
- Coordinates: 41°37′N 14°49′E
- Country: Italy
- Region: Molise
- Province: Campobasso (CB)

Government
  - Mayor: Michele Turro

Area
  - Total: 27.21 km^{2} (10.51 sq mi)
- Elevation: 590 m (1,940 ft)

Population (31 October 2017)
  - Total: 494
  - Density: 18.2/km^{2} (47.0/sq mi)
- Demonym: Monacilionesi
- Time zone: UTC+1 (CET)
  - Summer (DST): UTC+2 (CEST)
- Postal code: 86040
- Dialing code: 0874
- Website: Official website

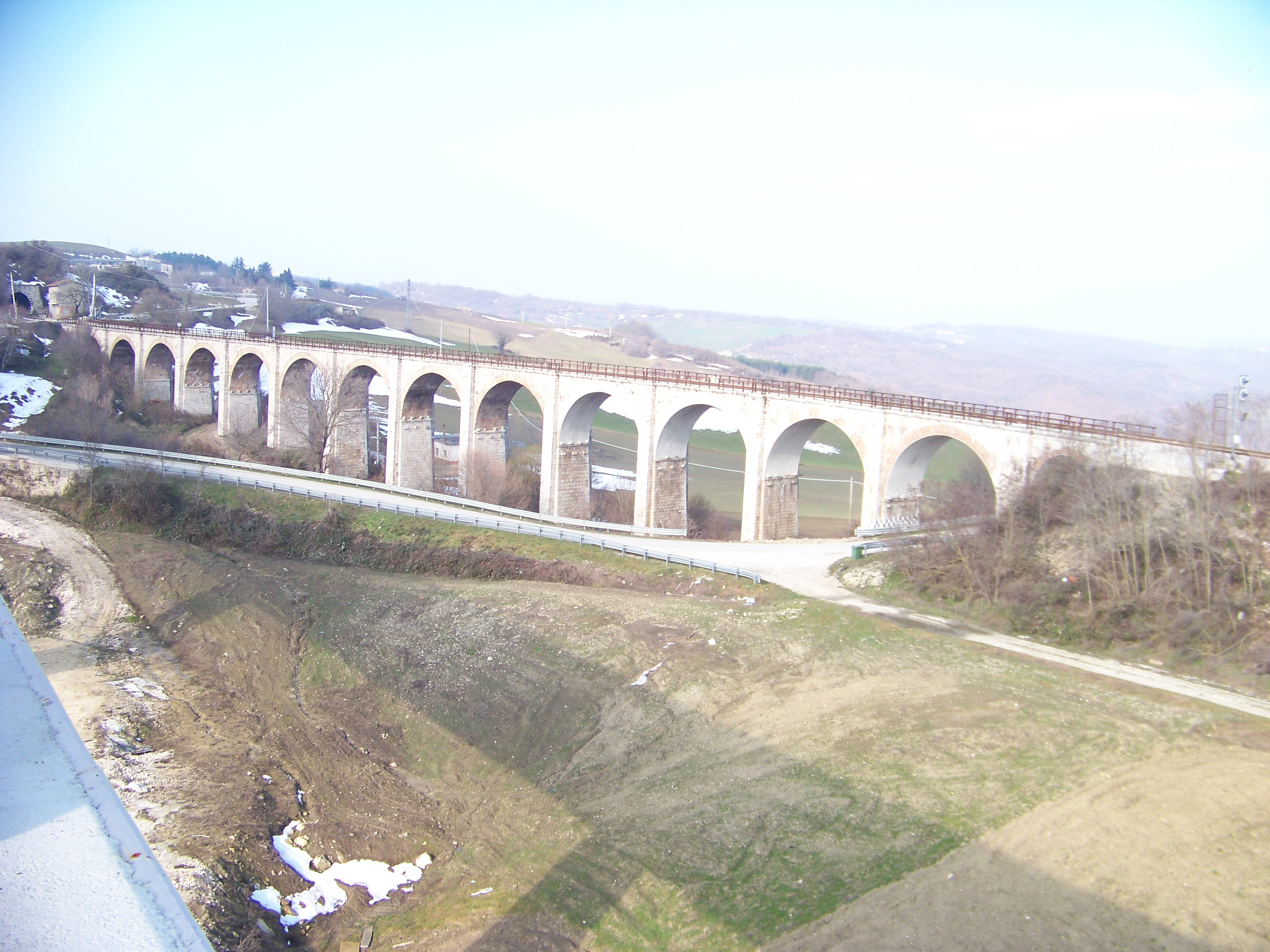
Railway bridge near Campolieto-Monacilioni's train station.

Monacilioni is a small town in the province of Campobasso, Molise, southern Italy, located 31 kilometres (19 mi) northeast of Campobasso.

Monacilioni was originally shaped in a circular fashion with one main intersecting street. During the latter half of the 20th century, a significant portion of the town was destroyed in a series of landslides.
