= 1805 Molise earthquake =

Earthquake in Italy

- Location within Italy
- Local date: 26 July 1805
- Magnitude: 6.6 M_{e}
- Epicenter: 41.5°N 14.467°E
- Areas affected: Molise, Campania, Kingdom of Naples
- Max. intensity: MMI X (Extreme)
- Casualties: 5,573

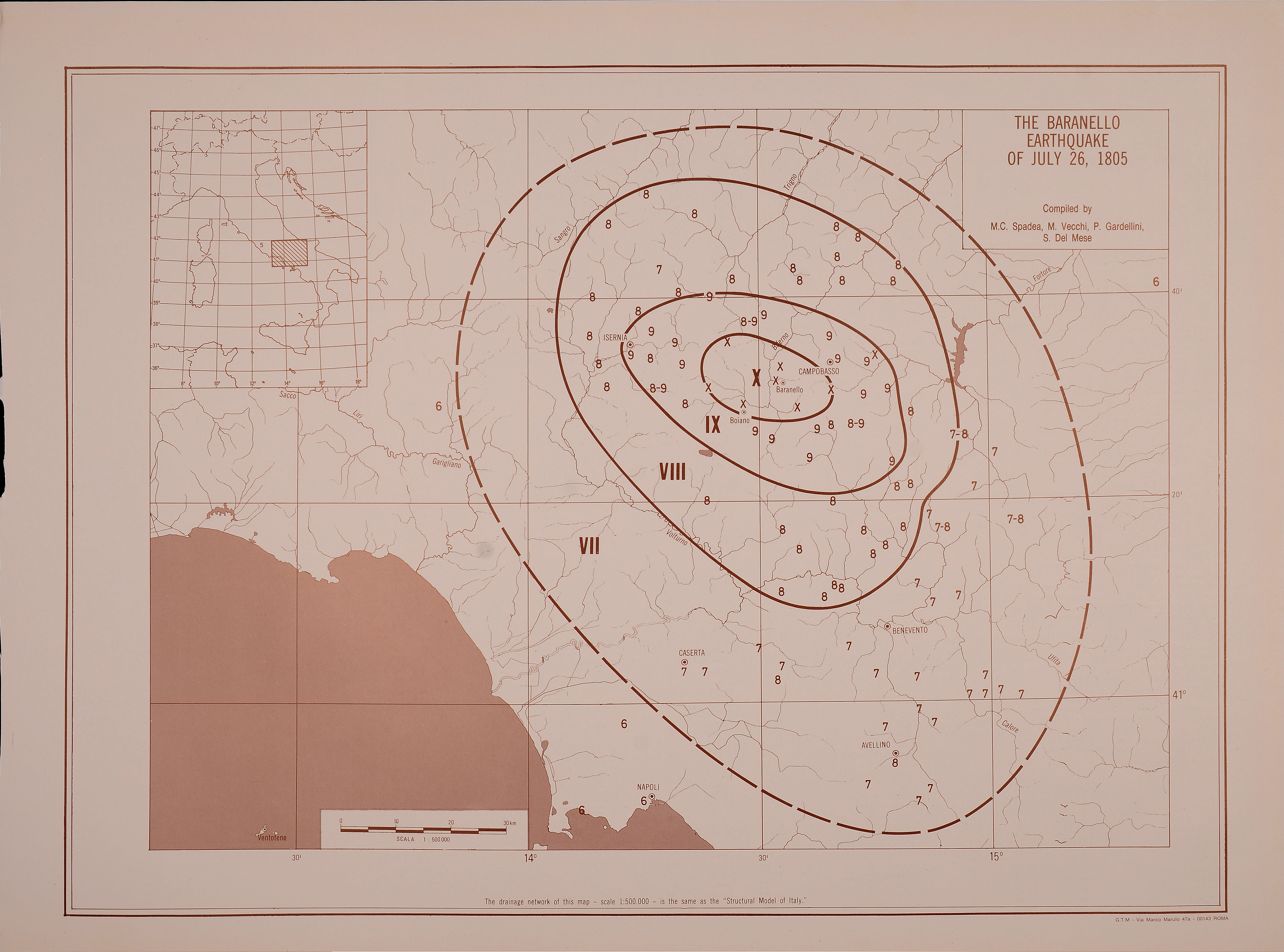
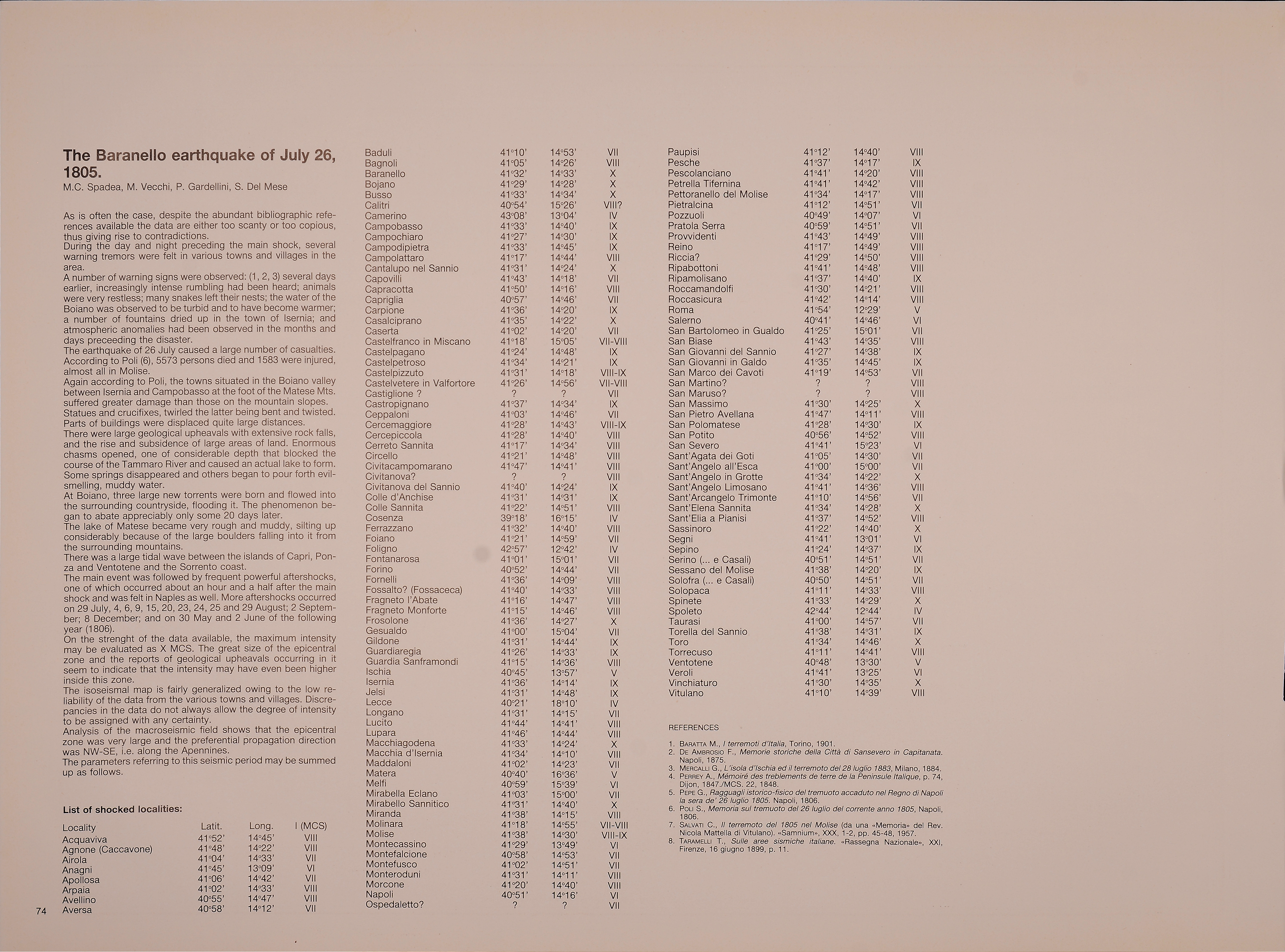
Map and description of the event - Atlas of isoseismal maps of Italian earthquakes

The 1805 Molise earthquake occurred on 26 July at 21:01 UTC. It has an estimated magnitude of 6.6 on the equivalent magnitude scale (M_{e}) (calculated from seismic intensity data) and a maximum perceived intensity of X on the Mercalli intensity scale. The area of greatest damage was between the towns of Isernia and Campobasso, while the area of intense damage extended over about 2,000 square kilometres. There were an estimated 5,573 deaths resulting from this earthquake and two of the aftershocks.

== Tectonic setting ==
The Southern Apennines originated as northeast moving fold and thrust belt. Since the Middle Pleistocene, the tectonics has been dominated by extension. The axial part of the Apennines is the most seismically active, with a series of damaging historical earthquakes up to about 7 in magnitude. The major normal fault in the epicentral area of the 1805 event is the Bojano fault system.

== Earthquake ==
The earthquake was a result of movement on the NW–SE trending Bojano fault system. A surface rupture of 40 km has been attributed to this event, with a maximum displacement of 150 cm. The mainshock was preceded by a series of low intensity foreshocks throughout the previous day. The aftershock sequence continued until the following June.

== Damage ==
Place	Intensity	Population	Dead	Injured	Comments
Baranello	X	2420	296	204	Town completely destroyed
Cantalupo nel Sannio	X	2000	220	42	Nearly complete destruction of the town
Carpinone	X	2240	50	49	Nearly complete destruction of the town
Castelpagano	X	2100	159	18	Only three houses left standing
Frosolone	X	3800	1000	46	Town completely destroyed
Guardiaregia	X	2000	202	40	Nearly complete destruction of the town
San Massimo	X	1280	41	54	Nearly complete destruction of the town
San Polomatese	X	1000	128	20	The few remaining houses were uninhabitable
Casalciprano	IX–X	1300	186	30	Nearly complete destruction of the town
Castelpetroso	IX–X	2000	57	40	Many houses collapsed, the rest were badly damaged
Gildone	IX–X	2200	26	?	More than half the houses were destroyed and many others had to be demolished
Isernia	IX–X	4970	1000	50	Only a tenth of the houses were left standing, although badly damaged
Mirabello Sannitico	IX–X	2000	359	31	The baronial palace was destroyed
Pesche	IX–X	1500	3	4
Sant’Angelo in Grotte	IX–X	1100	64	100	Two churches were destroyed, a third was damaged
Sassinoro	IX–X	1500	59	75	The few remaining houses were uninhabitable
Spinete	IX–X	2400	300	19	The chapel of San Giovanni was badly damaged
Toro	IX–X	2400	274	88	Only seven houses left standing
Vinchiaturo	IX–X	3000	305	214	Nearly complete destruction of the town
Bojano	IX	2550	124	?	Larger buildings were particularly badly affected, including the Bishop's Palace, the cathedral, the monastery and 12 churches
Cameli	IX	1500	55	25	Nearly complete destruction of the town
Campobasso	IX	5700	39	60	The prison was so damaged as to be unusable
Colle d'Anchise	IX	1200	50	30	Nearly half of the village was destroyed
Macchiagodena	IX	2000	193	11
San Giuliano del Sannio	IX	2000	92	90
Sepino	IX	3400	63	40	The cathedral collapsed
Sessano del Molise	IX	1500	9	4
Arpaia	VIII–IX	987	11	?	32 buildings collapsed
Busso	VIII–IX	1500	70	83	The hilly parts of the town suffered the most damage
Campodipietra	VIII–IX		11	50	Half the town was badly damaged
Civita	VIII–IX	900	36
Colle Sannita	VIII–IX	4000	44
Jelsi	VIII–IX	207	27
Reino	VIII–IX	800	2		18 houses collapsed
Ripalimosani	VIII–IX	3500	2	2
Torella del Sannio	VIII–IX	1300	6	12
Vitulano	VIII–IX	6433	4
Agnone	VIII	4000	9
Avellino	VIII	10194	11	4
Civitavecchia	VIII	1150	2
Fossaceca	VIII	2500	12	6
Macchia d'Isernia	VIII	684	2
Monteroduni	VIII	1600	5	1
Morcone	VIII		7
San Martino Sannita	VIII	3156	5		13 houses collapsed
Santa Maria Capua Vetere	VIII		80		80 soldiers died when the cavalry barracks collapsed
Serino	VIII	8000	4
Torrecuso	VIII	2900	1

The damage was particularly intense in the foothills of the Matese massif and the Bojano plain, with 30 towns and villages being severely affected. Damage was recorded as far away as Naples and Salerno. Landslides and other slope failures were seen over an area of about 5,300 square kilometres.

The official number of recorded deaths is given as 5,573, representing nearly 3% of the area's inhabitants, with a further 1,583 injured. Other estimates of the death toll are in the range 4,000 to 6,000.

== Aftermath ==
=== Response ===
The most affected area lay within the then Kingdom of Naples. The king, Ferdinand IV, took control of the response to this disaster. He sent Gabriele Giannocoli, a tax lawyer, to visit those areas of the countryside that has suffered the most, to evaluate the situation and to do what needed to be done. He was given considerable powers, together with the financial means, to allow him to carry out his task. He concentrated on visiting the most damaged areas, relying on reports from other officials in less affected parts. At his request, soldiers were sent to restore order and to prevent looting in some areas. Only properties in a dangerous state were repaired or demolished. Temporary shelters were provided for the homeless and huts for use as hospitals. Taxes were suspended by the king for all of the countryside around Molise in August.

== See also ==
- List of earthquakes in Italy
- List of historical earthquakes
