= San Giuliano del Sannio =

- Comune
- Comune di San Giuliano del Sannio
- Coat of arms

- Location within Italy Location within Molise
- Coordinates: 41°27′N 14°38′E
- Country: Italy
- Region: Molise
- Province: Campobasso (CB)

Government
  - Mayor: Angelo Codagnone

Area
  - Total: 24.05 km^{2} (9.29 sq mi)
- Elevation: 621 m (2,037 ft)

Population (30 November 2017)
  - Total: 997
  - Density: 41.5/km^{2} (107/sq mi)
- Demonym: Sangiulianesi
- Time zone: UTC+1 (CET)
  - Summer (DST): UTC+2 (CEST)
- Postal code: 86010
- Dialing code: 0874
- Website: Official website

San Giuliano del Sannio is a comune (municipality) in the Province of Campobasso in the Italian region Molise, located about 13 kilometres (8 mi) south of Campobasso.

San Giuliano del Sannio borders the following municipalities: Cercepiccola, Guardiaregia, Mirabello Sannitico, Sepino, Vinchiaturo.
