= Cercepiccola =

- Comune
- Comune di Cercepiccola
- Location within Italy Location within Molise
- Coordinates: 41°28′N 14°40′E
- Country: Italy
- Region: Molise
- Province: Campobasso (CB)

Government
  - Mayor: Michele Nardacchione

Area
  - Total: 16.79 km^{2} (6.48 sq mi)
- Elevation: 680 m (2,230 ft)

Population (30 November 2017)
  - Total: 659
  - Density: 39.2/km^{2} (102/sq mi)
- Demonym: Cercepiccolesi
- Time zone: UTC+1 (CET)
  - Summer (DST): UTC+2 (CEST)
- Postal code: 86010
- Dialing code: 0874
- Website: Official website

Cercepiccola is a comune (municipality) in the Province of Campobasso in the Italian region Molise, located about 11 kilometres (7 mi) south of Campobasso.

Cercepiccola borders the following municipalities: Cercemaggiore, Mirabello Sannitico, San Giuliano del Sannio, Sepino.
