= Piero Niro =

Italian composer

Piero Niro (born 1957) is an Italian composer, classical pianist, and academic specialising in the philosophy of music and aesthetics.

Niro was born in Baranello in the southern Italian region of Molise and initially studied piano and composition at the music conservatory in Campobasso before transferring to the Accademia Santa Cecilia in Rome where he received diplomas in piano and composition. He also received a Laurea in philosophy at the University of Rome Tor Vergata before going on to postgraduate studies in composition Accademia Santa Cecilia with Karlheinz Stockhausen and Franco Donatoni.

His string quartet won First Prize at the 1985 Concorso Internazionale Ennio Porrino. Three of his compositions have subsequently been published by Ricordi:

- 3 Pezzi for solo piano
- Game for piano, flute, clarinet, 2 violins viola and cello (broadcast by the RAI in 1989)
- Ottetto for flute, oboe, clarinet, bassoon, 2 violins, viola, and cello

Since 1989 Niro has been of Head of the Composition department of the Conservatorio di Musica Lorenzo Perosi in Campobasso where he is also Professor of Philosophy of Music and Aesthetics and Analysis and Theory of Music. Amongst his publications on music and aesthetics is his 2008 study of Wittgenstein, Ludwig Wittgenstein e la musica (Naples: Edizioni Scientifiche Italiane).
