= List of mayors of Campobasso =

Mayor of Campobasso
- Sindaco di Campobasso
- Incumbent; Marialuisa Forte since 25 June 2024
- Appointer: Popular election
- Term length: 5 years, renewable once
- Website: Official website

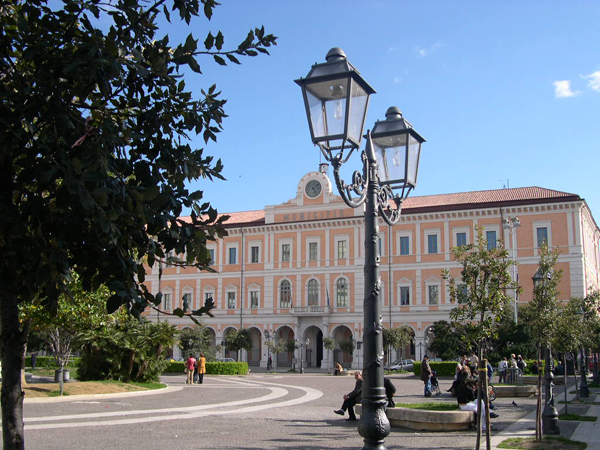
Campobasso's Town Hall.

The mayor of Campobasso is an elected politician who, along with the Campobasso's city council, is accountable for the strategic government of Campobasso in Molise, Italy.

The current mayor is Marialuisa Forte, a centre-left independent, who took office on 25 June 2024.

== Overview ==
According to the Italian Constitution, the mayor of Campobasso is member of the city council.

The mayor is elected by the population of Campobasso, who also elect the members of the city council, controlling the mayor's policy guidelines and is able to enforce his resignation by a motion of no confidence. The mayor is entitled to appoint and release the members of his government.

Since 1994 the mayor is elected directly by Campobasso's electorate: in all mayoral elections in Italy in cities with a population higher than 15,000 the voters express a direct choice for the mayor or an indirect choice voting for the party of the candidate's coalition. If no candidate receives at least 50% of votes, the top two candidates go to a second round after two weeks. The election of the City Council is based on a direct choice for the candidate with a preference vote: the candidate with the majority of the preferences is elected. The number of the seats for each party is determined proportionally.

== Italian Republic (since 1946) ==
=== City Council election (1946-1995) ===
From 1946 to 1995, the Mayor of Campobasso was elected by the City Council.

	Mayor	Term start	Term end	Party
1	Ferruccio Impallomeni	1946	1947	PDL
2	Alessandro De Gaglia	1947	1953	DC
3	Angelo Martino	1953	1954	Ind
(2)	Alessandro De Gaglia	1954	1960	DC
4	Alessio Rizzi	1960	1962	Ind
5	Carlo Vitale	1962	1970	DC
6	Franco Nucciarone	1970	1974	DC
7	Umberto Porzio	1974	1975	Ind
8	Nunzio Ruta	1975	1980	DC
9	Antonio Macchiarola	1980	1980	DC
10	Gerardo Litterio	1980	1990	DC
11	Vittorio Rizzi	1990	1992	DC
12	Vincenzo Di Grezia	1992	1995	DC

=== Direct election (since 1995) ===
Since 1995, under provisions of new local administration law, the Mayor of Campobasso is chosen by direct election, originally every four, then every five years.

	Mayor	Term start	Term end	Party	Coalition	Election
13	Augusto Massa	8 May 1995	14 June 1999	PDS; DS	PDS • PPI • PdD • PRC	1995
13	Augusto Massa	14 June 1999	14 June 2004	PDS; DS	DS • PPI • PdCI • SDI • PRC	1999
14	Giuseppe Di Fabio	14 June 2004	8 June 2009	PD	DS • DL • PRC • SDI	2004
15	Luigi Di Bartolomeo	8 June 2009	29 May 2014	PdL	PdL • MpA • UDC	2009
16	Antonio Battista	29 May 2014	11 June 2019	PD	PD • IdV • UDC	2014
17	Roberto Gravina	11 June 2019	28 September 2023 (Note: Resigned after being elected regional councillor. The deputy Mayor Paola Felice (M5S) held the office till a new municipal election was held.)	M5S	M5S	2019
18	Marialuisa Forte	25 June 2024	Incumbent	Ind	PD • M5S • AVS	2024
