= Campochiaro =

- Comune
- Comune di Campochiaro
- Location within Italy Location within Molise
- Coordinates: 41°27′N 14°31′E
- Country: Italy
- Region: Molise
- Province: Campobasso (CB)

Government
  - Mayor: Simona Valente

Area
  - Total: 35.7 km^{2} (13.8 sq mi)
- Elevation Campochiaresi: 750 m (2,460 ft)

Population (30 November 2017)
  - Total: 636
  - Density: 17.8/km^{2} (46.1/sq mi)
- Time zone: UTC+1 (CET)
  - Summer (DST): UTC+2 (CEST)
- Postal code: 86020
- Dialing code: 0874
- Website: Official website

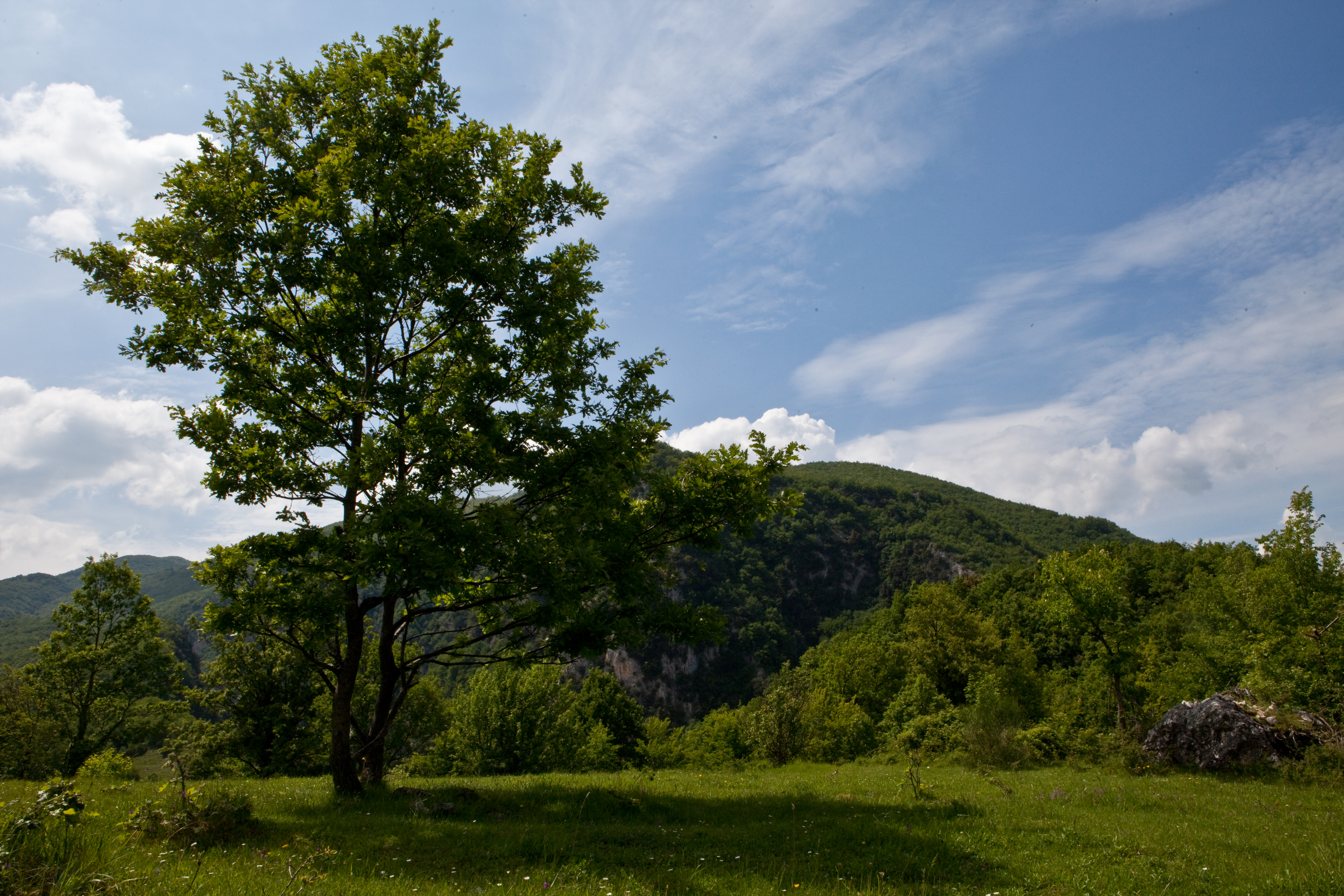
Regional reserve of Guardiaregia-Campochiaro.

Campochiaro is a comune (municipality) in the Province of Campobasso in the Italian region Molise, located about 20 kilometres (12 mi) southwest of Campobasso.

Campochiaro borders the following municipalities: Castello del Matese, Colle d'Anchise, Guardiaregia, Piedimonte Matese, San Gregorio Matese, San Polo Matese, Vinchiaturo.
