= Antonio Battista =

Italian politician

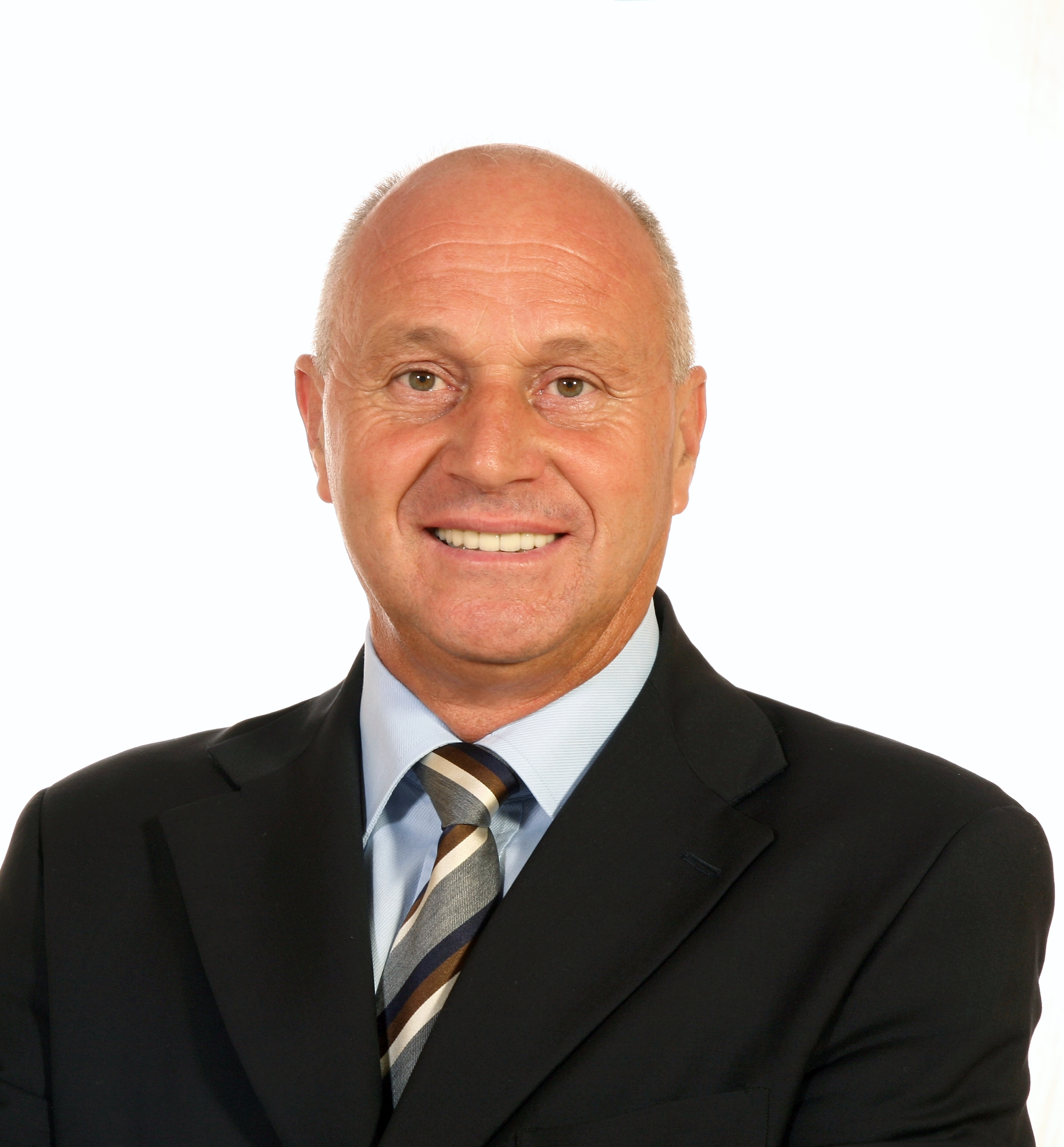

Mayor of Campobasso
- In office 29 May 2014 – 11 June 2019
- Preceded by: Luigi Di Bartolomeo
- Succeeded by: Roberto Gravina

President of the Province of Campobasso
- In office 1 September 2016 – 11 June 2019
- Preceded by: Rosario De Matteis
- Succeeded by: Francesco Roberti

Personal details
- Born: 10 February 1957 (age 69) Campobasso, Molise, Italy
- Party: Italian People's Party (1994-2002); The Daisy (2002-2007); Democratic Party (since 2007)
- Profession: railwayman

Antonio Battista (born 10 February 1957 in Campobasso) is an Italian politician.

He is a member of the Democratic Party.

Battista was the mayor of Campobasso from May 2014 to June 2019. He was also elected president of the Province of Campobasso on 1 September 2016 until June 2019 when he was replaced by Francesco Roberti.

== Biography ==
In the 1995 local elections, he was elected to the Campobasso City Council as a member of the Italian People's Party, where he served as Chair of the Committee on Transportation, Traffic, and Public space.

Re-elected in the 1999 local elections, alongside List of mayors of Campobasso Augusto Massa, he served as councilor for social policies.

In the 2004 local elections, running as a candidate for Democracy is Freedom – The Daisy, he was re-elected and appointed by Mayor Giuseppe Di Fabio to serve as councilor for the budget and assets.

In the 2009 local elections, he was re-elected as a member of the Democratic Party (Italy), for which he also served as the group leader on the Campobasso City Council.

From 2011 to 2014, he served as organizational secretary of the Molise branch of the PD, under regional secretary Danilo Leva.

In the local elections held on May 25, 2014, he ran for mayor of Campobasso, where he was elected in the first round, receiving 50.01% of the vote with 15,374 votes.

On September 1, 2016, he was elected president of the Province of Province of Campobasso with 73.9% of the vote through a weighted voting system, following the reform that transformed the provinces into second-tier local government bodies in which the governing bodies are elected by mayors and municipal council members.

Ahead of the 2019 PD primary elections, he signed a petition alongside other mayors (including 200 of them) in support of the “Piazza Grande” motion put forward by Nicola Zingaretti, president of the Lazio Region since March 12, 2013, and the candidate with the longest administrative career, who went on to win with 66% of the vote.

He ran again in the 2019 local elections but finished in third place with 25.85% of the vote, failing to advance to the runoff, which was won by Five Star Movement candidate Roberto Gravina. From that day on, he stepped down as provincial president and was succeeded on an interim basis by Vice President Simona Contucci.

== See also ==
- 2014 Italian local elections
- List of mayors of Campobasso

Political offices
Preceded by Luigi Di Bartolomeo	Mayor of Campobasso; 2014–2019	Succeeded by Roberto Gravina
Preceded by Rosario De Matteis	President of the Province of Campobasso; 2016–2019	Succeeded by Francesco Roberti
