= Marialuisa Forte =

Italian politician

Mayor of Campobasso
- Incumbent
- Assumed office 25 June 2024
- Preceded by: Roberto Gravina

Personal details
- Born: 22 March 1963 (age 63) Campobasso, Italy
- Party: Centre-left independent
- Education: Sapienza University of Rome
- Profession: Teacher, school principal

Marialuisa Forte (born 22 March 1963) is an Italian politician, Mayor of Campobasso since 25 June 2024 and the first woman to hold this office.

== Biography ==
After graduating in Classical literature at the Sapienza University of Rome in 1985, Forte worked for years in high schools, first as a teacher of humanistic subjects and then as a school principal.

Since 2018 she has been the superintendent of education in Campobasso.

=== Mayor of Campobasso ===
In the 2024 local elections, Forte became the centre-left candidate for the office of Mayor of Campobasso, supported by the Democratic Party, the Greens and Left Alliance and the Five Star Movement. Despite ranking second at the first round, she was elected in the run-off, thus becoming the first woman to lead the city of Campobasso.

Political offices
Preceded by Roberto Gravina	Mayor of Campobasso since 2024	Incumbent
