= Bulgarians in Italy =

Bulgarian immigrant community in Italy

The Bulgarians in Italy are one of the sizable communities of the Bulgarian diaspora in Western Europe. There are about 120,000 Bulgarians in Italy according to the Bulgarian government. There are Bulgarian Orthodox parishes in Rome and Milan. Major centres of Bulgarian migration are Milan, Bologna, Florence and Turin.

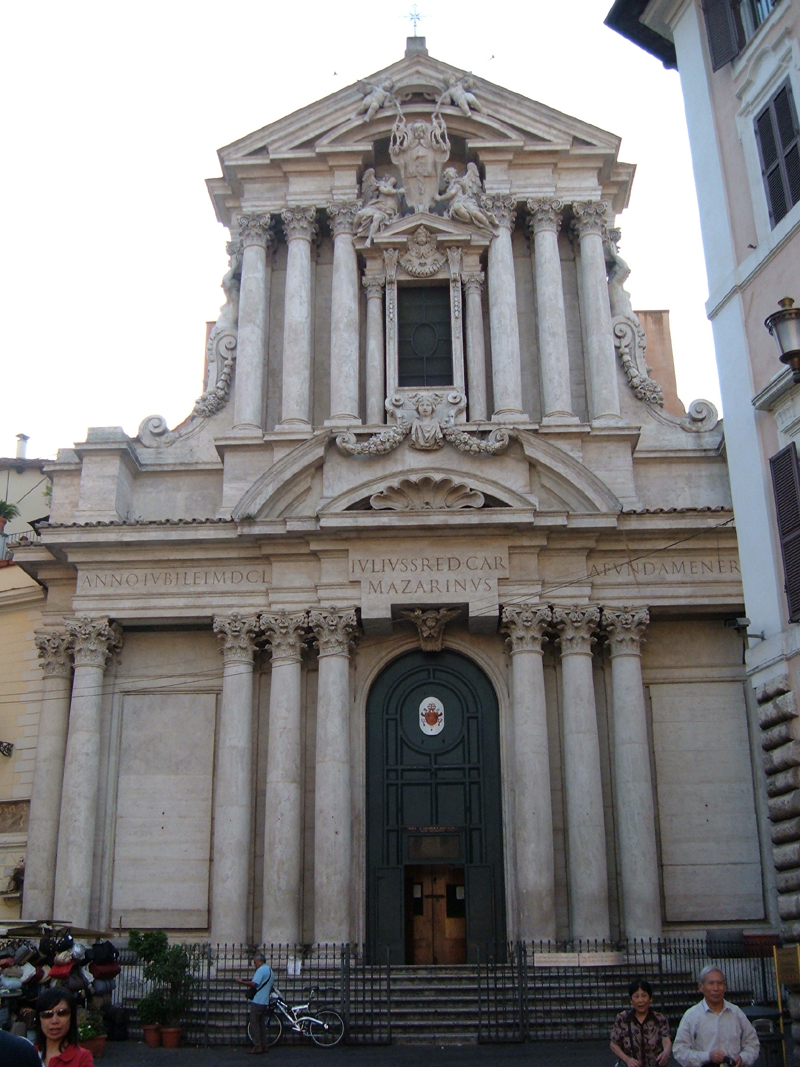
The Bulgarian Orthodox parish of Saints Cyril and Methodius in Rome occupies the Baroque church of Santi Vincenzo e Anastasio a Trevi by the Trevi Fountain.

== History ==
In the early 7th century AD, groups of Bulgars, one of the ancient peoples that participated in the ethnogenesis of the modern Bulgarians, settled in the Italian Peninsula. The main migration was headed by Altsek, a Bulgar leader who initially joined the Avar Khaganate before switching allegiance to the Germanic Lombards. Altsek and his people arrived in the Exarchate of Ravenna, where Grimoald I of Benevento invited them to populate the Duchy of Benevento. According to the Gesta Dagoberti I regis Francorum, Altsek's Bulgars settled in what are today the communes of Isernia, Bojano and Sepino. Altsek remained the leader of the Bulgar-populated areas, bearing the title gastald.

It is uncertain whether this Altsek can be identified with another Bulgar lord, Altsiok. According to the Chronicle of Fredegar, Altsiok deserted the Avar Khaganate in 631–632. Altsiok settled in Bavaria with 9,000 Bulgars under Frankish king Dagobert I. Altsiok is known to have moved to the Venetian March with his 700 remaining men after Dagobert I slaughtered most of his people.

Paul the Deacon in his Historia Langobardorum writing after the year 787 says that in his time Bulgars still inhabited the area, and that even though they speak "Latin," "they have not forsaken the use of their own tongue." In later times they had evidently become completely assimilated.

Human graves of a steppe nomadic character as well as horse burials dated to the second half of the 8th century AD attest to the presence of Bulgars in the Molise and Campania regions. Toponyms containing the root bulgar and personal names such as Bulgari and di Bulgari continued to appear in medieval documents relating to the Italian Peninsula.

In the 17th century, Bulgarian Roman Catholics often visited Rome in their attempts to negotiate support for a Bulgarian uprising against the Ottoman Empire. Prominent religious and public leaders such as Petar Bogdan and Petar Parchevich spent time in the city (see Chiprovtsi Uprising). The first book printed in modern Bulgarian, Abagar, was published in Rome in 1651.

== Cities with significant Bulgarian communities ==
Based on Demo Istat statistics

- Rome 1.828
- Milan 1.487
- Nettuno 834 (1,76%)
- Anzio 812 (1,47%)
- Cesena 796
- Naples 681
- Colleferro 489 (2,21%)
- Ravenna 442
- Ardea 412
- Genoa 318
- Pizzo 313 (3,38%)
- Monteroni di Lecce 301 (2,16%)
- Gambettola 300 (2,88%)

== Notable people ==
- Nikolay Diulgheroff (1901–1982), Futurist artist and designer
- Elena Nicolai (1905–1993), opera singer
- Boris Christoff (1914–1993), opera singer
- Nicolai Ghiaurov (1929–2004), opera singer
- Raina Kabaivanska (b. 1934), opera singer
- Hristo Zlatanov (b. 1976), Italy men's national volleyball team player
- Nikoleta Stefanova (b. 1984), table tennis player
- Vanessa Ferrari (b. 1990), world champion in artistic gymnastics
- Vencislav Simeonov (b. 1977), volleyball player
- Georgi Glouchkov (b. 1960), former professional basketball player
- Moni Ovadia (b. 1946), actor, singer and composer
- Ofelia Malinov (b.1996), Italian national team volleyball player
- Julieta Cantaluppi (b. 1985) rhythmic gymnast

== See also ==
- Bulgaria–Italy relations
- Bulgarian diaspora
- Immigration to Italy
- Celle di Bulgheria
