= Oratino =

- Comune
- Comune di Oratino
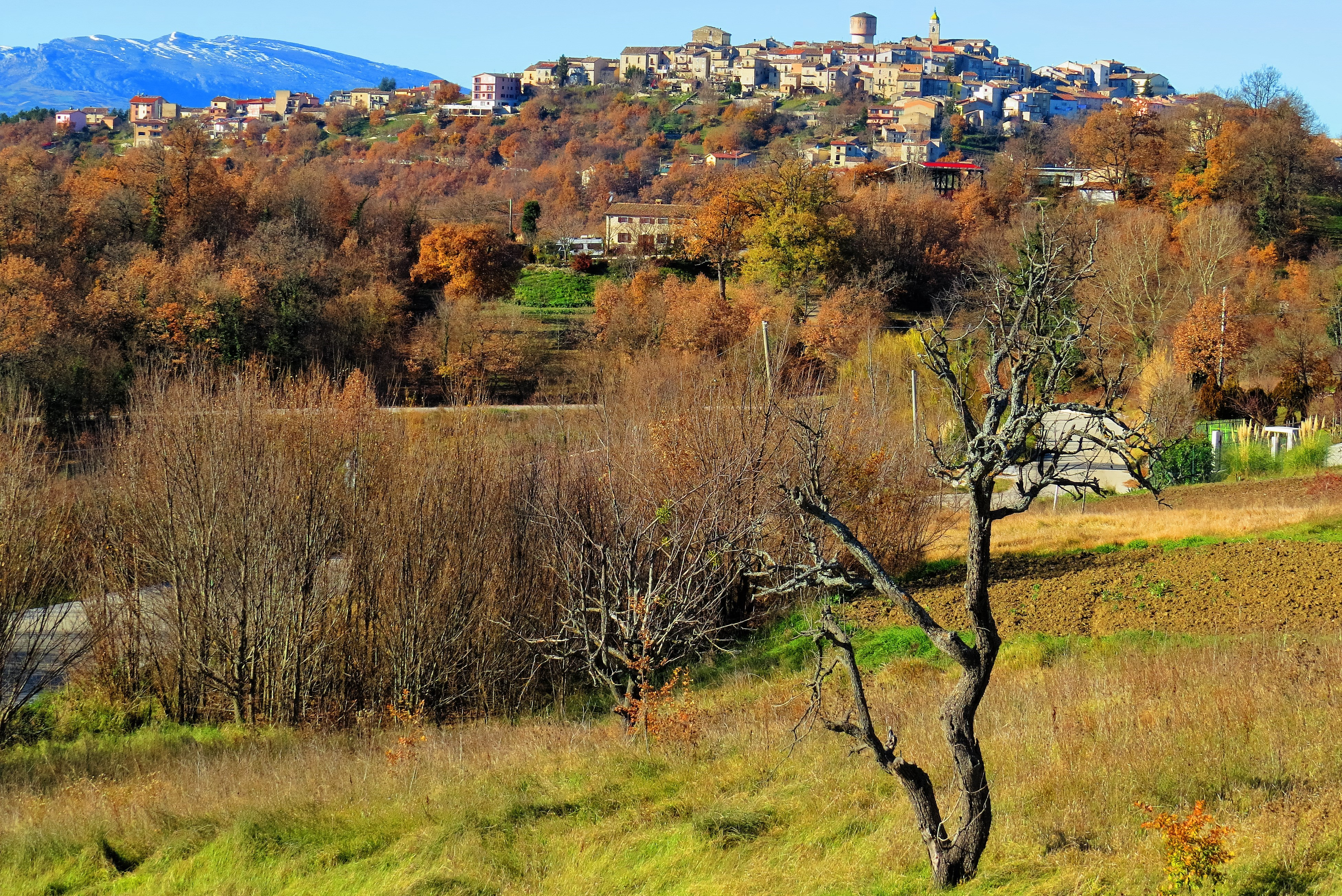

- Location within Italy Location within Molise
- Coordinates: 41°35′N 14°35′E
- Country: Italy
- Region: Molise
- Province: Province of Campobasso (CB)

Area
  - Total: 18.0 km^{2} (6.9 sq mi)
- Elevation: 789 m (2,589 ft)

Population (Dec. 2004)
  - Total: 1,326
  - Density: 73.7/km^{2} (191/sq mi)
- Time zone: UTC+1 (CET)
  - Summer (DST): UTC+2 (CEST)
- Postal code: 86010
- Dialing code: 0874
- Website: Official website

Oratino is a comune (municipality) in the Province of Campobasso in the Italian region Molise, located about 7 kilometres (4 mi) west of Campobasso. As of 31 December 2004, it had a population of 1,326 and an area of 18.0 square kilometres (6.9 mi^{2}).

Oratino borders the following municipalities: Busso, Campobasso, Castropignano, Ripalimosani. It is famous for its tradition of stonemasonry. It is one of I Borghi più belli d'Italia ("The most beautiful villages of Italy").

== Demographic evolution ==
Historical population

Year	Pop.	±%
1861	2,035	—
1871	2,089	+2.7%
1881	2,158	+3.3%
1901	2,344	+8.6%
1911	2,328	−0.7%

Year	Pop.	±%
1921	2,019	−13.3%
1931	1,734	−14.1%
1936	1,785	+2.9%
1951	1,760	−1.4%
1961	1,529	−13.1%

Year	Pop.	±%
1971	1,193	−22.0%
1981	1,130	−5.3%
1991	1,181	+4.5%
2001	1,289	+9.1%

Source: Data from ISTAT
