= Bulgaria–Italy relations =

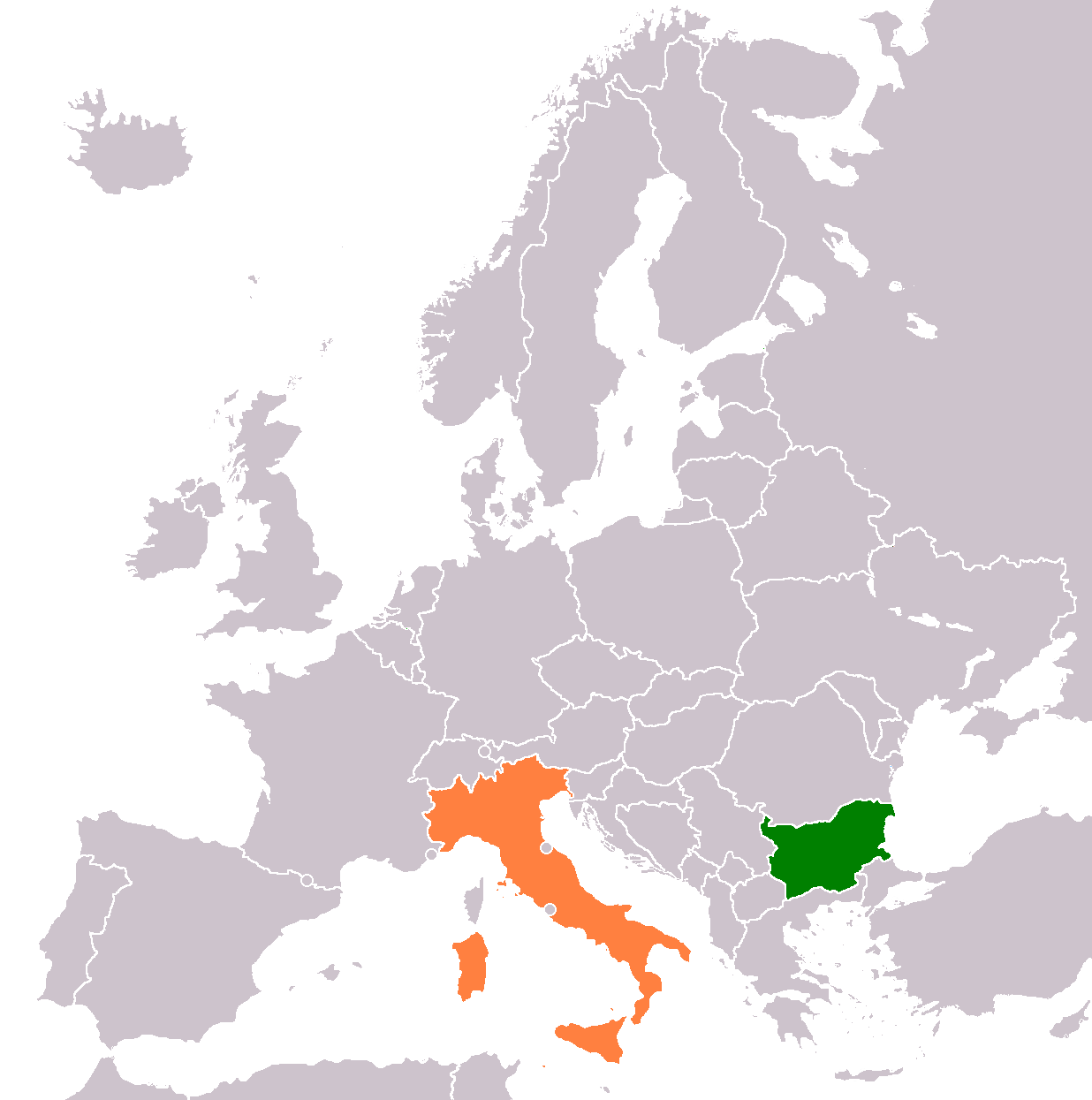

- Bulgaria: Italy

Bulgaria–Italy relations are foreign relations between Bulgaria and Italy. Both countries established diplomatic relations in 1879. Bulgaria has an embassy in Rome and a general consulate in Milan. Italy has an embassy in Sofia. Both countries are full members of the European Union, NATO, OSCE, Council of Europe and the World Trade Organization. Italy has given full support to Bulgaria's membership in the European Union and NATO.

== History ==
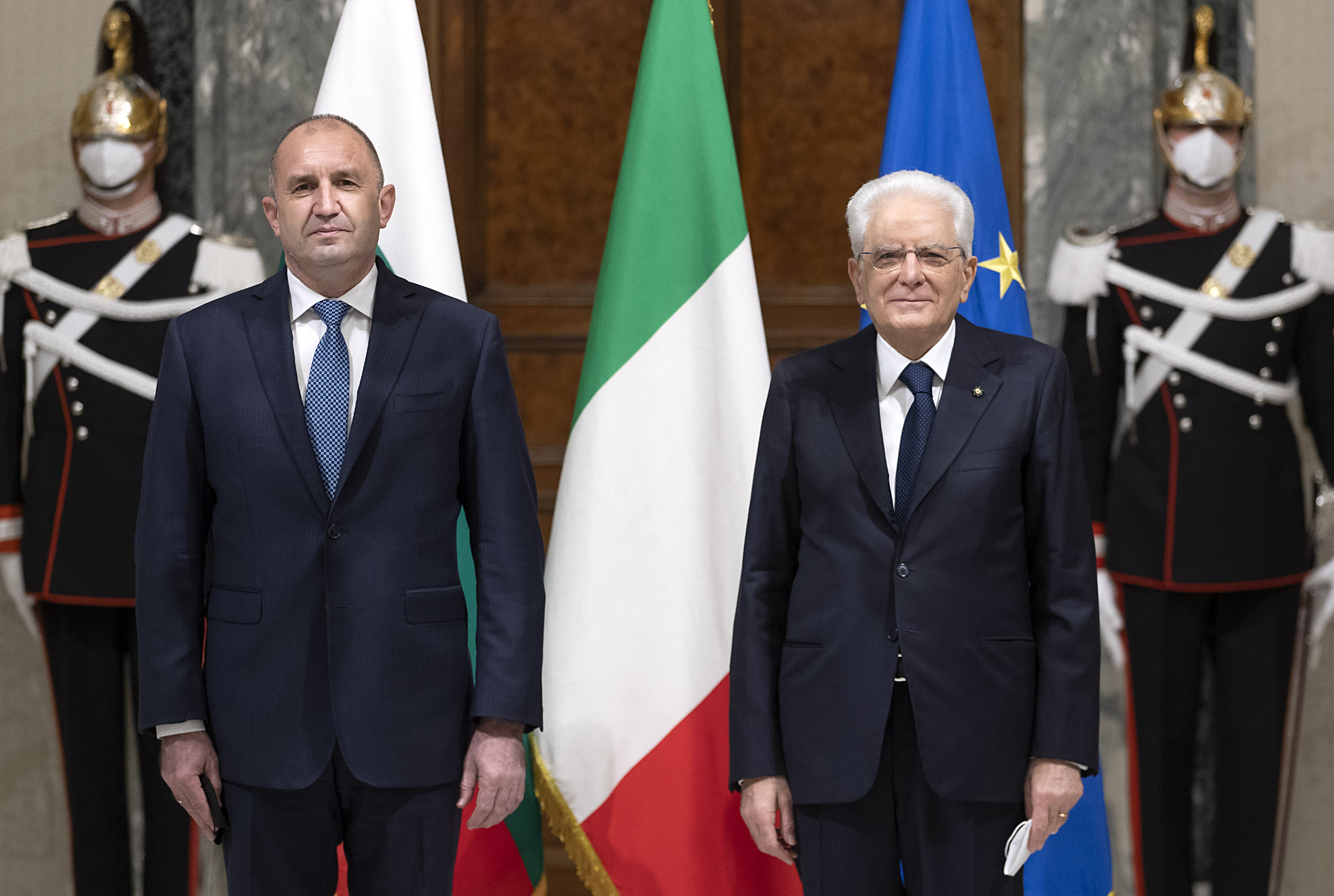
Meeting of President of Italy Sergio Mattarella and President of Bulgaria Rumen Radev in Rome in 2021

The territories of the modern nations of Bulgaria and Italy formed part of the ancient Roman Empire.

Troops from Bulgaria and the Italian states of Venice, Genoa and Savoy fought together as part of a larger European coalition at the Battle of Nicopolis in 1396 in an attempt to stop the Ottoman invasion of Bulgaria. In 1444, Bulgarian insurgents of Fruzhin and troops from the Italian Papal States fought together at the Battle of Varna, also as part of a larger European coalition, in an attempt to repel the Ottoman invasion of Europe and liberate the already conquered nations of Southeast Europe, including Bulgaria.

Both countries were members of the Axis powers during World War II, allies of Nazi Germany and the Empire of Japan, however both eventually switched allegiance to the Allies.

== Economic relations ==
Italy is one of Bulgaria's main trading partners. In 2019, Italy was the third largest source of imports and export destination for Bulgaria.

== International organizations ==
While Italy is a founding member of the EU and NATO, Bulgaria joined NATO in 2004 and the EU in 2007.

== Diplomatic missions ==
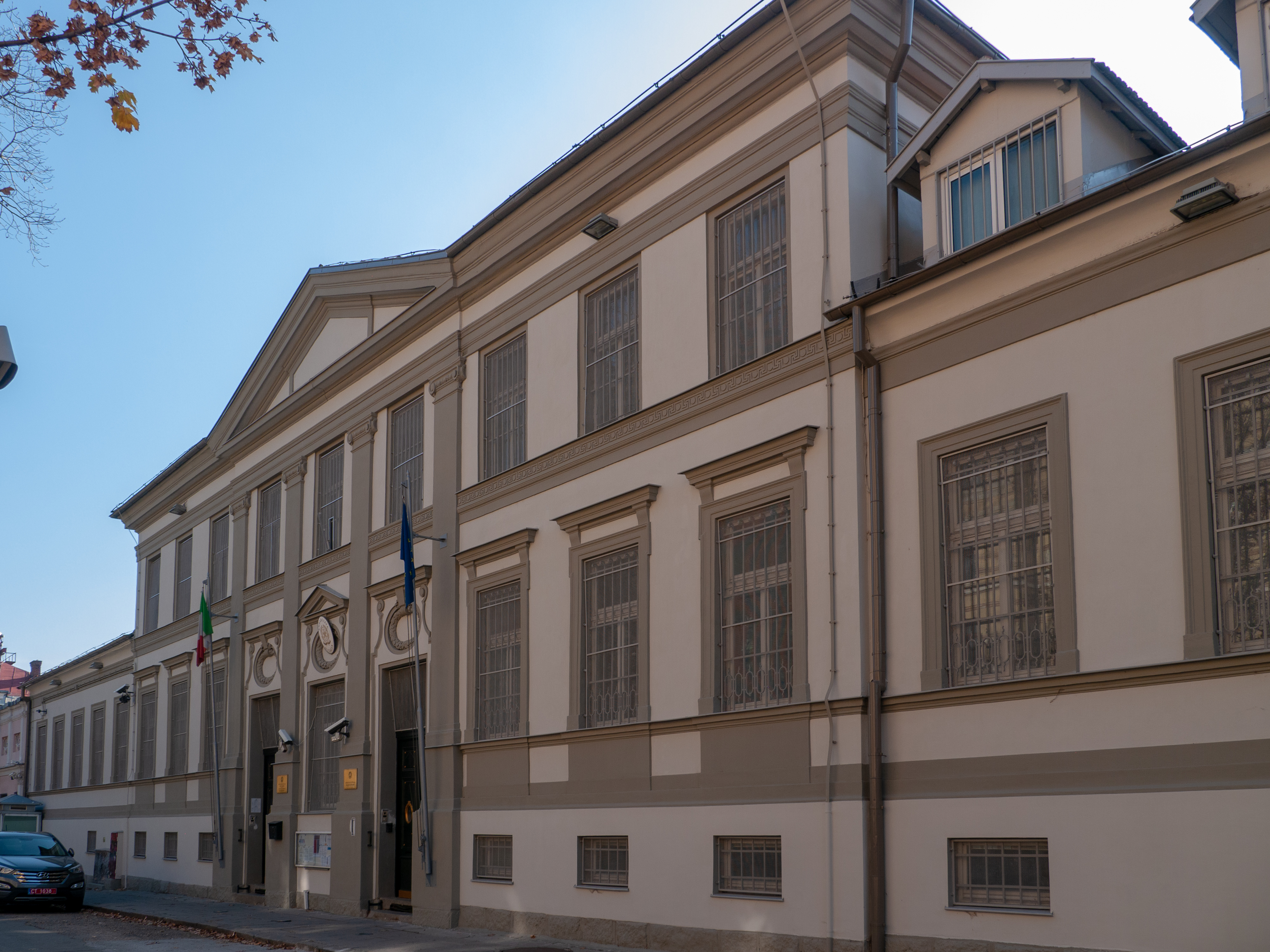
Embassy of Italy in Sofia

- Bulgaria has an embassy in Rome, a consulate-general in Milan, and honorary consulates in Ancona, Florence, Genoa, Naples, Turin and Treviso.
- Italy has an embassy in Sofia and honorary consulates in Plovdiv and Varna.

== See also ==
- Foreign relations of Bulgaria
- Foreign relations of Italy
- Bulgarians in Italy
