= Spinete =

- Comune
- Comune di Spinete
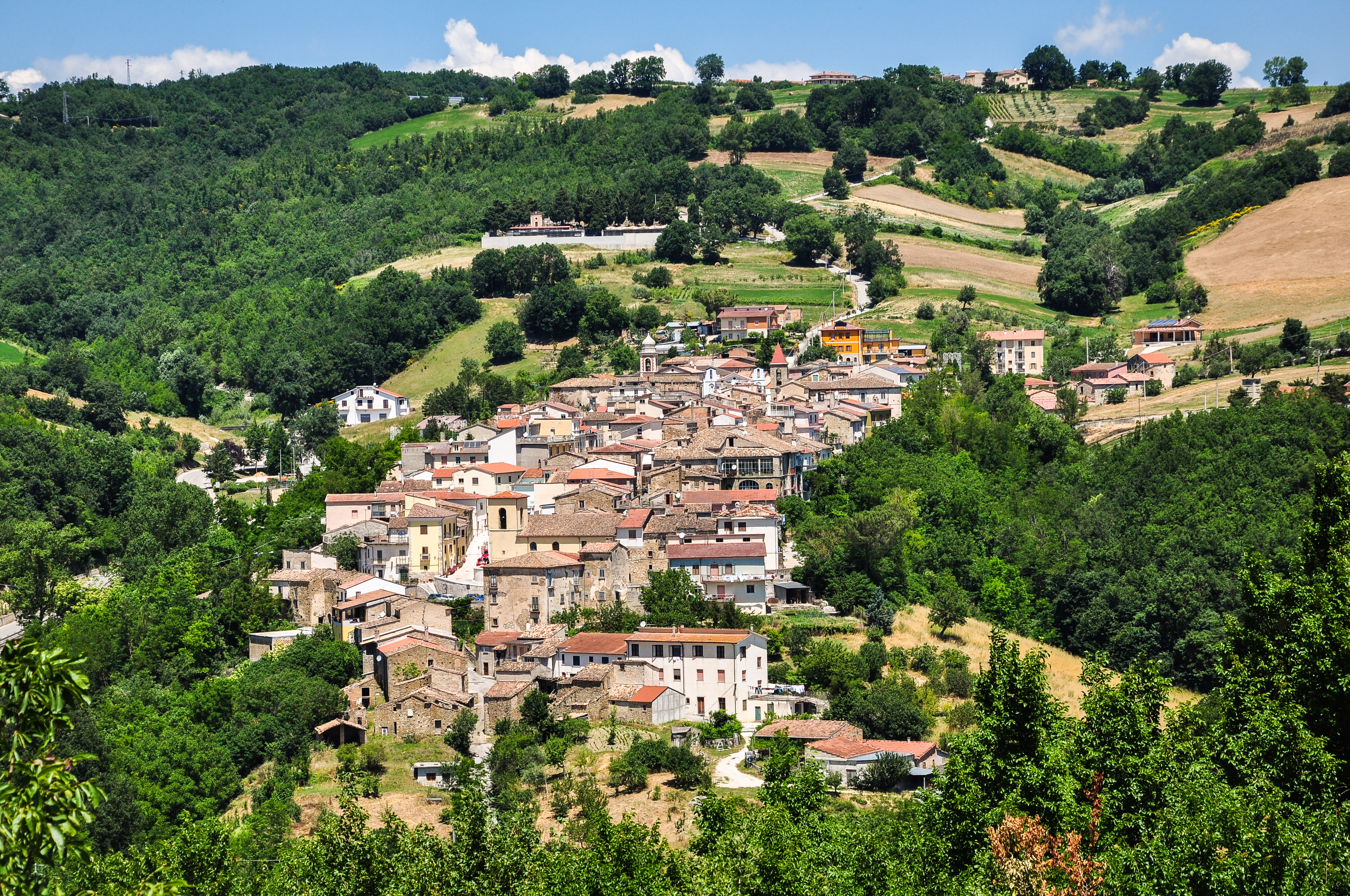
- View of Spinete

- Location within Italy Location within Molise
- Coordinates: 41°33′N 14°29′E
- Country: Italy
- Region: Molise
- Province: Campobasso (CB)

Government
  - Mayor: Andrea Romano

Area
  - Total: 17.83 km^{2} (6.88 sq mi)
- Elevation: 600 m (2,000 ft)

Population (30 November 2017)
  - Total: 1,256
  - Density: 70.44/km^{2} (182.4/sq mi)
- Demonym: Spinetesi
- Time zone: UTC+1 (CET)
  - Summer (DST): UTC+2 (CEST)
- Postal code: 86020
- Dialing code: 0874
- Patron saint: St. John
- Saint day: 24 June
- Website: Official website

Spinete is a comune (municipality) in the Province of Campobasso in the Italian region Molise, located about 15 kilometres (9 mi) west of Campobasso.

Spinete borders the following municipalities: Baranello, Bojano, Busso, Casalciprano, Colle d'Anchise, Sant'Elena Sannita.

== Friend towns ==
- Medicina, Italy
- Mahopac, United States
