= Roberto Gravina =

Italian politician (born 1977)

Member of the Regional Council of Molise
- Incumbent
- Assumed office 26 September 2023
- Constituency: Molise at-large

Mayor of Campobasso
- In office 11 June 2019 – 28 September 2023
- Preceded by: Antonio Battista
- Succeeded by: Marialuisa Forte

Personal details
- Born: 8 July 1977 (age 49) Rome, Italy
- Party: Five Star Movement
- Education: University of Molise
- Profession: Lawyer

Roberto Gravina (born 8 July 1977 in Rome) is an Italian politician and lawyer.

== Career ==
Gravina ran for the office of mayor of Campobasso with the Five Star Movement (M5S) at the 2019 Italian local elections, and he was elected at the second round on 9 June. He took office on 11 June 2019. He is the M5S–Italian centre-left candidate for president of Molise in the 2023 Molise regional election. He lost to Francesco Roberti and was elected to the Regional Council.

Political offices
Preceded by Antonio Battista	Mayor of Campobasso; 2019–2023	Succeeded by Marialuisa Forte
