= Vencislav Simeonov =

Bulgarian-Italian volleyball player (born 1977)

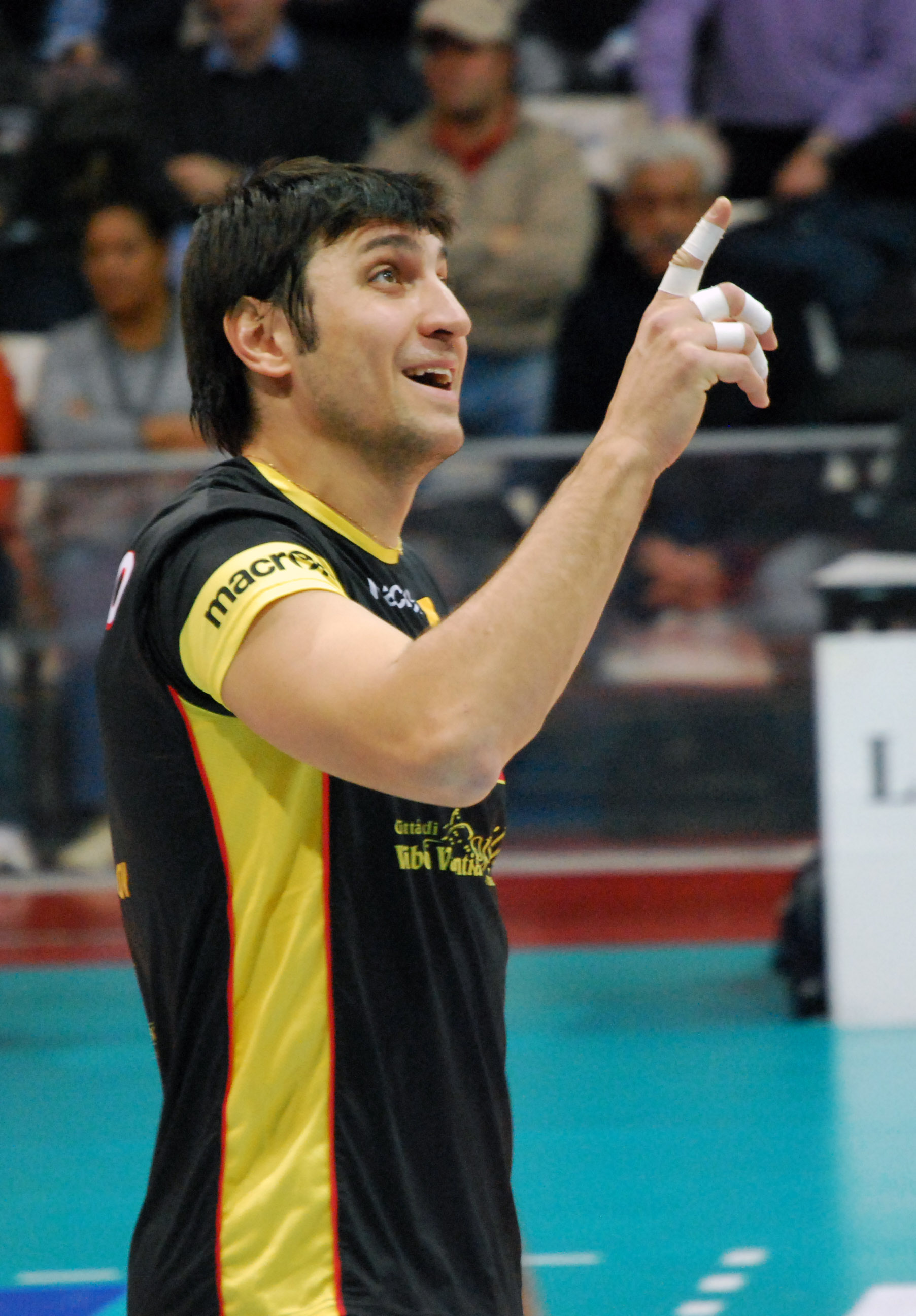

Medal record

Men's volleyball

Representing Italy

Olympic Games
Silver medal – second place	2004 Athens	Team competition

Vencislav Simeonov (Bulgarian: Венцислав Симеонов, born February 3, 1977, in Plovdiv) is a Bulgarian-Italian volleyball player with a height 200 cm and a weight of 105 kg, playing as opposite-hitter. He was born in Bulgaria. He was a member of the Italy men's national team that won the silver medal at the 2004 Summer Olympics in Athens, Greece. He played on final of Men's CEV Champions League 2007–08 for Copra Piacenza.

== Personal life ==
Simeonov is the son of Kaspar Simeonov, who has played on the Bulgaria national team.

== Career ==
- 1996–1998 ITA Alpitour Cuneo
- 1998–1999 ITA Caffe Motta Salerno
- 1999–2000 ITA Della Rovere Carifano
- 2000–2002 ITA Montichiari
- 2002–2003 ITA Bre Banca Lannutti Cuneo
- 2003–2005 ITA Edilbasso & Partners Padova
- 2005–2008 ITA Copra Berni Piacenza
- 2008–2012 ITA Tonno Callipo Vibo Valentia
- 2012–2014 GER VfB Friedrichshafen
- 2014– ROU C.V.M. Tomis Constanța

== Historical Standings ==
- 1996 Italian Supercup
- 1996 European Supercup
- 1997 Cup Winners Cup
- 1998 Cup Winners Cup
- 2000 Italian Cup A2
- 2002 Italian Supercup
- 2006 CEV Top Teams Cup
- 2008 vice champion of CEV Champions League and Italian Volleyball League

=== State awards ===
- 2004 Officer's Order of Merit of the Italian Republic
