= Baranello =

- Comune
- Comune di Baranello
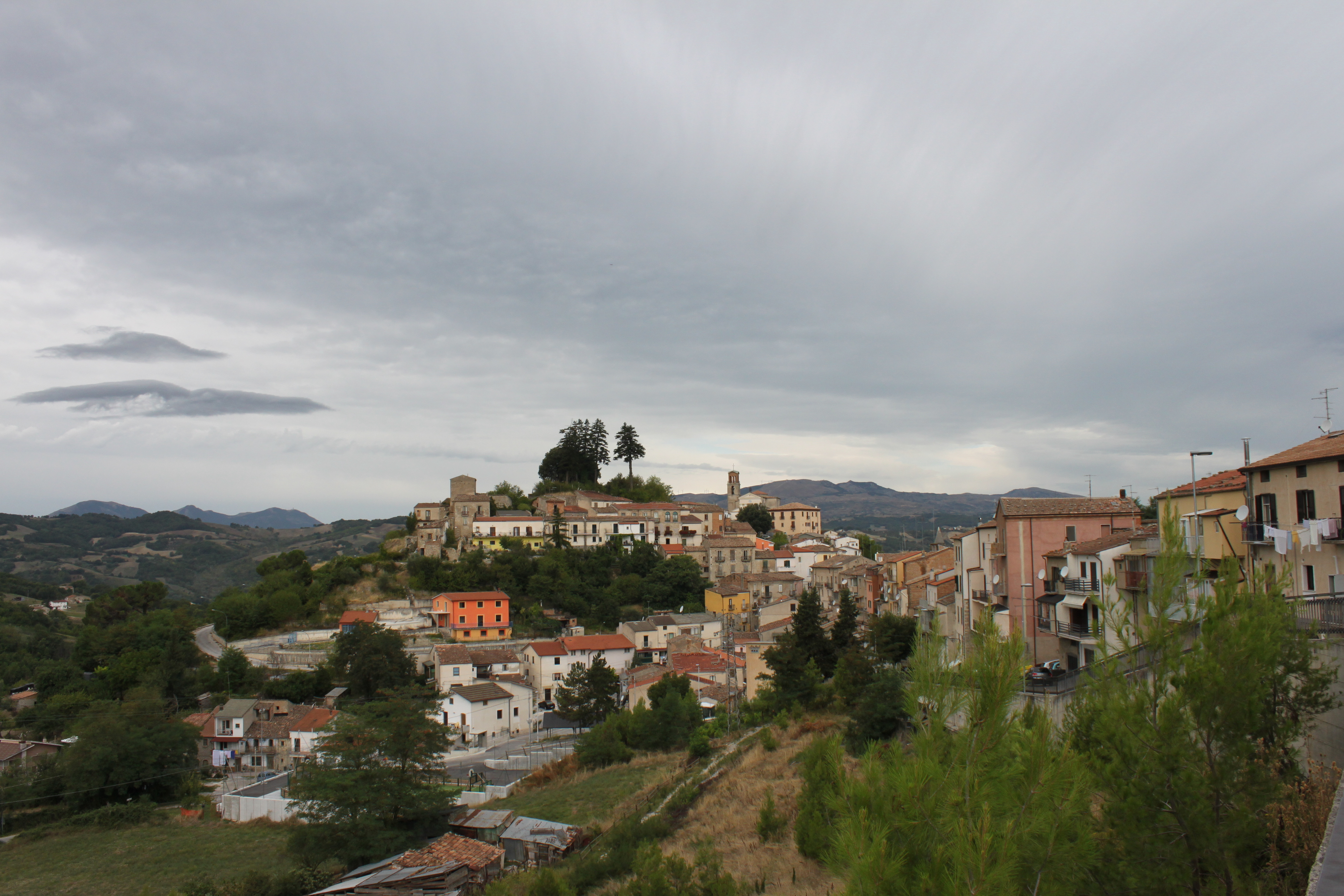
- View of Baranello

- Location within Italy Location within Molise
- Coordinates: 41°32′N 14°33′E
- Country: Italy
- Region: Molise
- Province: Campobasso (CB)

Government
  - Mayor: Marco Maio

Area
  - Total: 24.8 km^{2} (9.6 sq mi)
- Elevation: 610 m (2,000 ft)

Population (30 November 2017)
  - Total: 2,620
  - Density: 106/km^{2} (274/sq mi)
- Demonym: Baranellesi
- Time zone: UTC+1 (CET)
  - Summer (DST): UTC+2 (CEST)
- Postal code: 86011
- Dialing code: 0874
- Website: Official website

Baranello is a comune (municipality) in the Province of Campobasso in the Italian region Molise, located about 10 kilometres (6 mi) southwest of Campobasso. This town draws its name as a derivative of Monte Vairano which was a hilltop Samnite village and now is an archeological site.

Baranello borders the following municipalities: Busso, Colle d'Anchise, Spinete, Vinchiaturo.

== History ==
The oldest traces of Baranello go back to the 11th century.

In WW2, Baranello was occupied by the German forces.

== People ==
- Piero Niro, Italian composer and classical pianist, was born in Baranello.
