= San Polo Matese =

- Comune
- Comune di San Polo Matese
- Coat of arms

- Location within Italy Location within Molise
- Coordinates: 41°28′N 14°30′E
- Country: Italy
- Region: Molise
- Province: Campobasso (CB)

Government
  - Mayor: Tonino Spina

Area
  - Total: 17.7 km^{2} (6.8 sq mi)
- Elevation: 751 m (2,464 ft)

Population (Dec. 2004)
  - Total: 485
  - Density: 27.4/km^{2} (71.0/sq mi)
- Demonym: Sanpolesi
- Time zone: UTC+1 (CET)
  - Summer (DST): UTC+2 (CEST)
- Postal code: 86020
- Dialing code: 0874
- Patron saint: St. Nicholas
- Saint day: 6 December

San Polo Matese is a comune (municipality) in the Province of Campobasso in the Italian region Molise, located about 20 kilometres (12 mi) southwest of Campobasso.

San Polo Matese borders the following municipalities: Bojano, Campochiaro, Colle d'Anchise, San Gregorio Matese.
