= Vinchiaturo =

- Comune
- Comune di Vinchiaturo
- Location within Italy Location within Molise
- Coordinates: 41°30′N 14°35′E
- Country: Italy
- Region: Molise
- Province: Campobasso (CB)

Government
  - Mayor: Luigi Valente

Area
  - Total: 35.5 km^{2} (13.7 sq mi)
- Elevation: 620 m (2,030 ft)

Population (31 December 2010)
  - Total: 3,185
  - Density: 89.7/km^{2} (232/sq mi)
- Demonym: Vinchiaturesi
- Time zone: UTC+1 (CET)
  - Summer (DST): UTC+2 (CEST)
- Postal code: 86019
- Dialing code: 0874
- Website: Official website

Vinchiaturo is a comune (municipality) in the Province of Campobasso in the Italian region Molise, located about 10 kilometres (6 mi) southwest of Campobasso with a population of 3368 people (31-12-2022).

== History ==
The name of the town derives from the Latin vincula catenis, meaning "prison with chains".

The town was already existing during the year 1000 "anno mille" and was depending on the monastery of Santa Maria di Monteverde.

In 1349 the city was devastated by an earthquake, which resulted in its displacement from Monteverde further downstream. A subsequent earthquake in 1805 destroyed the town, which was rebuilt in the Umbertine style, particularly the neoclassical church of Santa Croce.

During the era of Fascist Italy, Vinchiaturo was the site of a small fascist internment camp administered and operated by the province of Campobasso. It was a women-only camp located in a private house and could only hold less than 50 people. For the most part, the camp housed foreign women from Russia, Poland, and Hungary, along with what were categorized as "foreign Jews" and "former Yugoslavs". Some of the women were described as prostitutes. Overcrowding was a serious problem and at least two suicide attempts were recorded. The camp remained in operation until September 1943, just after the Armistice of Cassibile, at which point the people were freed.

=== City Coat ===
The city's coat of arms was recognized by decree of the head of government on March 18, 1936.

Vinchiaturo borders the following municipalities: Baranello, Busso, Campobasso, Campochiaro, Colle d'Anchise, Guardiaregia, Mirabello Sannitico, San Giuliano del Sannio.
