= Casalciprano =

- Comune
- Comune di Casalciprano
- Location within Italy Location within Molise
- Coordinates: 41°35′N 14°32′E
- Country: Italy
- Region: Molise
- Province: Campobasso (CB)

Government
  - Mayor: Eliseo Castelli

Area
  - Total: 19.0 km^{2} (7.3 sq mi)
- Elevation: 662 m (2,172 ft)

Population (30 November 2017)
  - Total: 533
  - Density: 28.1/km^{2} (72.7/sq mi)
- Demonym: Cipranensi
- Time zone: UTC+1 (CET)
  - Summer (DST): UTC+2 (CEST)
- Postal code: 86010
- Dialing code: 0874
- Website: Official website

Casalciprano is a comune (municipality) in the Province of Campobasso in the Italian region Molise, located about 11 kilometres (7 mi) west of Campobasso.

Casalciprano borders the following municipalities: Busso, Castropignano, Frosolone, Sant'Elena Sannita, Spinete, Torella del Sannio.
