= Sepino =

- Comune
- Comune di Sepino
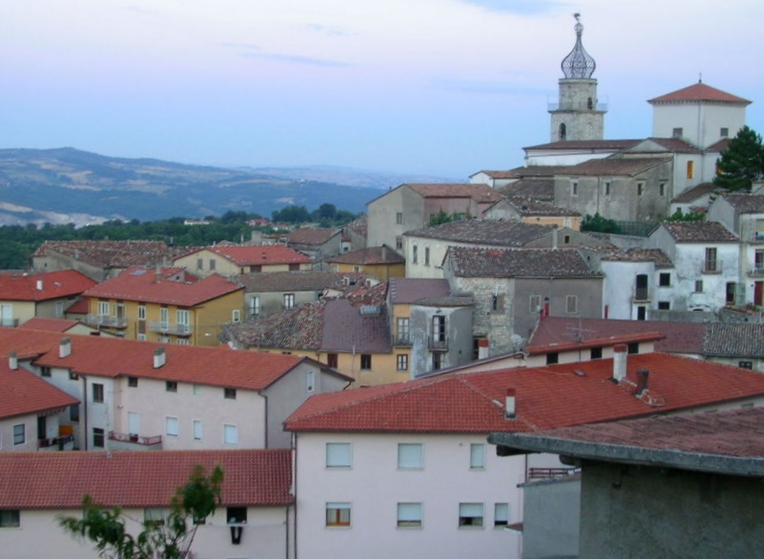
- View of Sepino

- Coat of arms

- Location within Italy Location within Molise
- Coordinates: 41°24′N 14°37′E
- Country: Italy
- Region: Molise
- Province: Campobasso (CB)

Government
  - Mayor: Paolo Pasquale D'Anello

Area
  - Total: 61.37 km^{2} (23.70 sq mi)
- Elevation: 698 m (2,290 ft)

Population (30 November 2017)
  - Total: 1,915
  - Density: 31.20/km^{2} (80.82/sq mi)
- Demonym: Sepinesi
- Time zone: UTC+1 (CET)
  - Summer (DST): UTC+2 (CEST)
- Postal code: 86017
- Dialing code: 0874
- Website: Official website

Sepino is a comune (municipality) in the Province of Campobasso in the Italian region Molise, located about 20 kilometres (12 mi) south of Campobasso. It is one of I Borghi più belli d'Italia ("The most beautiful villages of Italy").

The archaeological site of Saepinum is located nearby. Sepino borders the following municipalities: Cercemaggiore, Cercepiccola, Guardiaregia, Morcone, Pietraroja, San Giuliano del Sannio, Sassinoro.

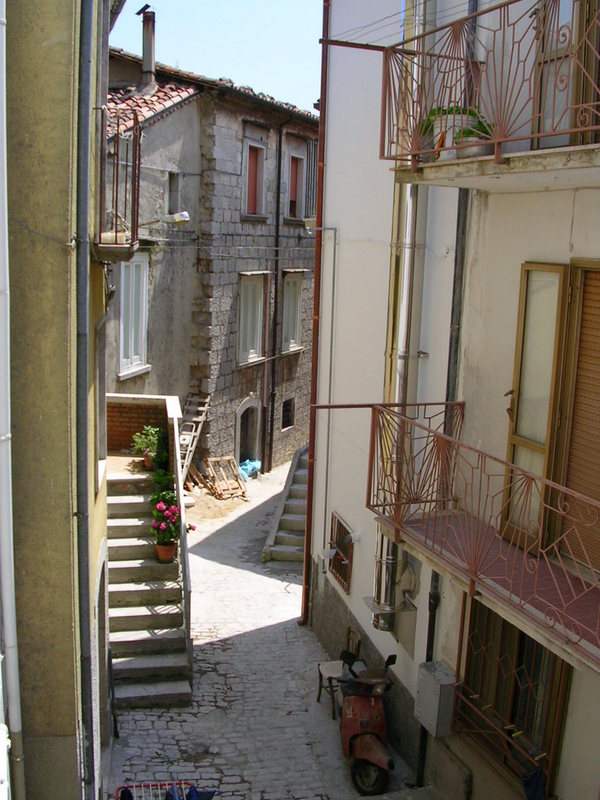
A sidestreet in Sepino

In the early 7th century AD, what are today the communes of Sepino, Isernia and Bojano were the places where Grimoald I of Benevento settled a group of Bulgars, seeking refuge from the Avars; the Bulgars were for many generations a distinctive part of the population, until finally assimilated in their Italian environment (see Bulgarians in Italy, Old Great Bulgaria#Bulgars in Southern Italy).

Beginning in the late 19th century, many residents of Sepino have immigrated to other countries. The earliest waves migrated to the United States (particularly Hartford) and Argentina, and after World War II many moved to Canada, Australia, Brazil, Uruguay, Venezuela, and other European countries besides Italy, namely Belgium and West Germany.
