= Castello Monforte =

- Campobasso, Molise, Italy
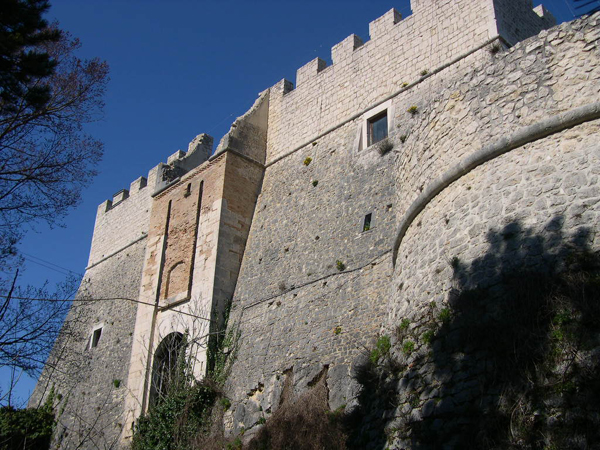

Site information
- Type: Castle
- Open to the public: Yes

Location
- Coordinates: 41°33′49.03″N 14°39′18.97″E

The Castello Monforte is a castle and defensive complex in Campobasso, Italy. It is located on a hill overlooking the city. The complex also houses the Campobasso Monforte meteorological station and the Chiesa di Santa Maria Maggiore.

== History ==
The origin of the castle is disputed. Some authors date the castle to 1459, built for Count Nicola II dei Monforte-Gambatesa-also known as Cola Monforte. Other authors date the castle to Norman times; a document from 1375 mentions a castle there.

After the castle suffered damage during the earthquake of 1456, Cola Monforte refurbished the castle and surrounding structures and erected walls. During the 17th century, the castle was abandoned and began to deteriorate. In the 19th century, it was used as a temporary cemetery. In 1861, the castle was bought by the city of Campobasso.

In 2022, the Italian Order of Architects criticized the city of Campobasso for not involving directly the Order in the redevelopment project of the castle.

== Gallery ==
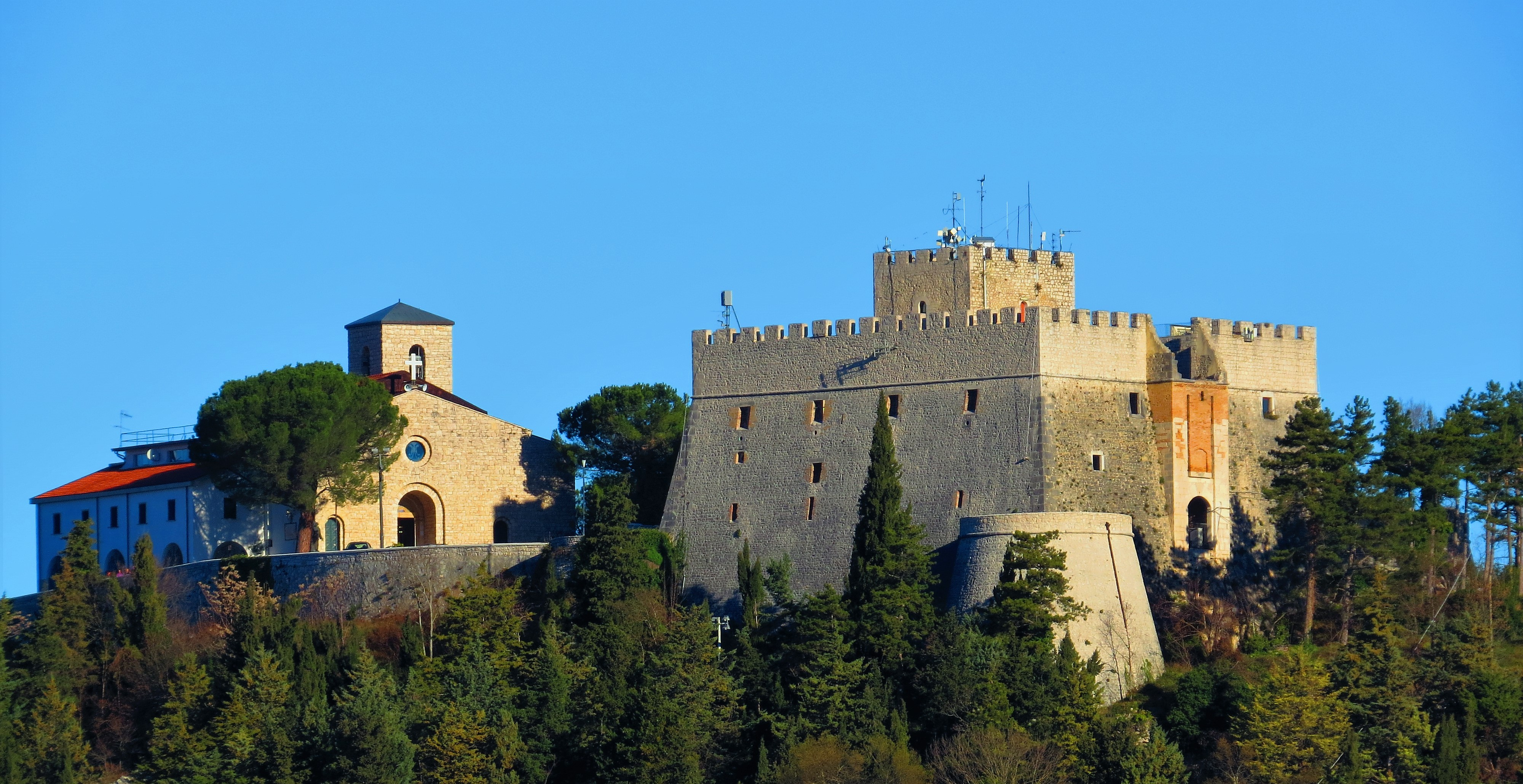
View of the Castello Monforte and Chiesa di Santa Maria Maggiore

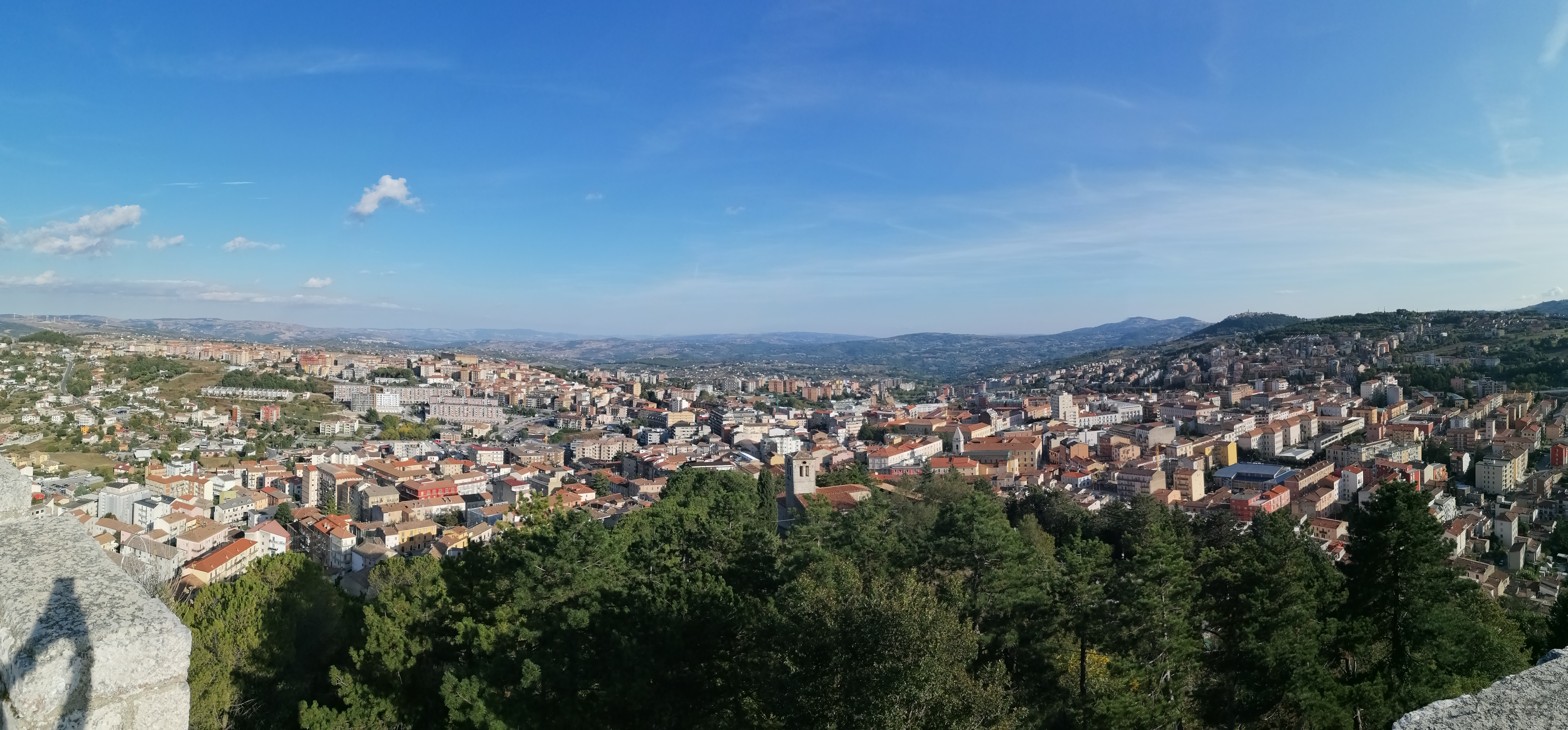
View of Campobasso from the castle

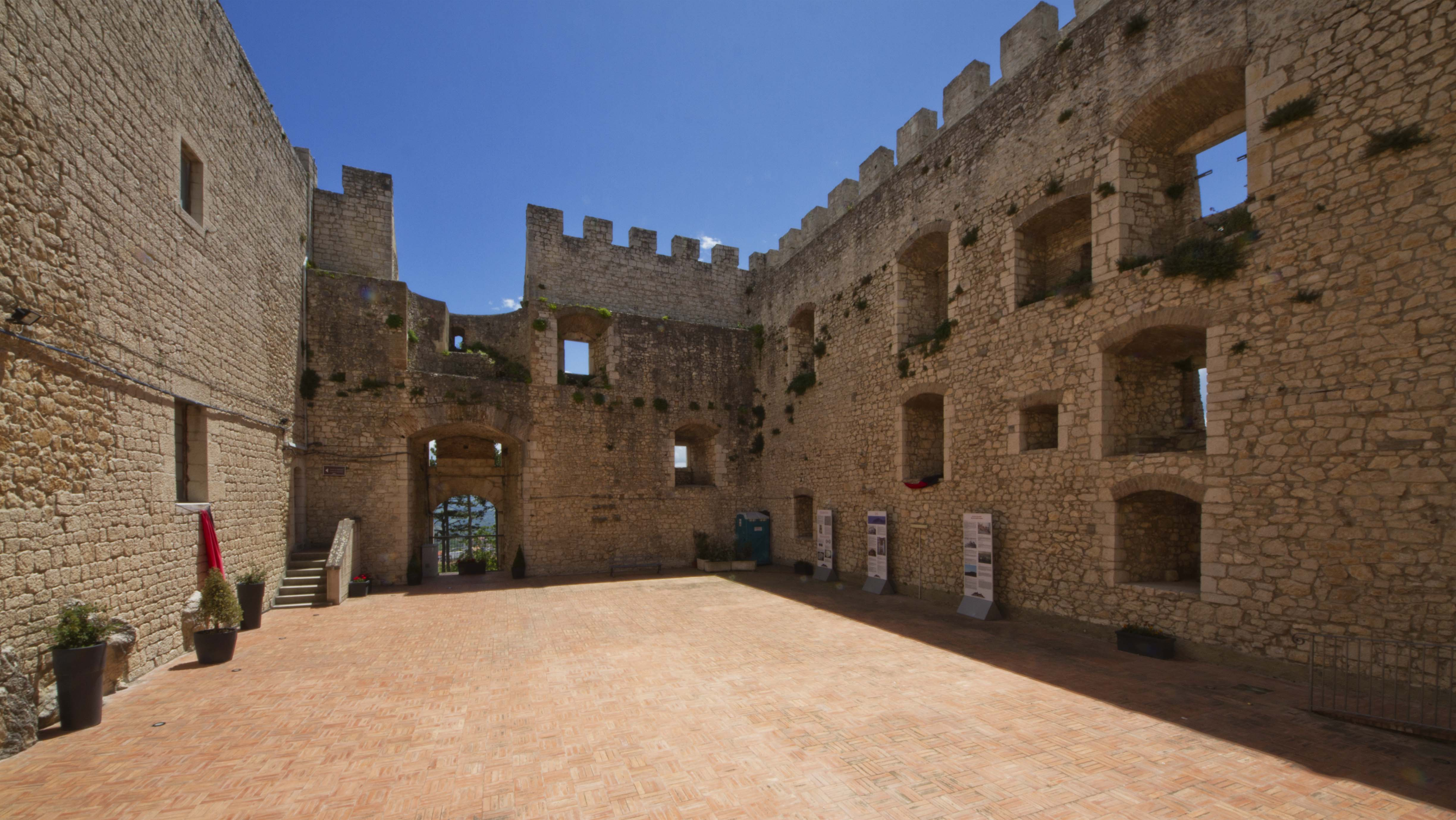
Castle interior

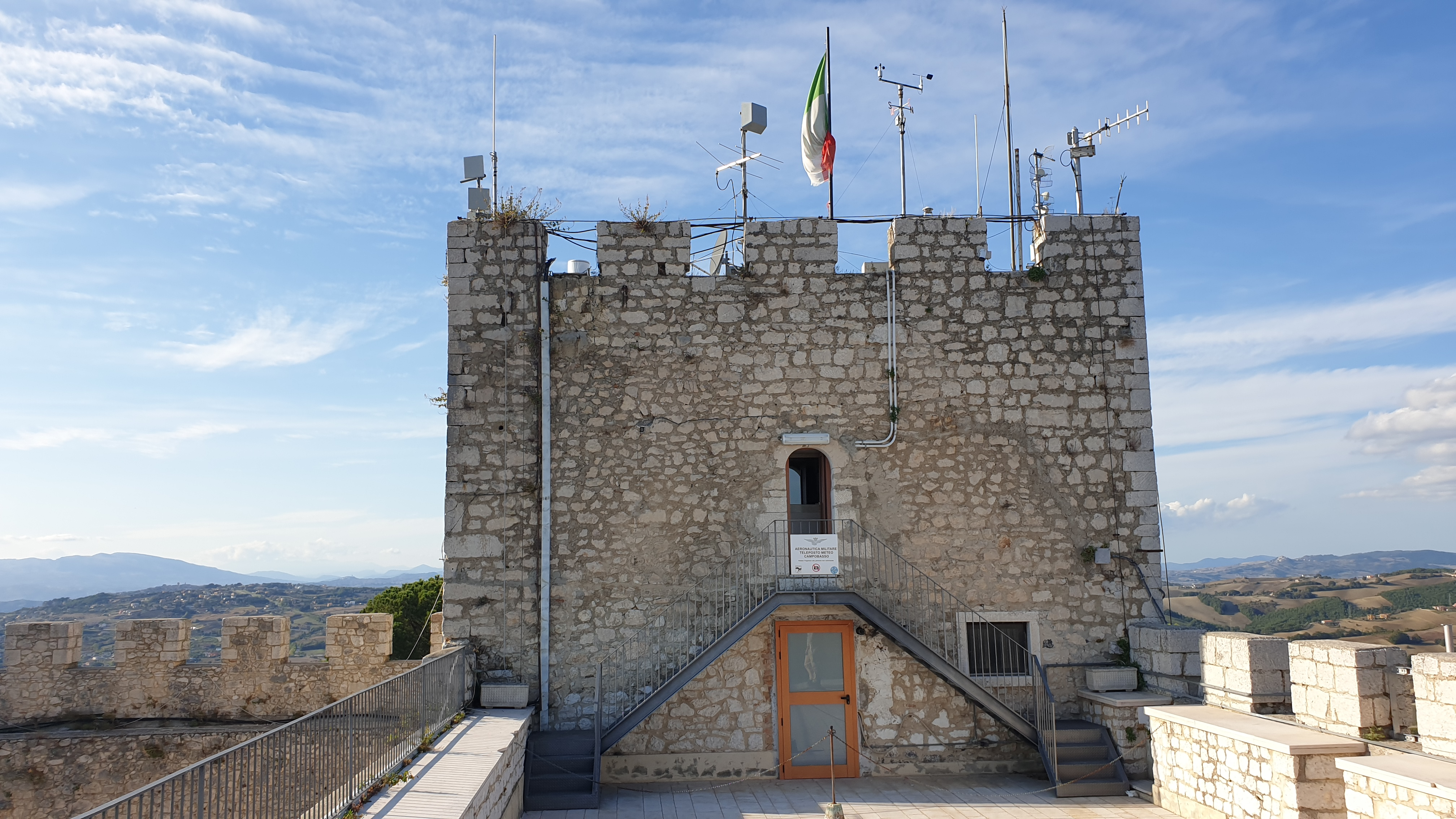
The meteorological station on top of the castle
