= Colle d'Anchise =

- Comune
- Comune di Colle d'Anchise
- Location within Italy Location within Molise
- Coordinates: 41°31′N 14°31′E
- Country: Italy
- Region: Molise
- Province: Campobasso (CB)

Government
  - Mayor: Carletto Di Paola

Area
  - Total: 15.8 km^{2} (6.1 sq mi)
- Elevation: 649 m (2,129 ft)

Population (31 December 2010)
  - Total: 813
  - Density: 51.5/km^{2} (133/sq mi)
- Demonym: Colledanchisani
- Time zone: UTC+1 (CET)
  - Summer (DST): UTC+2 (CEST)
- Postal code: 86020
- Dialing code: 0874
- Website: Official website

Colle d'Anchise is a comune (municipality) in the Province of Campobasso in the Italian region Molise, located about 14 kilometres (9 mi) southwest of Campobasso.

Colle d'Anchise borders the following municipalities: Baranello, Bojano, Campochiaro, San Polo Matese, Spinete, Vinchiaturo.
