= Busso =

- Comune
- Comune di Busso
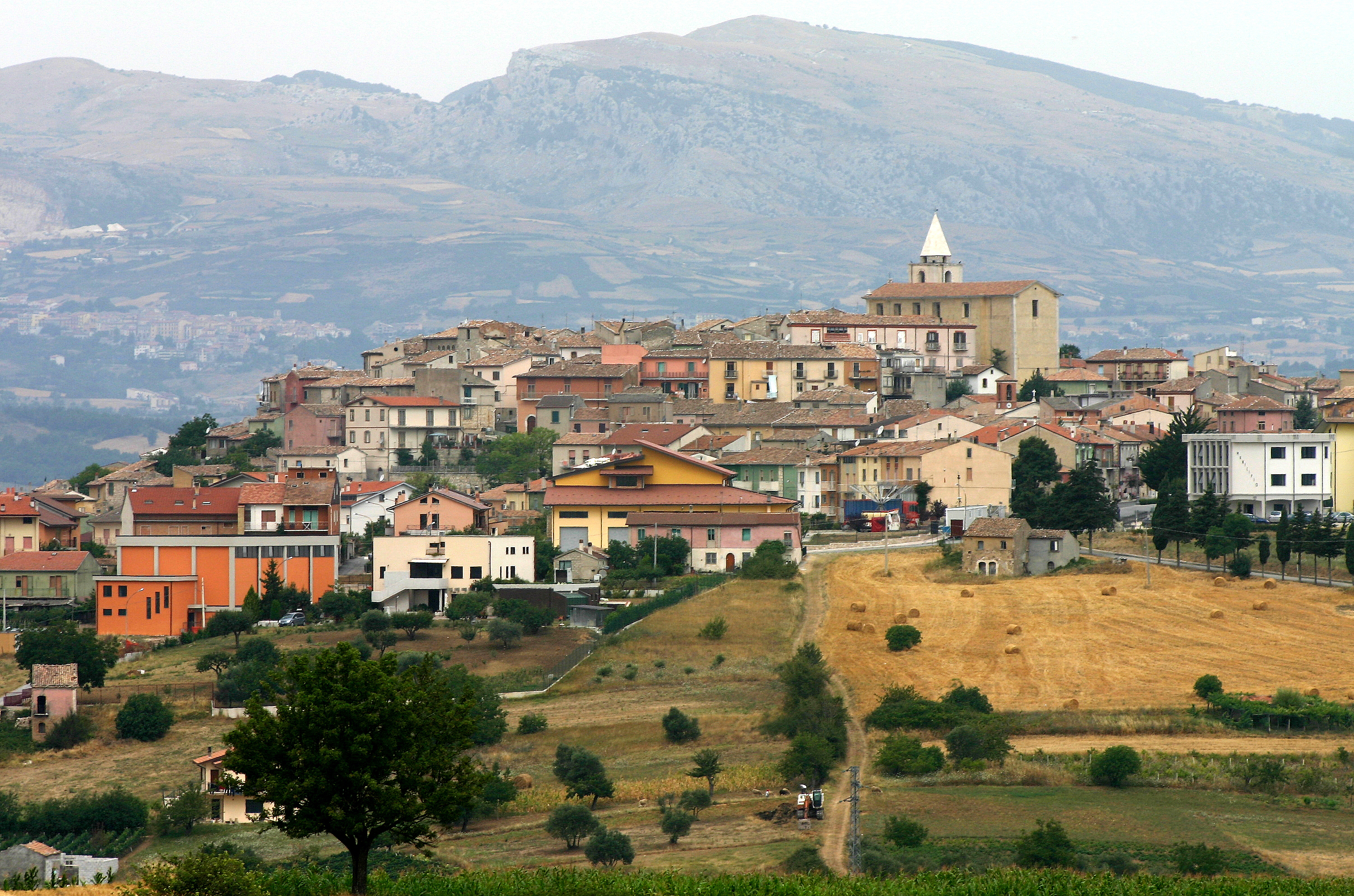

- Location within Italy Location within Molise
- Coordinates: 41°33′N 14°33′E
- Country: Italy
- Region: Molise
- Province: Campobasso (CB)

Government
  - Mayor: Michele Palmieri

Area
  - Total: 23.81 km^{2} (9.19 sq mi)
- Elevation: 756 m (2,480 ft)

Population (30 November 2017)
  - Total: 1,216
  - Density: 51.07/km^{2} (132.3/sq mi)
- Demonym: Bussesi
- Time zone: UTC+1 (CET)
  - Summer (DST): UTC+2 (CEST)
- Postal code: 86010
- Dialing code: 0874
- Patron saint: Saint Lawrence
- Saint day: August 10
- Website: Official website

Busso is a comune (municipality) in the Province of Campobasso in the Italian region Molise, located about 10 kilometres (6.2 mi) west of Campobasso.

Busso borders the following municipalities: Baranello, Campobasso, Casalciprano, Castropignano, Oratino, Spinete, Vinchiaturo.
