= Mirabello Sannitico =

- Comune
- Comune di Mirabello Sannitico
- Panorama of Mirabello Sannitico

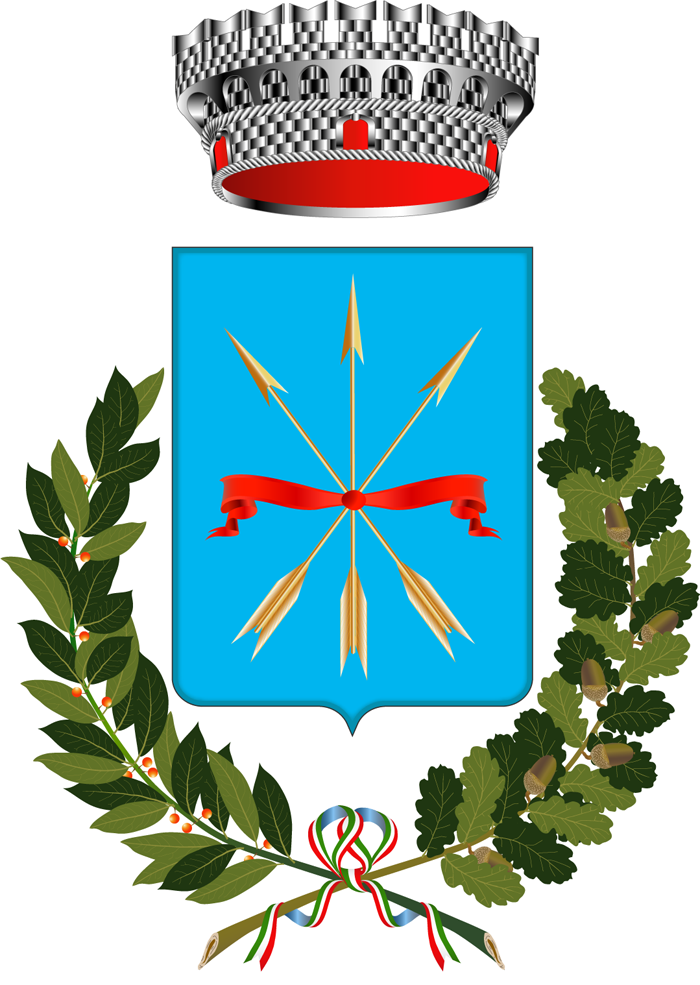
- Coat of arms

- Location within Italy Location within Molise
- Coordinates: 41°31′N 14°40′E
- Country: Italy
- Region: Molise
- Province: Campobasso (CB)

Government
  - Mayor: Angelo Miniello

Area
  - Total: 21.43 km^{2} (8.27 sq mi)
- Elevation: 600 m (2,000 ft)

Population (30 November 2017)
  - Total: 2,132
  - Density: 99.49/km^{2} (257.7/sq mi)
- Demonym: Mirabellesi
- Time zone: UTC+1 (CET)
  - Summer (DST): UTC+2 (CEST)
- Postal code: 86010
- Dialing code: 0874
- Patron saint: St. George
- Saint day: April 23
- Website: Official website

Mirabello Sannitico is a small town in the province of Campobasso, Molise, southern Italy. The population is about 2,100 inhabitants. It has an agrarian-based culture and history, dating back to at least the 12th century. Nearby towns include Campobasso to the northwest and Vinchiaturo to the southwest. The Tappino River flows on either side of the town on the north and south.

== History ==
=== The Samnites Pentri ===
In the 4th century BC, the central Apennine mountain region was largely settled by the Samnite people. This area was more precisely referred to as Samnium (Italian: Sannio). An offshoot of the Sabines, the oldest written record of the Samnites comes from a treaty with the Romans in 354 BC. The territory was organized as a confederation of four major tribes: the Hirpini, Caudini, Caraceni, and Pentri. The Pentri tribe was located in the center of Samnium, with its capital city being Bovianum (modern day Bojano). Mirabello Sannitico today lies only 10 miles northeast of the site, suggesting that any early inhabitants belonged to the powerful tribe. The scattered populace of the Samnites are a product of ver sacrum, a Sabine tradition that forced tribal members into colonization of unsettled land.

De Sanctis links Mirabello Sannitico to the Samnites in his book on the origins of the nearby town of Ferrazzano, citing scattered remains of Italic settlements and polygonal Samnite walls in the locale of La Rocca. This has led some to identify the site with conquest of the city of Ruffrium, an ancient Samnite town just 2 miles from modern Mirabello Sannitico. Ruffrium was conquered multiple times by the Romans, initially in 326 BC during the Second Sannite War; Livy wrote:

"Three towns fell into their hands, Allifæ, Callifæ, and Ruffrium; and the adjoining country to a great extent was, on the first arrival of the consuls, laid entirely waste" (Livy, VIII. 25) .

However, the Romans lost control soon after in 310 BC:

"During these transactions in Etruria the other Consul CM. Rutilus took Allifæ by storm from the Samnites, and many of their forts and smaller towns were either destroyed or surrendered uninjured" (Livy, IX. 38).

The battles culminated three years later in 307 BC:

"The proconsul Quintus Fabius fought near the city Allifæ a pitched battle with the army of the Samnites. The victory was complete, the enemy were driven from the field and pursued to their camp; and they could not have held the camp had there not been very little daylight left... guards were posted in the night to prevent anyone's escaping. The next day, before it was well light, they began to surrender. The Samnites among them bargained to be dismissed in their tunics; all these were sent under the yoke.The allies of the Samnites... sold into slavery, to the number of seven thousand. Those who gave themselves out for Hernic citizens were detained apart in custody, and Fabius sent them all to the senate in Rome. There an enquiry was held as to whether they had been conscripted or had fought voluntarily for the Samnites against the Romans; after which they were parceled out amongst the Latins to be guarded." (Livy, IX. 42)

While it is unknown when exactly the first inhabitants of Mirabello Sannitico came to be, it seems unlikely any settlement would have survived these battles. Any early occupants could have been those Livy mentioned in "the adjoining country" during the first raids that were "laid to waste", the "forts and smaller towns [that] were either destroyed or surrendered" in the Samnite counterattack, or the "enemy... driven from the fields" that were "sold into slavery" in Quintus Fabuis's final assault. Some claim that, after the Romans destroyed Ruffrium in the bloody battle, the population moved away and founded another village, called Mirum Bellum; meanwhile, the Romans built a tower used as a fortress for political prisoners on the ruins of the old town. De Sanctis writes that it was the Romans themselves who called the site "Mirum Bellum", combined with Sanniti (Italian for Samnites) from which the current toponym Mirabello Sannitico is derived.

=== The Lombards and Bulgars ===
In 571, the Lombards introduced a feudal system in the area from foreign countries. The neighboring municipalities of Isernia and Sepino were colonized by the Bulgars (also called "Vulgars"), as recorded by the Lombard Paolo Diacono in his Historia Langobardorum writing in c. 787. The steward (a less important title than Duke) Alcek was tied to Molise and Paolo Diacono, which may suggest Bulgarian presence in the area as early as the 670s. Further evidence of Bulgarian occupancy is found in the necropoli of Vicenneand Morrione, where tombs of soldiers buried with their horses were found (a practice common in the Hungarian plane but rare in Western Europe). Alcek (also known as Alzeco or Alzecone) mainly served as the territorial administrator for the Duchy of Benevento and was not as concerned with profiting from the feudal establishment.

=== The Normans - present ===
Mirabello Sannitico was surrounded by the Saracen attacks propagating throughout Italy from the mid-9th century to 11th centuries. In 1053, Rodolfo di Moulins led the attack on nearby Bojano, then-capital of the Duchy of Benevento, establishing Norman rule over the region. Moulins belonged to the Hauteville family (Italian: Altavilla), who controlled most of the area in that time from the Norman conquest of Southern Italy. In 1058, the Abbot Luzio commissioned an expansion of the monastery of Santa Maria di Monteverde. This contributed to the population growth Mirabello was experiencing, and by 1095 the town had been mentioned as an urban entity dependent upon the Norman Bojano (or Boiano).

The oldest written reference to the town appears in a church register in February 1193, where the abbot Ferulfo mentions the church of Saint Salvator of Mirabello (whose location and ruins are now lost), adjacent to the Tappino river. Numerous bloody battles were fought over water rights for the land between Mirabello Sannitico and Ferrazzano. Many earthquakes have historically plagued the area. This region suffered large earthquakes in 847, 1294, 1309. Other temblors struck in 1456, 1587, 1688 (no deaths, as the quake occurred when most were in the fields) and 1794. On July 26, 1805 an earthquake struck the area that killed nearly 6,000 people in Molise and 300 in Mirabello and turned a previously damaged church, San Nicola, to rubble.

== Main sights ==
The town is laid out in a classic medieval fashion, with a radial array of streets surrounding the principal church, Santa Maria Assunta in Cielo. The earliest known reference to the church is in an ecclesiastical inventory of Bojano diocese of August 20, 1241, executed by the notary, Guglielmo, under Giovanni Capuano of Naples, on order from Emperor Fredrick II of Svevia. Other churches include Holy Maria of the Assumption (Santa Maria di Annuziata), San Rocco, San Giorgio, and in the nearby hills, Santa Maria di Monteverde. Stone town walls and huge arches are readily appreciated. The principal street, so named as in nearly all Italian towns, via Roma, in accord with a 1930s decree by Mussolini changed from via San Nicola leads from the main piazza abutted by the main church and leads out of town. The relics of this history remains with a statuary of Saint Nicholas in the wall at the end of via Roma and vici named San Nicola II and III. At the end of via Roma lies an ancient well, where the cap stones have numerous deeply carved vertical grooves due to centuries of hauling water with buckets and ropes.

== Culture ==
The townspeople observe many feast days, celebrating in traditional style with parades, religious processions, and fireworks. The most elaborate celebration is for the feast of Saint George, the patron saint of the town. It is celebrated on 23 April. Others include the feast of Saint Joseph (19 March), Saint Anthony (June 13), Ferragosto (15 August), and Epiphany (early January) as well as Christmas and Easter. Many inhabitants still make their own wine; preserve tomatoes; make olive oil, and slaughter a pig shortly after Christmas (ritualistically imitating centuries of forebears who did the same to provide meat throughout the coming year).

Emigrants from this town are scattered throughout the world. From about 1880 to 1925 many settled in New York City, Philadelphia and Cleveland. After World War II emigration to Canada, Switzerland, and South America was more common.
