= Guardiaregia =

- Comune
- Comune di Guardiaregia
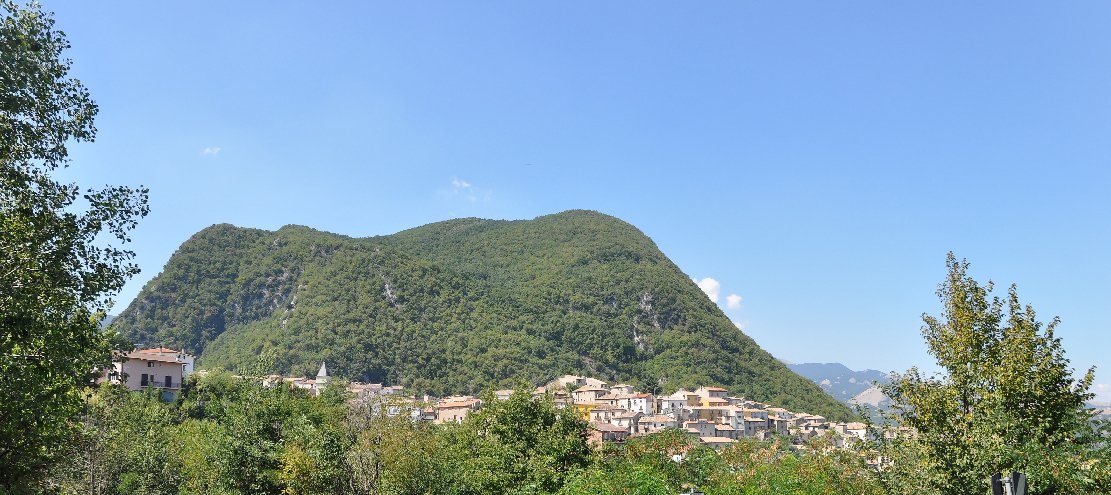
- Guardiaregia skyline

- Coat of arms

- Location within Italy Location within Molise
- Coordinates: 41°26′N 14°33′E
- Country: Italy
- Region: Molise
- Province: Campobasso (CB)

Government
  - Mayor: Fabio Iuliano

Area
  - Total: 43.71 km^{2} (16.88 sq mi)
- Elevation: 730 m (2,400 ft)

Population (30 November 2017)
  - Total: 783
  - Density: 17.9/km^{2} (46.4/sq mi)
- Demonym: Guardioli
- Time zone: UTC+1 (CET)
  - Summer (DST): UTC+2 (CEST)
- Postal code: 86014
- Dialing code: 0874
- Patron saint: St. Nicholas
- Saint day: May 9
- Website: Official website

Guardiaregia is a small mountain town in the Province of Campobasso, Molise, southern Italy. Their patron saint is San Nicola di Bari, otherwise known as St. Nicholas.

== History ==
In ancient times it was a strongpoint of the Samnites, and was conquered by the Romans during the Samnite Wars (2nd century BC). Later it received the rights of a municipium.

The current settlement dates from the medieval Lombard Duchy of Benevento, when a castle was built here to protect Campochiaro.

In 1805 the town was hit with a sizable earthquake that destroyed (literally swallowed) the castle there in a chasm that opened as the ridge split from the mountain to which it was once attached.

That event was the principal cause of emigration from the city and today, "Piazza Toronto" (Toronto Plaza) stands in commemoration of those who sent aid and support to those who rebuilt the town. There was a vast number of immigrants to Canada and the United States during the Second World War. In Toronto there is a large community of Guardiaregians, and a Guardiaregia picnic is held annual.
