= Campobasso =

City in Molise, Italy

Campobasso Cambuàsce (Neapolitan)
- Comune
- Comune di Campobasso
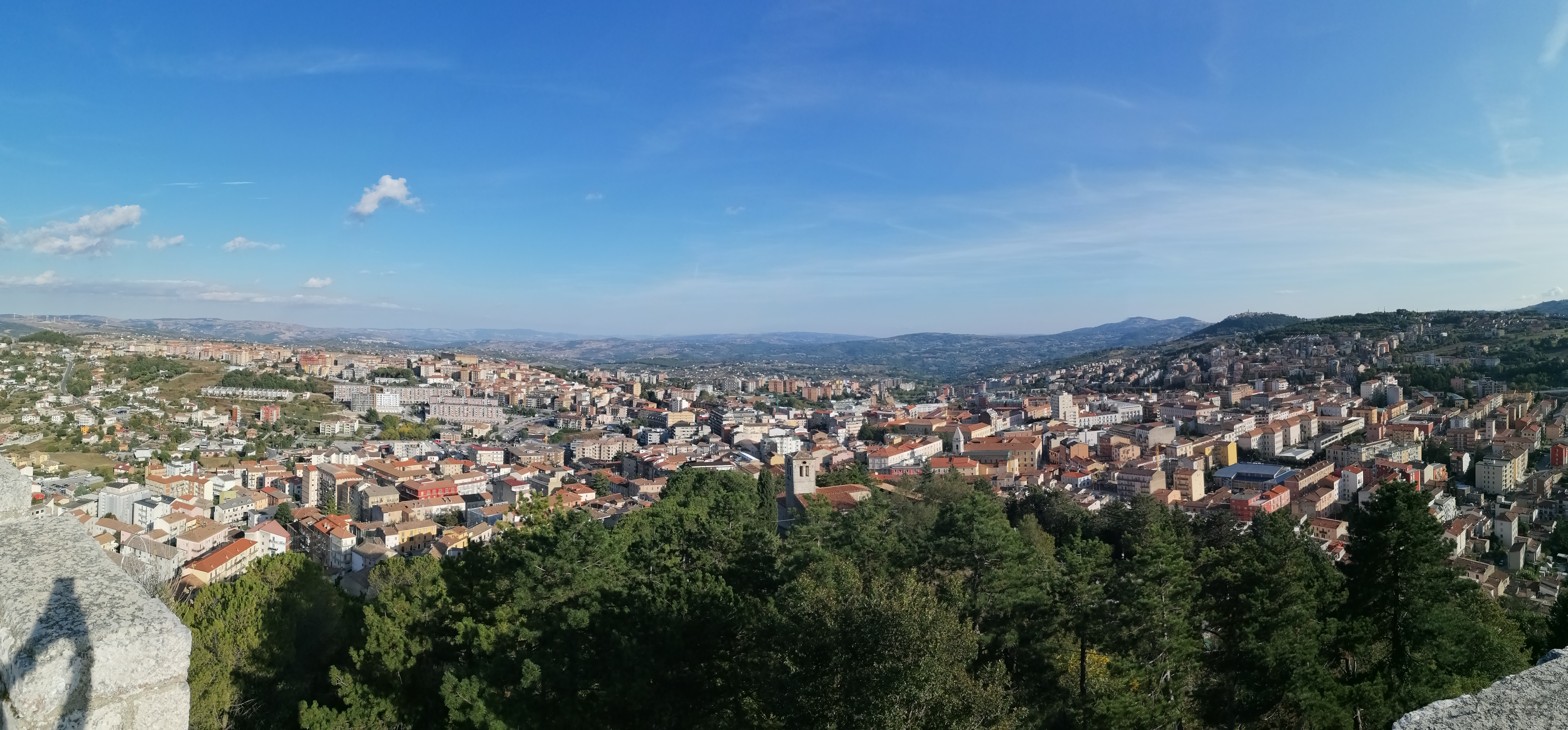
- Panoramic view of Campobasso

- Flag Coat of arms

- Location within Molise Location within Italy Location within Europe
- Coordinates: 41°33′37″N 14°39′42″E
- Country: Italy
- Region: Molise
- Province: Campobasso (CB)
- Frazioni: Santo Stefano

Government
  - Mayor: Marialuisa Forte (centre-left)

Area
  - Total: 56.11 km^{2} (21.66 sq mi)
- Elevation: 701 m (2,300 ft)

Population (2026)
  - Total: 47,399
  - Density: 844.8/km^{2} (2,188/sq mi)
- Demonym: Campobassani
- Time zone: UTC+1 (CET)
  - Summer (DST): UTC+2 (CEST)
- Postal code: 86100
- Dialing code: 0874
- Patron saint: St. George
- Saint day: 23 April
- Website: Official website

Campobasso (UK: /ˌkæmpoʊˈbæsoʊ/, Italian: [ˌkampoˈbasso]; Campobassan: Cambuàsce [ˌkambuˈwaʃʃə]) is a city and comune (municipality) in southern Italy, the capital of the region of Molise and of the province of Campobasso. It is located in the high basin of the Biferno river, surrounded by the Sannio and Matese mountains. It has 47,399 inhabitants.

Campobasso is renowned for the craftsmanship of blades (including scissors and knives), a fact well documented since the 14th century. In the old part of the town there is a medieval castle, Castello Monforte. It is also famous for the scamorza and caciocavallo. The city is home to the University of Molise and the Archdiocese of Campobasso-Boiano.

== History ==
The origins of Campobasso are disputed. According to the most widely held theory, the city was founded by the Lombards before the 8th century as a fortified camp on the slope of the hill where the castle stands. The original name was Campus vassorum, suggesting that the city was the seat of the vassals of the duke of Spoleto.

After the Norman conquest of Southern Italy, Campobasso lost its importance as a defensive stronghold, but became a significant trading and administration centre.

From 1330 to 1745 the city was ruled by the Monforte-Gambatesa family, who built the castle and established a mint. Later it came under the control of the Di Capua, Gonzaga, Vitagliano, Carafa and Romano families.

The original old town of Campobasso contains the Castello Monforte, although in 1732 the inhabitants built a new town on a lower-level plain. In 1763 the citizens abandoned the old city and settled in the lower valley. The current city was expanded in 1814 by the king of Naples Joachim Murat, and lies on the Campo Basso ("Low field").

Campobasso was the scene of heavy fighting during the Second World War. In the months of October and November 1943 a battle between the German and the Canadian troops for possession of the city caused the destruction of many public buildings, including the City Hall and the archives held there. Thirty eight civilians were killed in the action, including the bishop of the diocese, Bishop Secondo Bologna, and an unknown number of people were injured in the intensive bombardment. The occupation by the Canadian troops, and the administrative and political control resulting, had such an impact on the town that it became known as "Canada Town" or "Maple Leaf City".

In 1995 the city was awarded the bronze medal for Civil Valour in recognition of the hard work done in clearing the region of dangerous unexploded warheads, a task that lasted well into 1948.

== Geography ==
The region's largest city by population, it stands at 701 m above sea level (Monforte Castle is at 792 m).

Campobasso borders the municipalities of Busso, Campodipietra, Castropignano, Ferrazzano, Matrice, Mirabello Sannitico, Oratino, Ripalimosani, San Giovanni in Galdo, and Vinchiaturo.

=== Climate ===
Situated 701 metres (2,300 ft) above sea level and close to the Apennine Mountains, Campobasso is considered one of the coldest cities of central/southern Italy. It has an humid subtropical climate (Cfa) according to the Köppen climate classification, and an oceanic climate (Do) according to Trewartha climate classification, with an average temperature of about 13 °C (55 °F), with winter to summer ranging from 4 to 23 °C (39 to 73 °F) on average. During the winter, snowfalls are frequent. The wettest time of year is the autumn with about 77 millimetres (3.0 in) of rain each November.

Climate data for Campobasso (1991–2020)
Month	Jan	Feb	Mar	Apr	May	Jun	Jul	Aug	Sep	Oct	Nov	Dec	Year
Mean daily maximum °C (°F)	7.4 (45.3)	7.9 (46.2)	11.3 (52.3)	14.8 (58.6)	19.5 (67.1)	24.6 (76.3)	27.6 (81.7)	28.1 (82.6)	22.1 (71.8)	17.7 (63.9)	12.2 (54.0)	8.2 (46.8)	16.8 (62.2)
Daily mean °C (°F)	4.4 (39.9)	4.5 (40.1)	7.3 (45.1)	10.6 (51.1)	15.1 (59.2)	19.8 (67.6)	22.4 (72.3)	22.8 (73.0)	17.6 (63.7)	13.7 (56.7)	9.2 (48.6)	5.4 (41.7)	12.7 (54.9)
Mean daily minimum °C (°F)	2.0 (35.6)	1.7 (35.1)	4.2 (39.6)	7.1 (44.8)	11.2 (52.2)	15.6 (60.1)	18.1 (64.6)	18.5 (65.3)	14.2 (57.6)	10.7 (51.3)	6.7 (44.1)	3.2 (37.8)	9.4 (48.9)
Average precipitation mm (inches)	66.4 (2.61)	51.2 (2.02)	57.3 (2.26)	62.4 (2.46)	58.2 (2.29)	49.8 (1.96)	34.9 (1.37)	39.3 (1.55)	57.5 (2.26)	58.6 (2.31)	76.8 (3.02)	61.0 (2.40)	673.5 (26.52)
Average precipitation days (≥ 1.0 mm)	8.5	8.0	8.3	9.0	7.7	5.5	3.8	4.5	6.5	6.8	9.0	8.8	86.5
Average relative humidity (%)	76.7	73.9	70.4	67.3	66.7	62.4	58.3	59.0	67.7	72.9	77.5	78.2	69.2
Average dew point °C (°F)	0.5 (32.9)	−0.2 (31.6)	1.9 (35.4)	4.2 (39.6)	8.3 (46.9)	11.3 (52.3)	12.4 (54.3)	13.2 (55.8)	11.3 (52.3)	8.8 (47.8)	5.5 (41.9)	1.9 (35.4)	6.6 (43.9)
Mean monthly sunshine hours	157.8	156.5	186.6	207.9	245.2	265.5	296.7	287.7	219.9	183.8	149.7	140.7	2,498.1
Source: NOAA

== Demographics ==
Historical population
Year	Pop.	±%
1861	12,802	—
1871	14,311	+11.8%
1881	14,845	+3.7%
1901	14,724	−0.8%
1911	16,791	+14.0%
1921	16,413	−2.3%
1931	19,955	+21.6%
1936	22,525	+12.9%
1951	28,678	+27.3%
1961	34,011	+18.6%
1971	41,782	+22.8%
1981	48,291	+15.6%
1991	50,941	+5.5%
2001	50,762	−0.4%
2011	48,747	−4.0%
2021	47,587	−2.4%
Source: ISTAT

As of 2026, the population is 47,399, of which 48.7% are male, and 51.3% are female. Minors make up 12.9% of the population, and seniors make up 27.5%.

=== Immigration ===
As of 2025, immigrants make up 9.4% of the population. The 5 largest foreign countries of birth are Argentina, Romania, Venezuela, Germany, and Bangladesh.

== Monuments and places of interest ==
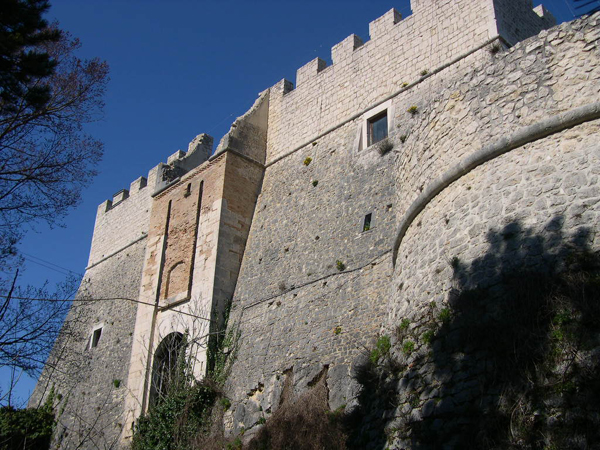
Castello Monforte

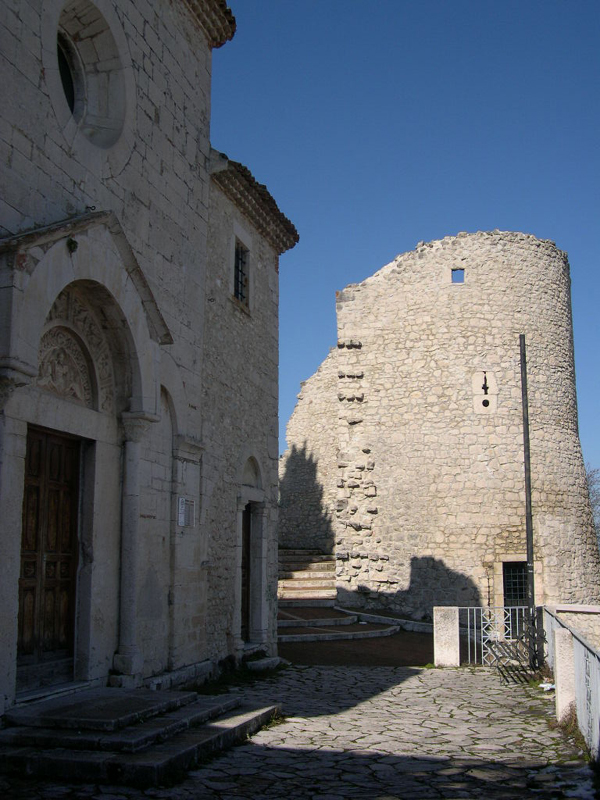
Church of San Bartolomeo

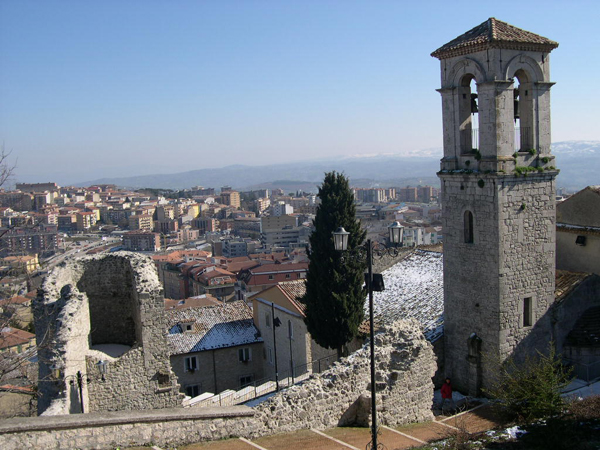
Bell tower of S. Bartolomeo Church in the medieval centre of Campobasso

- Castello Monforte, built in 1450 by the local ruler Nicola II Monforte, over Lombard or Norman ruins. The castle has Guelph merlons and stands on a commanding point, where traces of ancient settlements (including Samnite walls) have been found. The current construction is the result of later rebuilding after the earthquakes of 1456 and 1805.
- Chiesa della Madonna del Monte (Santa Maria Maggiore), erected in the 11th century and rebuilt in 1525. It houses a precious wooden statue of the Incoronata from 1334. Below the castle, the church of St. George is probably the oldest in Campobasso, built around the year 1000 AD over the ruins of a Pagan temple.
- Cathedral, or Chiesa della Santissima Trinità (Church of the Holy Trinity), was built in 1504 outside the city walls. It was destroyed by an earthquake in 1805 and a new Neoclassical edifice was built in 1829.
- Church of San Bartolomeo is a Romanesque building from the 11th century, in limestone. The interior has a nave and two aisles.
- Church of San Leonardo (14th century) has a façade mixing Gothic and Romanesque elements, and a side mullioned window with vegetable decorations influenced by the Apulian architecture of the period.
- Villa de Capoa, recently restored, is a noteworthy garden with statues and a wide variety of plant species, including sequoias, Norway Spruces, cypresses and Lebanon Cedars.

== Transport ==
=== Railways ===
Campobasso railway station, which is managed by Centostazioni, is located in the centre of the city at the junction of two lines: that from Termoli to Vairano and the branch from Benevento.

=== Roads and highways ===
Road traffic is regulated by the State Road Sannitica, by the State Road SS645 Del Tappino and by the State Road 647 Fondo Valle del Biferno.

=== Public transport ===
The urban public transport consists of 23 lines of autobus managed by the SEAC company.

=== Air transport ===
Campobasso doesn't have its own airport. The nearest major airport is Naples International Airport, which is located 154 km (96 mi) south-west of the city.

== Notable people ==
- Fred Bongusto (1935–2019), singer
- Alberto Bonucci (1918–1969), actor
- Dino Bravo (1948–1993), professional wrestler
- Tony Dallara (1936–2026), singer
- Pasquale Gravina (born 1970), volleyball player
- Baldasarre Labanca (1832 – 1913), theologian and historian
- Tito Mattei (1839–1914), classical music composer
- Fabrizio Brienza (born 1969), model and actor
- Chiara Izzi (born 1985), jazz singer, composer and musician
- Herbert Ballerina (born 1980), actor, comedian and radio host

== International relations ==
=== Twin towns – sister cities ===
Campobasso is twinned with:

- Ottawa, Canada
- Huế, Vietnam
- Lezhë, Albania
- Frontera Hidalgo, Mexico
- Mahopac, United States
- Vladimir, Russia
- Banja Luka, Bosnia and Herzegovina
- Sassari, Italy

== See also ==
- University of Molise
- Campobasso Calcio
- Campobasso railway station
