= List of railway stations in Molise =

This is the list of the railway stations in Molise owned by Rete Ferroviaria Italiana, a branch of the Italian state company Ferrovie dello Stato.

== List ==
Station	Locality	Province	Category
Baranello	Baranello	Campobasso	Bronze
Bojano	Bojano	Campobasso	Bronze
Bonefro Santa Croce	Bonefro	Campobasso	Bronze
Campobasso	Campobasso	Campobasso	Silver
Campolieto-Monacilioni	Campolieto	Campobasso	Bronze
Campomarino	Campomarino	Campobasso	Bronze
Carovilli-Roccasicura	Carovilli	Isernia	Bronze
Carpinone	Carpinone	Isernia	Bronze
Casacalenda-Guardialfiera	Casacalenda	Campobasso	Bronze
Isernia	Isernia	Isernia	Silver
Larino	Larino	Campobasso	Bronze
Matrice-Montagano-San Giovanni in Galdo	Matrice	Campobasso	Bronze
Montenero-Petacciato	Montenero di Bisaccia	Campobasso	Bronze
Pescolanciano-Chiauci	Pescolanciano	Isernia	Bronze
Ripabottoni-Sant'Elia	Ripabottoni	Campobasso	Bronze
Roccaravindola	Roccaravindola	Isernia	Bronze
Sant'Agapito-Longano	Sant'Agapito	Isernia	Bronze
San Giuliano del Sannio	San Giuliano del Sannio	Campobasso	Bronze
San Pietro Avellana-Capracotta	San Pietro Avellana	Isernia	Bronze
Sepino	Sepino	Campobasso	Bronze
Sessano del Molise	Sessano del Molise	Isernia	Bronze
Sesto Campano	Sesto Campano	Isernia	Bronze
Termoli	Termoli	Campobasso	Gold
Vastogirardi	Vastogirardi	Isernia	Bronze
Venafro	Venafro	Isernia	Silver
Villa San Michele	Villa San Michele	Isernia	Bronze
Vinchiaturo	Vinchiaturo	Campobasso	Bronze

== See also ==
- Railway stations in Italy
- Ferrovie dello Stato
- Rail transport in Italy
- High-speed rail in Italy
- Transport in Italy
