= Termoli–Campobasso railway =

Italian railway line

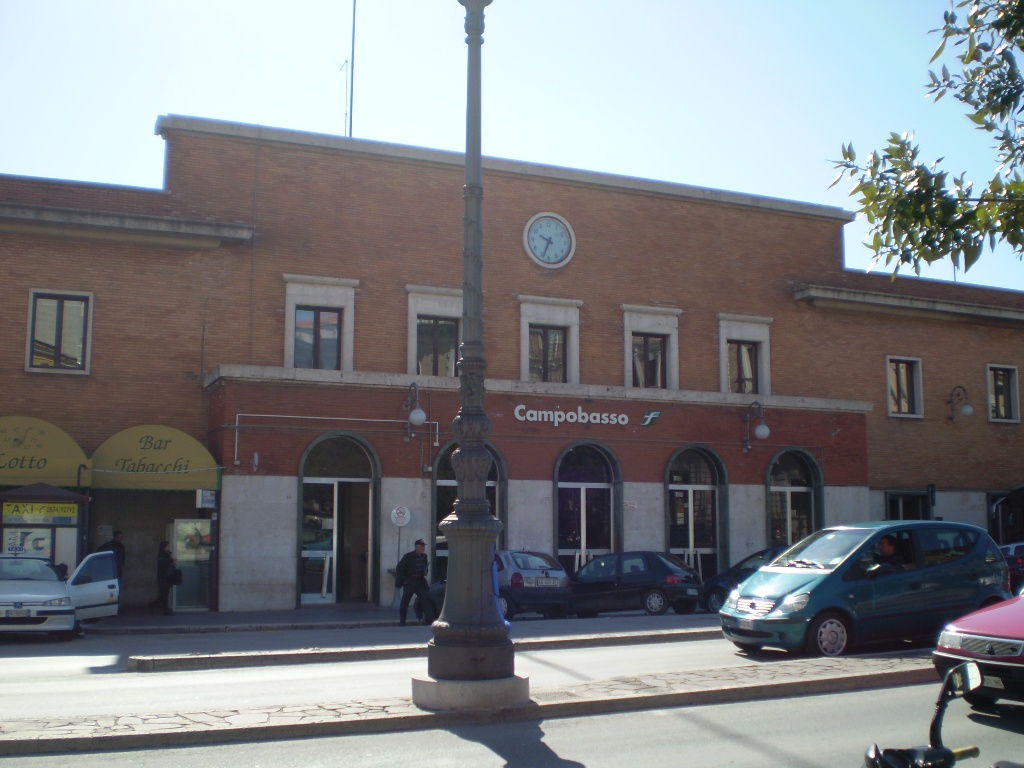
- Campobasso Train station

Overview
- Status: Operational
- Locale: Molise, southeast Italy
- Termini: Termoli railway station; Campobasso railway station
- Stations: 8 (open)

Service
- Type: Railway
- System: Rete Ferroviaria Italiana (RFI)
- Operator(s): Trenitalia

History
- Opened: 1882–1883

Technical
- Line length: 87 km (54 mi)
- Number of tracks: one
- Track gauge: 1,435 mm (4 ft 8 1/2 in) standard gauge
- Electrification: Not Electrified only diesel traction

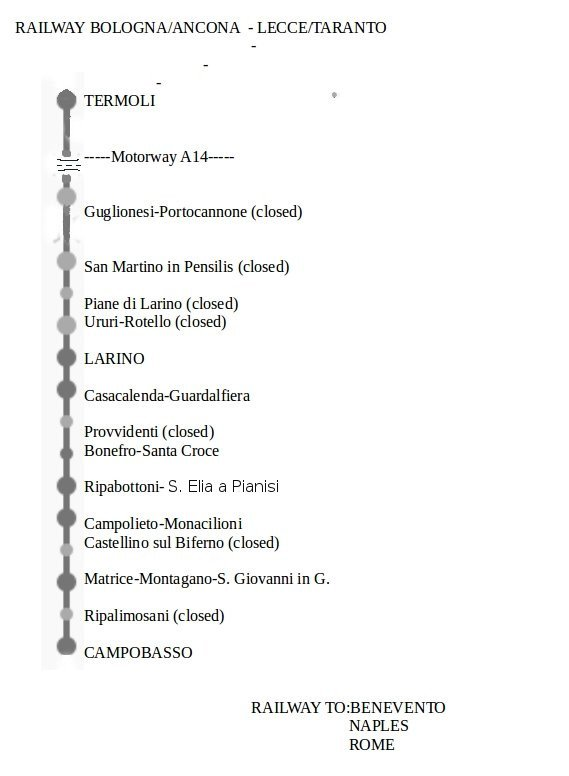
Termoli–Campobasso railway line map

The Termoli–Campobasso railway line is a secondary railway line in Molise, Italy. When it first opened in 1883, the line consisted of 15 stations. Today, only 8 are open to passenger service.

The line runs from regional capital Campobasso along Molise's coast on the Adriatic sea, terminating at the Termoli railway station and connects to the Adriatic railway.

At Campobasso, the line also connects to the Campobasso–Venafro railway, which provides access to neighboring provinces. Together, the two rail lines form the Termoli–Venafro railway.

== History ==
The Line was funded by the late 19th-century Baccarini Law which aimed to connect rural and small towns across Italy via railways.

On 15 December 2001, the Castellino sul Biferno station, Piane di Larino station and Ripalimosani station were demolished after being discontinued for some time.

Between 9 December 2016 and August 2020, tail service was suspended and replaced with buses.

Path–Inauguration

- Termoli–Larino 12 March 1882
- Larino–Casacalenda 21 January 1883
- Casacalenda–Campobasso 21 October 1883

== Stations list ==
Station	Locality	Province	Classification
Termoli	Termoli	Campobasso	Silver
Guglionesi–Portocannone	Guglionesi	Campobasso	Closed
San Martino in Pensilis	San Martino in Pensilis	Campobasso	Closed
Piane di Larino	Larino	Campobasso	Closed
Ururi–Rotello	Ururi	Campobasso	Closed
Larino	Larino	Campobasso	Bronze
Casacalenda–Guardalfiera	Casacalenda	Campobasso	Bronze
Provvidenti	Casacalenda	Campobasso	Closed
Bonefro Santa Croce	Bonefro	Campobasso	Bronze
Ripabottoni–S.Elia	Ripabottoni	Campobasso	Bronze
Campolieto–Monacilioni	Campolieto	Campobasso	Bronze
Castellino del Biferno	Matrice	Campobasso	Closed
Matrice–Montagano–San Giovanni in Galdo	Matrice	Campobasso	Bronze
Ripalimosani	Ripalimosani	Campobasso	Closed
Campobasso	Campobasso	Campobasso	Silver

== Bibliography ==
- Rif.Legge Baccarini(L. 29 luglio 1879, n. 5002), Relazione statistica sulle costruzioni e sull'esercizio delle strade ferrate italiane per l'anno 1882 (1883). MINISTERO DEI LAVORI PUBBLICI. DIREZIONE GENERALE DELLE STRADE FERRATE (in Italian). Rome: Tipografia Eredi Botta, 1883. p. 116.

== See also ==
- Termoli–Venafro railway
- History of rail transport in Italy
- List of railway stations in Molise
- Rail transport in Italy
- Railway stations in Italy
