= 2002 Molise earthquakes =

Earthquakes in Italy

- UTC time
- A: 2002-10-31 10:32:58
- B: 2002-11-01 15:09:00
- ISC event
- A: 3512908
- B: 6121342
- USGS-ANSS
- A: ComCat
- B: ComCat
- Local date
- A: 31 October 2002
- B: 1 November 2002
- Local time
- A: 11:32:58 CET
- B: 16:09:00
- Magnitude
- A: 5.9 M_{w}
- B: 5.8 M_{w}
- Depth
- A: 22 km
- B: 21 km
- Epicenter: 41.69°N 14.91°E; 41.68°N 14.84°E
- Areas affected: Italy: Molise & Apulia
- Max. intensity: MMI VIII (Severe)
- Foreshocks: yes
- Casualties: 29 killed, 135 injured

Two earthquakes hit the Italian regions of Molise and Apulia on 31 October at 10:32:58 (UTC) and 1 November at 15:09:00 (UTC). The shocks had magnitudes of 5.9 and 5.8 M_{w} respectively. Most of the victims were killed and injured when a school collapsed in the town of San Giuliano di Puglia: 26 of the 51 schoolchildren died, together with one of their teachers. In particular, none of the nine children in the school's 4th Year (mostly born in 1996) survived.

== Tectonic setting ==
Molise and Apulia lie above a series of thrust sheets that were emplaced northeastwards on top of the foreland of the Adriatic plate due to continental collision during the Neogene. In the southern part of the Apennines, the thrusting is no longer active, but it continues in northern Italy along the southern margin of the Po Plain. The foreland to the east is characterised by zones of active west–east trending dextral (right-lateral) strike-slip faulting. The best described of these zones is the Mattinata Fault, which has a clear topographic expression on the south side of the Gargano Peninsula and has been traced offshore into the Adriatic Sea. The estimated epicentre of the 1627 Gargano earthquake lies just beyond the western end of the known extent of the Mattinata Fault, although the link between the two remains uncertain.

The Molise and Apulia regions are areas of low historical seismicity and relatively few earthquake records are available from the instrumental era.

== Earthquake sequence ==
The Molise earthquake sequence began with a series of foreshocks during the night of 30–31 October with the strongest at 03:27 local time. This had a magnitude of 3.5 M_{L} and a maximum felt intensity of IV–V on the Mercalli intensity scale.

=== First mainshock ===
The first mainshock, and the largest of the sequence, took place at 11:32 local time. It had a magnitude of 5.9 M_{w}, with a focal depth of 22.3 km. It had a strike-slip focal mechanism, indicating movement on either a right lateral west–east fault or a left lateral north–south fault.

=== Second mainshock ===
The second mainshock occurred at 16:09 local time the following day. It was similar in magnitude to the first mainshock at M_{w} 5.8, with a focal depth of 19.1 km. It also had a strike-slip focal mechanism and its recalculated epicentre is about 8 km west of the first mainshock.

=== Aftershocks ===
Large numbers of aftershocks were recorded following the mainshocks. They were distributed over a 15 km long zone. Almost all of the aftershocks occurred at shallower depths than the mainshocks, although none of them were shallower than about 8–10 km depth, suggesting that the ruptures did not extend to the top of the Apulian Platform.

=== Interpretation ===
Taken together, the foreshocks, mainshocks and aftershocks define an approximately west–east near vertical plane about 15 km in length. Two fault segments of 5–7 km length ruptured in the mainshocks. Passive seismic imaging using the dense network of seismometers deployed after the first mainshock has been used to image the fault zone responsible at the top of the Apulian Platform, which lies in the depth range of 4–6 km in the area of the earthquake sequence. This has identified a small pull-apart basin between two west–east trending strike-slip fault segments, with the sequence rupturing the northern segment. This zone is interpreted to be a western extension of the Mattinata fault system.

The focal depth of the two mainshocks and most of the aftershocks suggest that the ruptures occurred in the basement, beneath the Apulian Platform limestones. Most of the aftershocks were also caused by ruptures beneath the Apulian carbonate platform.

== Damage ==
=== First mainshock ===
The strongest tremor took place in the area of lower Molise, which is situated in the north-east of the Province of Campobasso. It reached from the Frentani Mountains to the Fortore valley. It lasted for 60 seconds and could be felt distinctly in the centre of Molise, in the Capitanata, the Province of Chieti, and could be felt in Marche, Bari, Benevento, Matera, Brindisi, Rome, Naples, Potenza, Salerno, Taranto and Pescara.

San Giuliano di Puglia was near the epicentre (located between Campobasso, Larino and the Apennine Dauno). Due to the quake part of the roof of the school building "Francesco Jovine" collapsed. The school included a kindergarten, a primary school and a middle school. The roof landed on the lower part of the school. There were 57 children, 8 teachers and 2 caretakers trapped under the rubble.

=== Second mainshock ===
The second mainshock produced similar intensities to the first but caused some additional damage that in general increased the observed intensity by about 0.5 on the MCS scale at many locations.

The combined isoseismal map for the two mainshocks shows a distinct west–east elongation, consistent with the interpreted west–east fault rupture. However, the observed intensities were locally highly variable, particularly in San Giuliano di Puglia. The greatest damage was observed in a newer part of the town built on a clay-rich layer, contrasting with the old town built on harder limestone bedrock, which was affected far less.

=== Effects on buildings ===
Non-engineered masonry buildings were often badly affected. This was due to generally poor quality walls, a lack of ties (although they may have been ineffective had they been present, due to the poor quality walls), the recent replacement of light roofs with heavier alternatives, such as concrete slabs, or the building of additional storeys, all of which were compounded by a lack of maintenance.

Churches were mostly badly affected, even in towns where most houses were unaffected. Very few of the buildings had ties and the general quality of the masonry walls was low, not much better than those observed in houses.

Buildings with masonry walls and reinforced concrete floors performed particularly badly in the earthquakes, with many of those in the centre of San Giuliano di Puglia being severely damaged. Buildings built entirely of reinforced concrete represented only a small percentage of the buildings in the area, but these generally suffered little or no damage. A few, mostly those with irregular plans, were badly affected.

The Francesco Jovine school was built in the 1960s using reinforced concrete and more recently an additional floor was added, also using reinforced concrete. The design of the recent addition was never analysed for earthquake safety as the area at the time was classified as category 1, "not subject to seismic hazard".

== Response ==
Immediately after the mainshocks, three "Centro Operativo Mistos" (COMs) were established in the area by the Protezione Civile to assist the local authorities and carry out other tasks such as transportation and road management, telecommunications, evacuations, logistics and the coordination of volunteers. The main COM was set up in Larino, with other subsidiary COMs in San Giuliano di Puglia and Casalnuovo Monterotaro. Additional centres, known as "Centro Operativo Comunales" (COCs), were established in San Martino in Pensilis, Bonefro, Colletorto, Ripabottoni and Provvidenti to temporarily take over the functions of the comunes.

Relief operations were carried out by several organisations, including the Vigili del Fuoco, Italian Air Force, Italian Army, Italian Navy, Italian law enforcement, State Forestry Corps, ANAS and Italian Red Cross. Together with over 1400 volunteers, the maximum number of people involved was 3,715.

The initial phase of the response involved evacuation of the inhabitants of the most severely affected areas so that they could be provided with temporary accommodation and food. Shelter was provided using a mixture of tents and caravans at two sites near San Giuliano and Ripabottoni. Nearly 10,000 people were given assistance, with provision of almost 8,000 beds in over 2,000 caravans and tents.

== Aftermath ==
The earthquake hazard maps for Italy were redrawn following this earthquake sequence. The scheme that existed at the time of the earthquakes of three categories, of which the lowest (uncategorised) was not considered to be at risk, was replaced with a fourfold classification. In the new classification, all areas were considered to be at risk of seismic events. Finally, in 2004 the whole country was assessed in terms of ground accelerations for which there is a 10% risk of exceedance in the next 50 years, which is considered the most effective way to reduce the vulnerability to future earthquakes.

The Francesco Jovine school has been completely rebuilt using seismic base isolation techniques, to protect it against any future shocks.

== See also ==
- List of earthquakes in 2002
- List of earthquakes in Italy
