= Provvidenti railway station =

Former railway station in Italy

Provvidenti
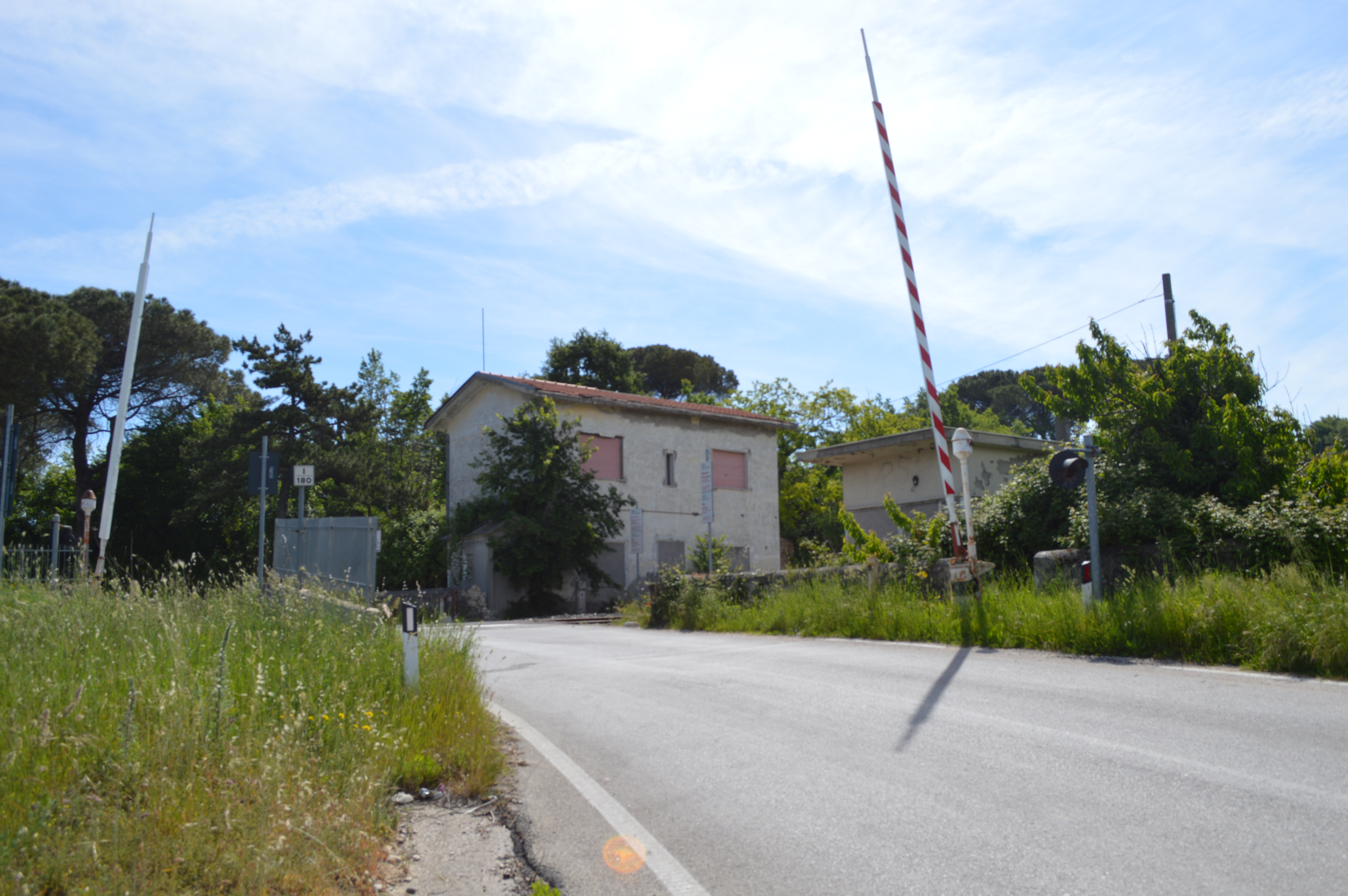
- Level crossing PL 50+ 378 where was the Provvidenti railway station

General information
- Location: Casacalenda, Campobasso, Molise; Italy
- Coordinates: 41°43′43.26″N 14°50′51.93″E
- Operator: Rete Ferroviaria Italiana
- Lines: Termoli–Campobasso; Termoli–Venafro
- Tracks: 1
- Train operators: Trenitalia

Other information
- Classification: closed

History
- Opened: 1949
Location

Open in 1949, the Provvidenti Station was the railway station that served the municipality of Provvidenti (about 4 km away).

Now only a level crossing on the Termoli-Campobasso and Termoli–Venafro, the level crossing is active, but the station (fermata ferroviaria in Italian) is dismantled.

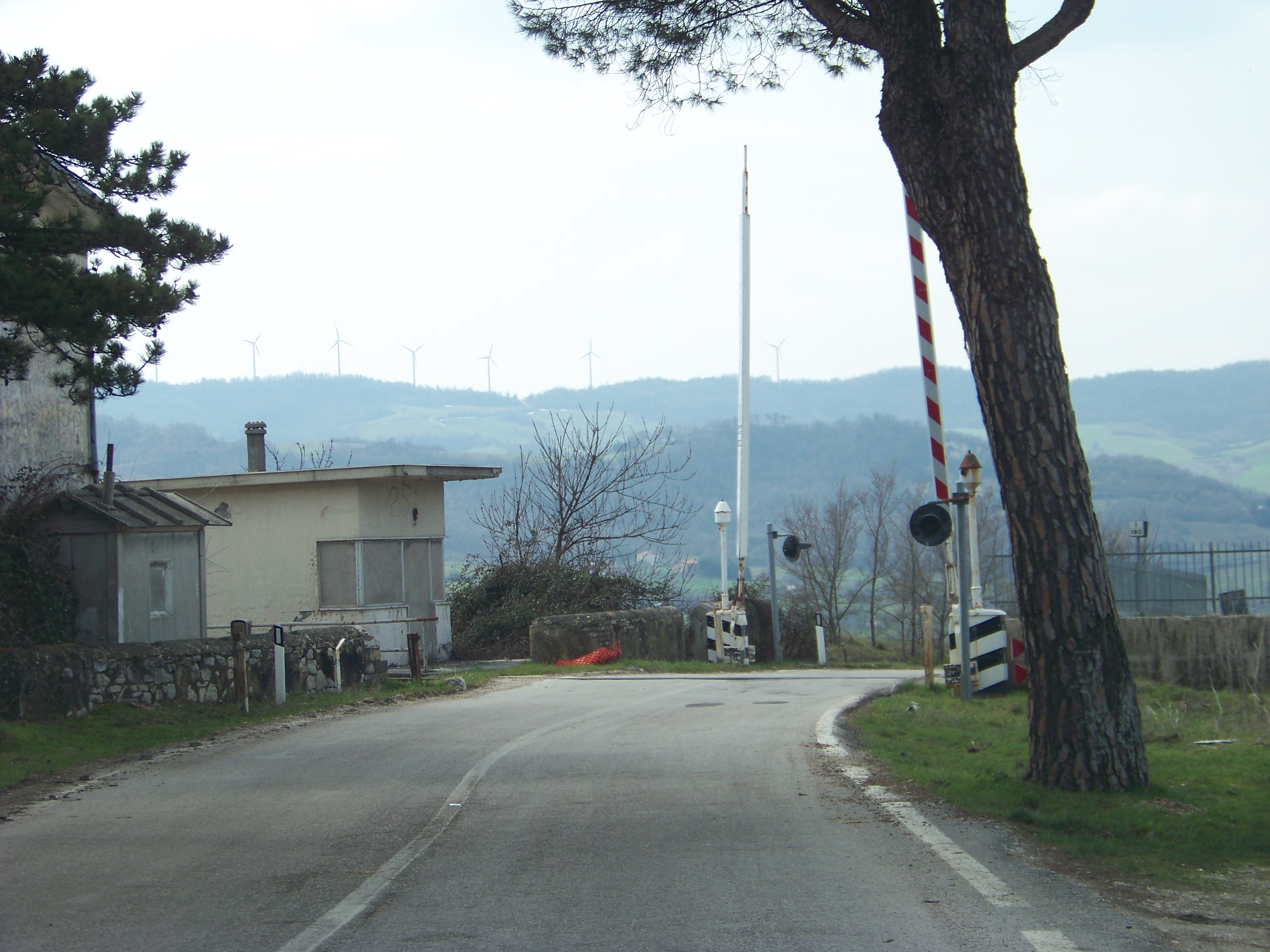
Another view of the level crossing
