= Portocannone =

Portocannone Portkanuni
- Comune
- Comune di Portocannone
- Coat of arms

- Location within Italy Location within Molise
- Coordinates: 41°54′53″N 15°00′29″E
- Country: Italy
- Region: Molise
- Province: Campobasso (CB)

Government
  - Mayor: Francesco Gallo

Area
  - Total: 13.11 km^{2} (5.06 sq mi)
- Elevation: 148 m (486 ft)

Population (30 November 2017)
  - Total: 2,488
  - Density: 189.8/km^{2} (491.5/sq mi)
- Demonym: Portocannonesi
- Time zone: UTC+1 (CET)
  - Summer (DST): UTC+2 (CEST)
- Postal code: 86045
- Dialing code: 0875
- Website: Official website

Portocannone (Arbërisht: Portkanuni) (gate of the law) is an Arbëreshë comune in the Province of Campobasso, in the Italian region Molise, located about 50 kilometres (31 mi) northeast of Campobasso.

Portocannone and Campomarino

== Transportation ==
Portocannone was served by a railway station, the Guglionesi-Portocannone railway station.on the Termoli-Campobasso and Termoli–Venafro line, but the station has been closed for a few years and does not have passenger service.

== People ==
The grand-father of Mateo Musacchio was born in this City.
