= Santa Maria Assunta, Ripabottoni =

Building in Ripabottoni, Italy

Santa Maria Assunta is an ancient Roman Catholic, late-Baroque style, Roman Catholic church in the town of Ripabottoni, Province of Campobasso, Region of Molise, Italy.

The present church was designed by the Neapolitan architect Ferdinando Sanfelice, and built in 1744, at the site of an earlier parish church. The church has frescoes of the Virtues along the arches of the nave, by Paolo Gamba. He also painted a series of medallions with the portraits of saints an prophets. The church contains his altarpieces of Madonna of the Purgatory (1750) and Madonna of the Rosary, and a St Roch (patron of the region). The church also has a St Michael and the fall of Lucifer by Francesco Solimena.
