= Bonefro–Santa Croce railway station =

Railway station in Italy

Bonefro–Santa Croce
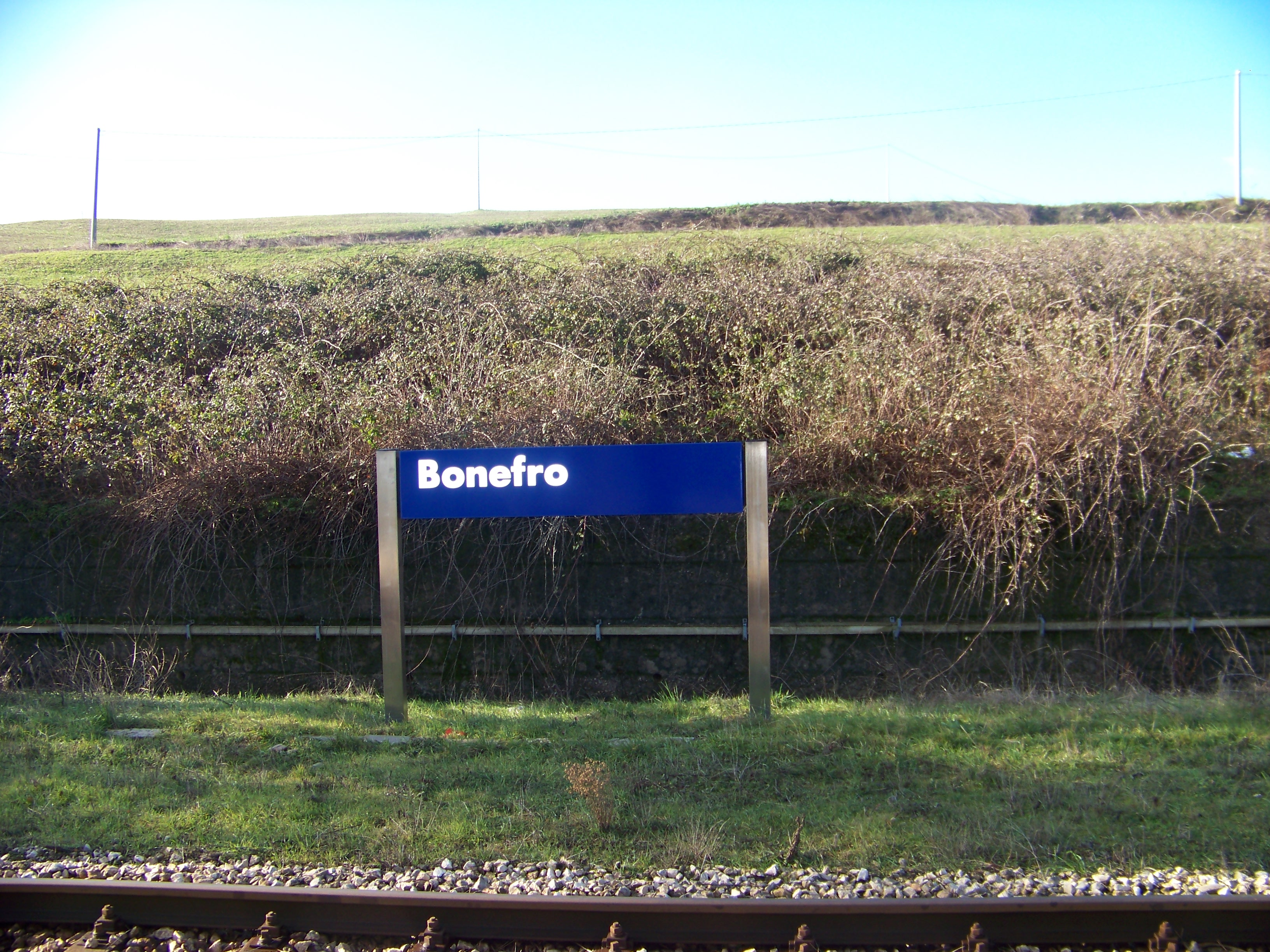
- station sign

General information
- Location: Via San Vito; Bonefro, Campobasso, Molise; Italy
- Coordinates: 41°42′38.52″N 14°51′38.88″E
- Operator: Rete Ferroviaria Italiana
- Lines: Termoli-Campobasso; Termoli–Venafro
- Platforms: 1
- Tracks: 1
- Train operators: Trenitalia

Other information
- Classification: Bronze

History
- Opened: 1883
- Rebuilt: 2004-2005
Location
- Location within Molise Location within Italy

The Bonefro–Santa Croce railway station is the railway stop that serves the municipalities of Bonefro and Santa Croce di Magliano, is in the Bonefro territory.

After the 2002 Molise earthquake the station was demolished and replaced with a covered shelter and remained only one track.

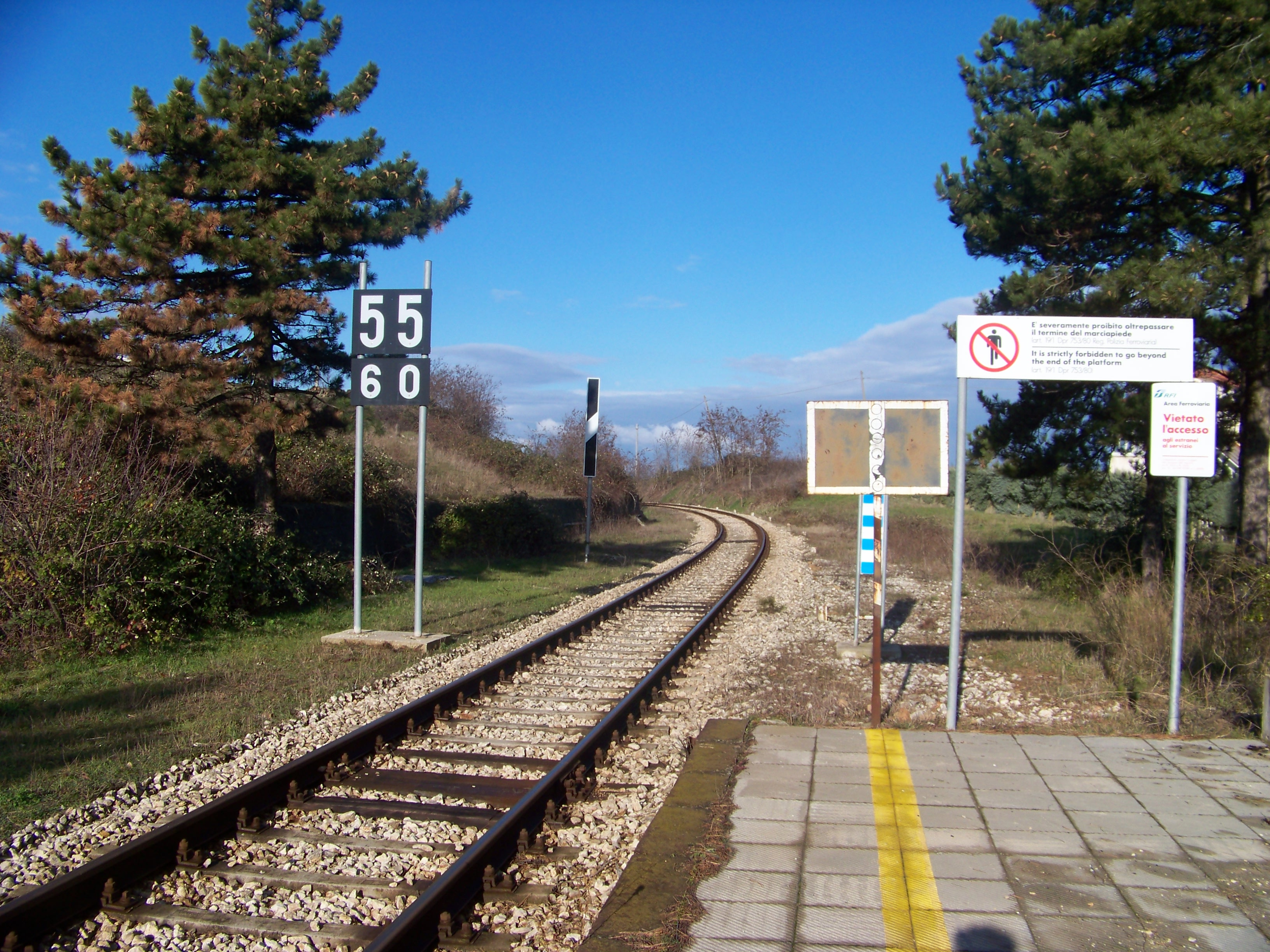
Track direction Termoli
