= Piane di Larino railway station =

Railway station in Italy

Piane di Larino
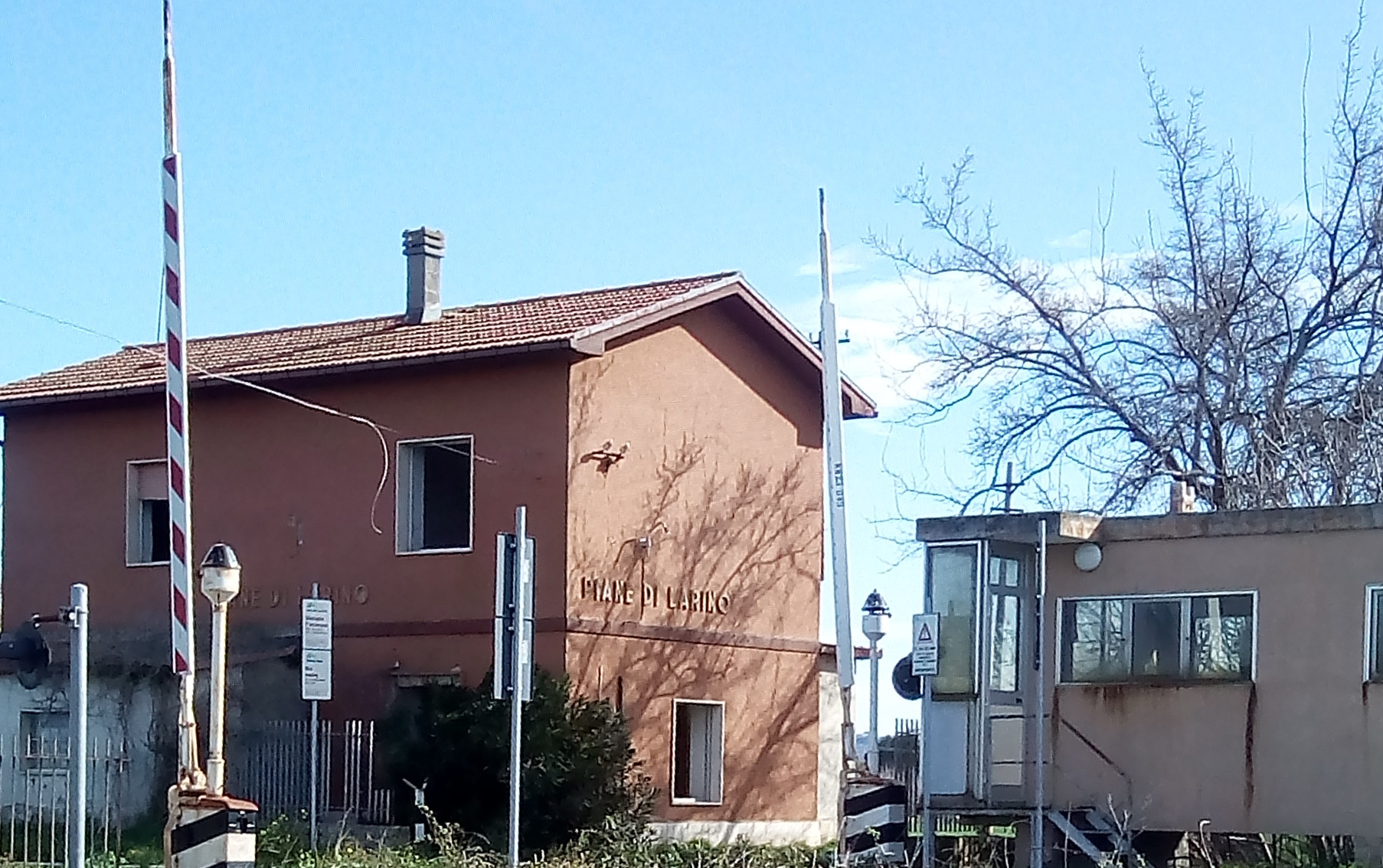
- Piane di Larino station & crossing level

General information
- Location: SS87; Contrada Piane di Larino, Larino, Campobasso, Molise; Italy
- Coordinates: 41°50′32.01″N 14°57′25.19″E
- Operator: Rete Ferroviaria Italiana
- Lines: Termoli–Campobasso; Termoli–Venafro
- Train operators: Trenitalia

Other information
- Status: Closed

History
- Opened: 20 June 1939
- Closed: 15 December 2001
Location

Piane di Larino railway station (Italian: Stazione di Piane di Larino) is a former railway station on the Termoli–Campobasso line.

The station was closed on 15 December 2001 and continues to have an active level crossing.

== Bibliography ==
- La strada ferrata Termoli-Campobasso(Ripalimosani : Arti grafiche La Regione, 1992) Codice identificativo bibliotecario nazionale italiano IT\ICCU\CFI\0251972
- Azienda autonoma delle Ferrovie dello Stato FS Ordine di Servizio n. 76 del 1939
- Rete Ferroviaria Italiana. Fascicolo Linea 138
- Impianti FS, in "I Treni" n. 234 (febbraio 2002), pp. 5–6.
