= Santa Maria Assunta, Montorio nei Frentani =

Building in Montorio nei Frentani, Italy

Santa Maria Assunta is an ancient, Roman Catholic church, rebuilt in late Baroque style in the hill-town of Montorio nei Frentani, in the Province of Campobasso, Region of Molise, Italy.

== History ==
The site once held a church built during the Norman rule, ruined after an earthquake in 1656, and the present church was mainly rebuilt during 1731–38. The baptismal font remains from the ancient church. The detached belltower dates from 1727, and because the church is located at the highest point in town, it is a visible landmark of the town from a distance.

The polychrome marble main altar shelters the relics of the body of San Costanzo. The church has four canvases: "Immaculate Conception", "Our Lady of Sorrows", "Our Lady of Purgatory" and the "Holy Family" by Paolo Gamba. He also painted a dozen medallions, including half-body depictions of the Evangelists and Prophets. Other altarpieces include a work by Antonio Solario, an Annuciation by Teodoro d'Errico, another Flemish artwork depicting the Assumption, and a St. Catherine of Alexandria by an unknown painter. The church was reopened in 2014, after repairs performed due to a recent earthquake.

== See also ==
- Catholic Church in Italy
