= Casacalenda =

- Comune
- Comune di Casacalenda
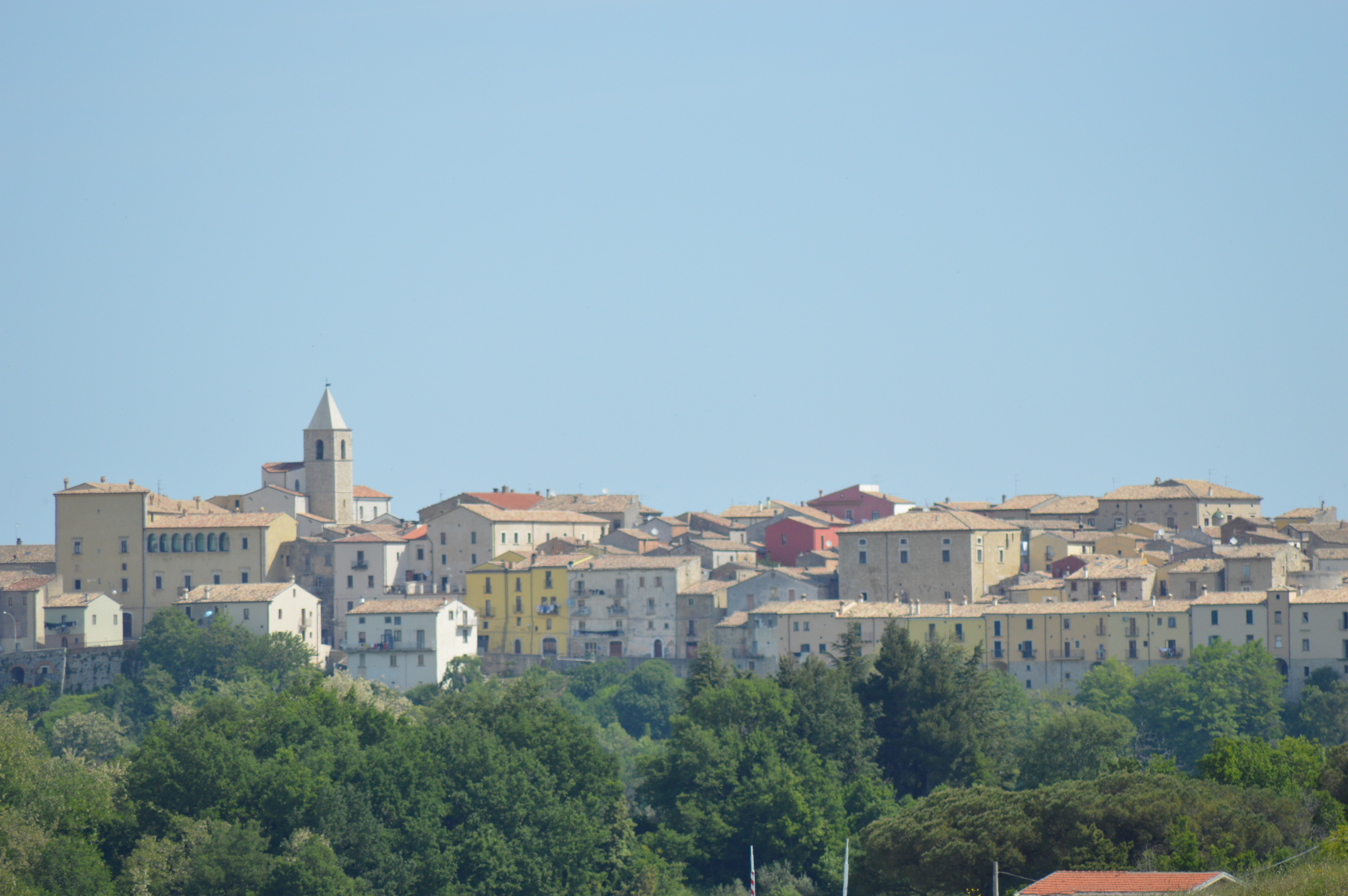
- View of Casacalenda

- Location within Italy Location within Molise
- Coordinates: 41°44′N 14°51′E
- Country: Italy
- Region: Molise
- Province: Campobasso (CB)

Government
  - Mayor: Sabrina Lallitto

Area
  - Total: 67.28 km^{2} (25.98 sq mi)
- Elevation: 670 m (2,200 ft)

Population (30 November 2017)
  - Total: 2,054
  - Density: 30.53/km^{2} (79.07/sq mi)
- Demonym: Casacalendesi
- Time zone: UTC+1 (CET)
  - Summer (DST): UTC+2 (CEST)
- Postal code: 86043
- Dialing code: 0874
- Website: Official website

Casacalenda (Molisan dialect Casechelenne; Kalena) is a comune (municipality) in the Province of Campobasso in the Italian region Molise, located about 25 kilometres (16 mi) northeast of Campobasso.

== History ==
The Greek historian Polybius mentions a battle in 217 BC between the Roman army, based in Kalene, and Hannibal, based in Gerione (now a hamlet of Casacalenda). The name might have been derived from the Latin Kalendae or Kalends, the first day of the month in the Roman calendar.

During the era of Fascist Italy, Casacalenda was the site of a small fascist internment camp administered and operated by the province of Campobasso. The camp was located in an old building once used as a boarding school. The camp was small, never held more than 100 people, and was a women-only camp. At least three categories of internees were recorded at the camp: "enemy subjects", very often British, "foreign Jews", typically German and Polish; and "former Yugoslav" citizens. The camp remained in operation until September 1943, just after the Armistice of Cassibile, at which point the people were freed.

== Emigration ==
Since the end of World War II until the 1970s, the town's population declined considerably due to emigration. The places of choice for these emigrants were the Canadian cities of Hamilton, Montreal and Toronto. Montreal even has its own Casacalenda Association. Duncan, British Columbia also has a sizeable community per its population.

Cleveland, Ohio and East Greenwich, Rhode Island also have a large population of citizens from Casacalenda. Buenos Aires, Argentina is the other destination where Casacalenda population emigrated.

== Churches ==
Among its churches is Santa Maria Maggiore.

== Geography ==
Casacalenda borders the following municipalities: Bonefro, Guardialfiera, Larino, Lupara, Montorio nei Frentani, Morrone del Sannio, Provvidenti, Ripabottoni.

== Transportation ==
Casacalenda is served by a railway station, the Casacalenda-Guardalfiera railway station, on the Termoli-Campobasso and Termoli–Venafro line.
