= Santa Maria Maggiore, Casacalenda =

Catholic church in Campobasso province, Italy

Coordinates: 41°44′21.7″N 14°51′08.8″E

Santa Maria Maggiore is an ancient, Roman Catholic church, rebuilt in late Renaissance style in the hill-town of Casacalenda, in the Province of Campobasso, Region of Molise, Italy.

== History ==
An older church, as is common in the region, was severely damaged by an earthquake in 1456, and a larger church was built in the general site around 1587, while parts of the original church were incorporated into private residences. Further earthquakes have led to further reconstructions across the centuries. From the ancient church are two sculptures in the lunette of the entrance portal. The church houses a Nativity by Fabrizio Santafede, a Death of Saint Joseph by Antonio Solario, a Deposition of Christ (1658) by Benedetto Brunetti, and a Virgin and Child with Saints and Prelates (1752) by Paolo Gamba. The altar of St Joseph has a marble bas-relief representing the Deposition of Christ.
