= Campobasso railway station =

Railway station in Italy

Campobasso
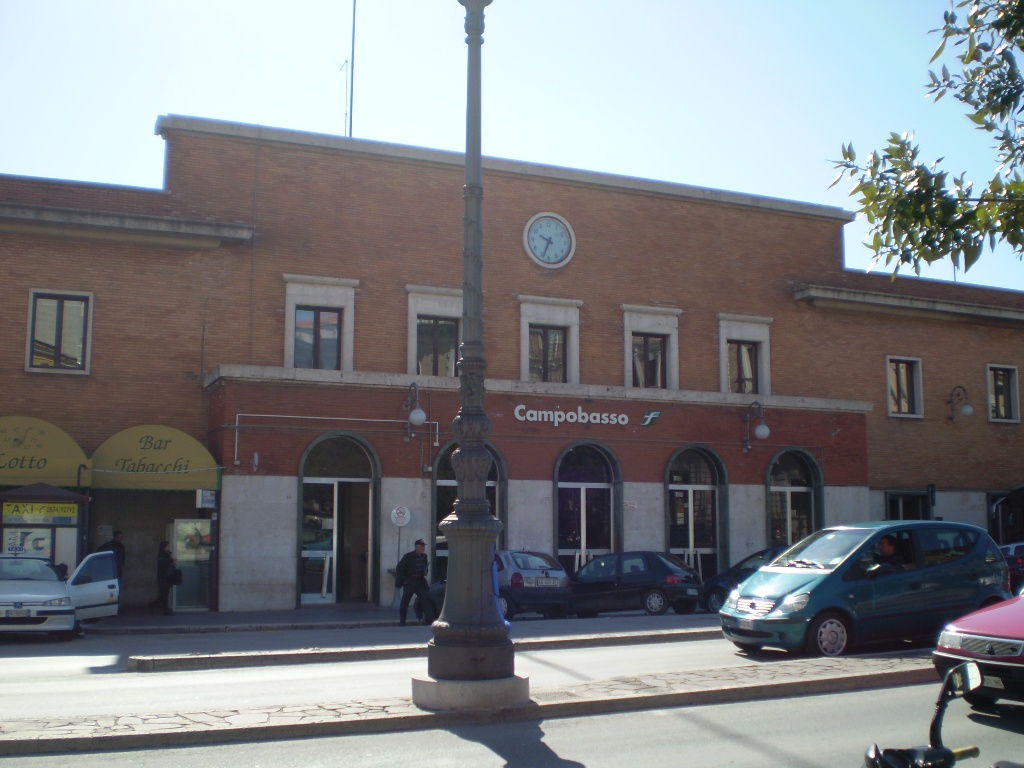
- View of the passenger building

General information
- Location: Piazza Vincenzo Cuoco 13-21; 86100 Campobasso; Campobasso, Campobasso, Molise; Italy
- Coordinates: 41°33′30″N 14°39′50″E
- Operator: Rete Ferroviaria Italiana; Centostazioni
- Line: Termoli–Venafro
- Distance: 84.311 km (52.388 mi) from Benevento; 87.206 km (54.187 mi) from Termoli
- Train operators: Trenitalia
- Connections: Urban and suburban buses

Other information
- Classification: Silver

History
- Opened: 5 August 1883; 143 years ago
Location
- Location within Molise Location within Italy

Campobasso railway station (Italian: Stazione di Campobasso) serves the city and comune of Campobasso, in the region of Molise, southern Italy. Opened in 1883, it is located on the Termoli–Venafro railway.

The station is currently managed by Rete Ferroviaria Italiana (RFI). However, the commercial area of the passenger building is managed by Centostazioni. Train services are operated by Trenitalia. Each of these companies is a subsidiary of Ferrovie dello Stato Italiane (FS), Italy's state-owned rail company.

== Location ==
Campobasso railway station is situated at Piazza Vincenzo Cuoco, close to the city centre.

== History ==
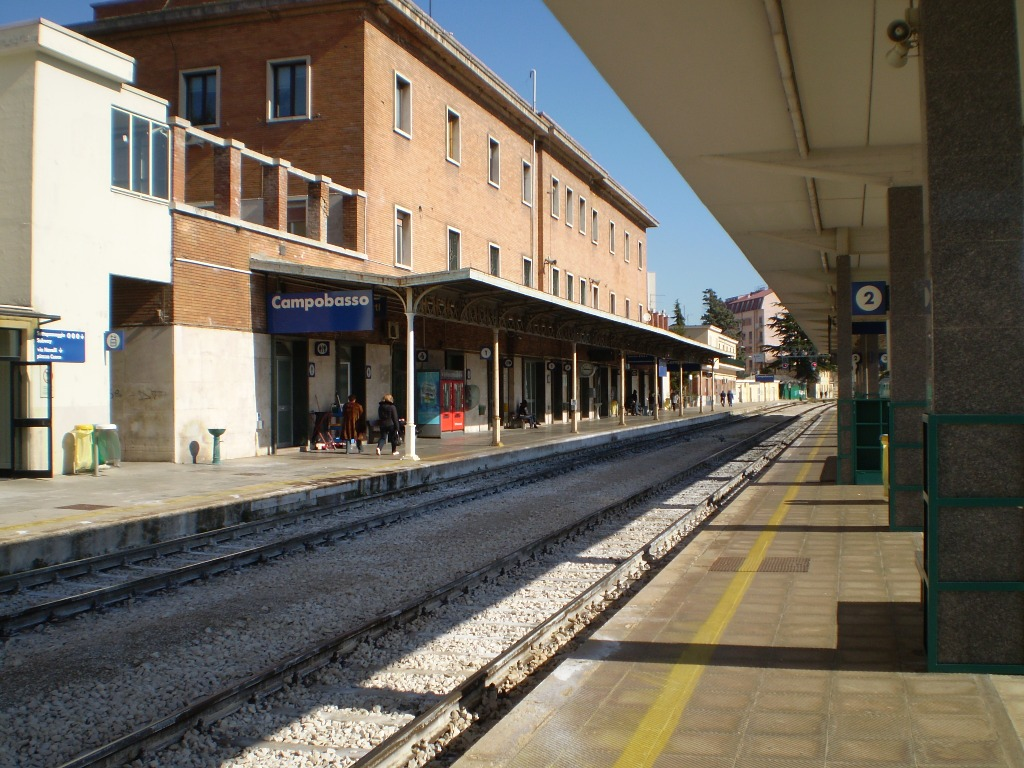
The platform side of the passenger building

The station was opened on 5 August 1883, upon the inauguration of the Baranello–Campobasso section of the Termoli–Venafro railway and the Benevento–Campobasso railway.

== Features ==
The station has a passenger building arranged on multiple levels. It houses the ticket office, waiting room, a kiosk, a restaurant and the headquarters of the Railway Police.

The station is attended, and therefore has a room for the management of train movements.

In the station yard are three through tracks used for passenger services. These tracks are served by two platforms and connected by a pedestrian underpass.

There are other tracks passing through the goods yard, which is equipped with a detached workshop. The station also has a goods shed and locomotive depot.

== Passenger and train movements ==
The station has about one million passenger movements each year. The majority of the passengers use the Termoli–Campobasso; the Benevento–Campobasso railway has relatively little traffic.

All passenger trains passing through the station stop there. The station is also the originating or terminating point of many trains. The main destinations are Termoli, Benevento and Pescara Centrale.

== See also ==
- History of rail transport in Italy
- List of railway stations in Molise
- Rail transport in Italy
- Railway stations in Italy
