= Antonio De Santis =

Italian poet

- Born: Antonio De Santis; October 17, 1931; Larino, Kingdom of Italy
- Died: 4 April 2014 (aged 82); Genoa, Italy
- Occupations: Poet, Painter
- Years active: 1970 - 2013
- Spouse: Franca Novelli
- Children: Corrado De Santis; Giuseppe De Santis; Luca De Santis

Antonio De Santis, Totò (Italian pronunciation: [toˈtɔ]; 17 October 1931 - 4 April 2014) was an Italian poet, famous for his sonnets in Larinese, the dialect of Larino.

== Biography ==
Born in Larino, province of Campobasso, son of Corrado De Santis, owner of cinema of Larino during the years of World War II.
In the early 1950s he moved to Genoa, in Liguria.

== Published works ==
- I Viecch-j ditt (2004), The collection of stories of Larino in the Molise.
- I Viecch-j ditt 2 (2006)
- I Viecch-j ditt 3 (2008)
