= Casacalenda–Guardalfiera railway station =

Railway station in Casacalenda and Guardalfiera, Italy

Casacalenda–Guardalfiera
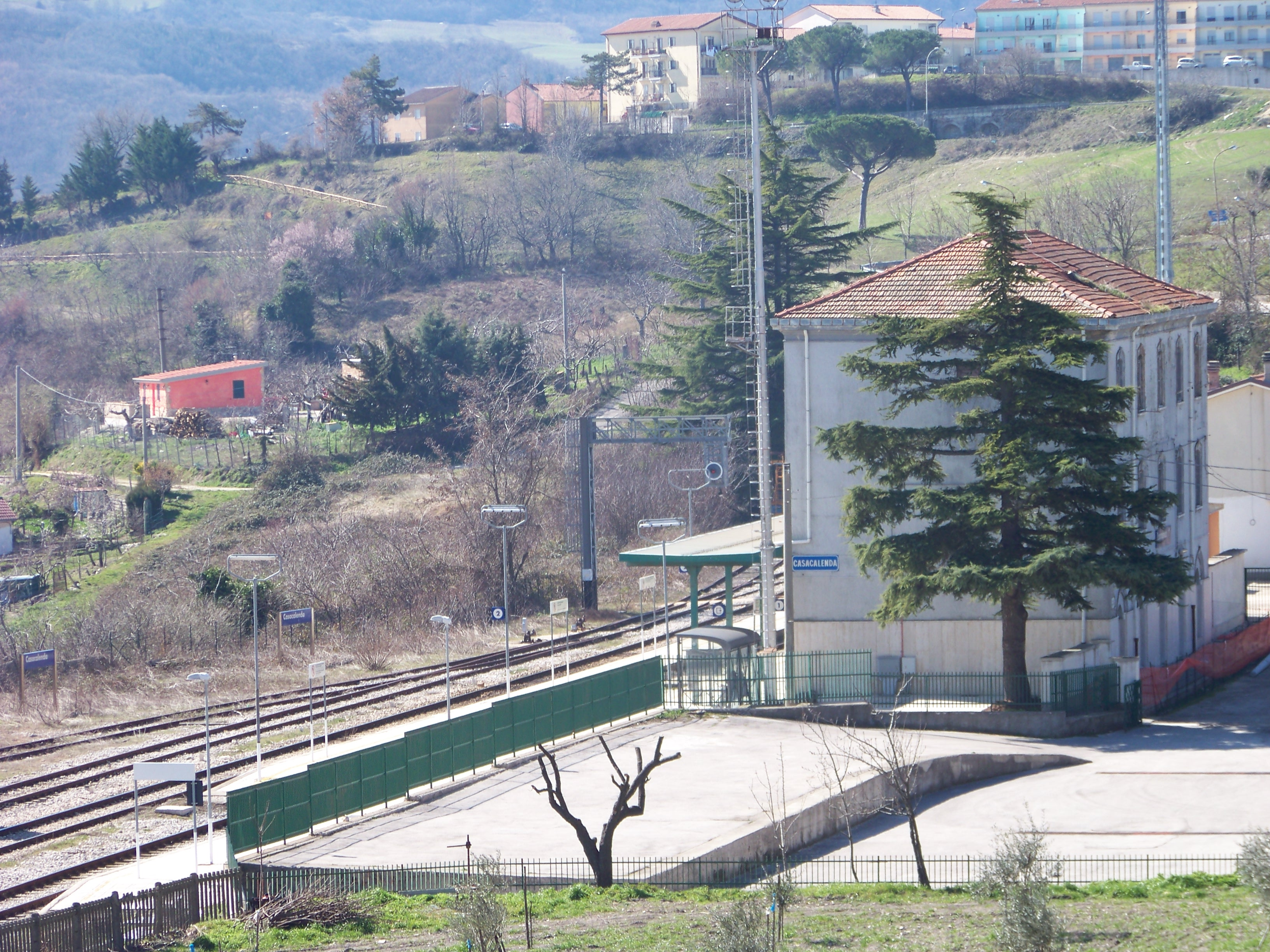

General information
- Location: Casacalenda, Campobasso, Molise; Italy
- Coordinates: 41°44′17.88″N 14°50′58.02″E
- Operator: Rete Ferroviaria Italiana
- Lines: Termoli-Campobasso; Termoli–Venafro
- Platforms: 2
- Tracks: 2
- Train operators: Trenitalia

Other information
- Classification: bronze

History
- Opened: 1883
Location
- Location within Molise Location within Italy

Casacalenda–Guardalfiera railway station (Italian: Stazione di Casacalenda–Guardalfiera) is the railway station serving the municipalities of Casacalenda and Guardalfiera, Italy. It is situated in the centre of Casacalenda.

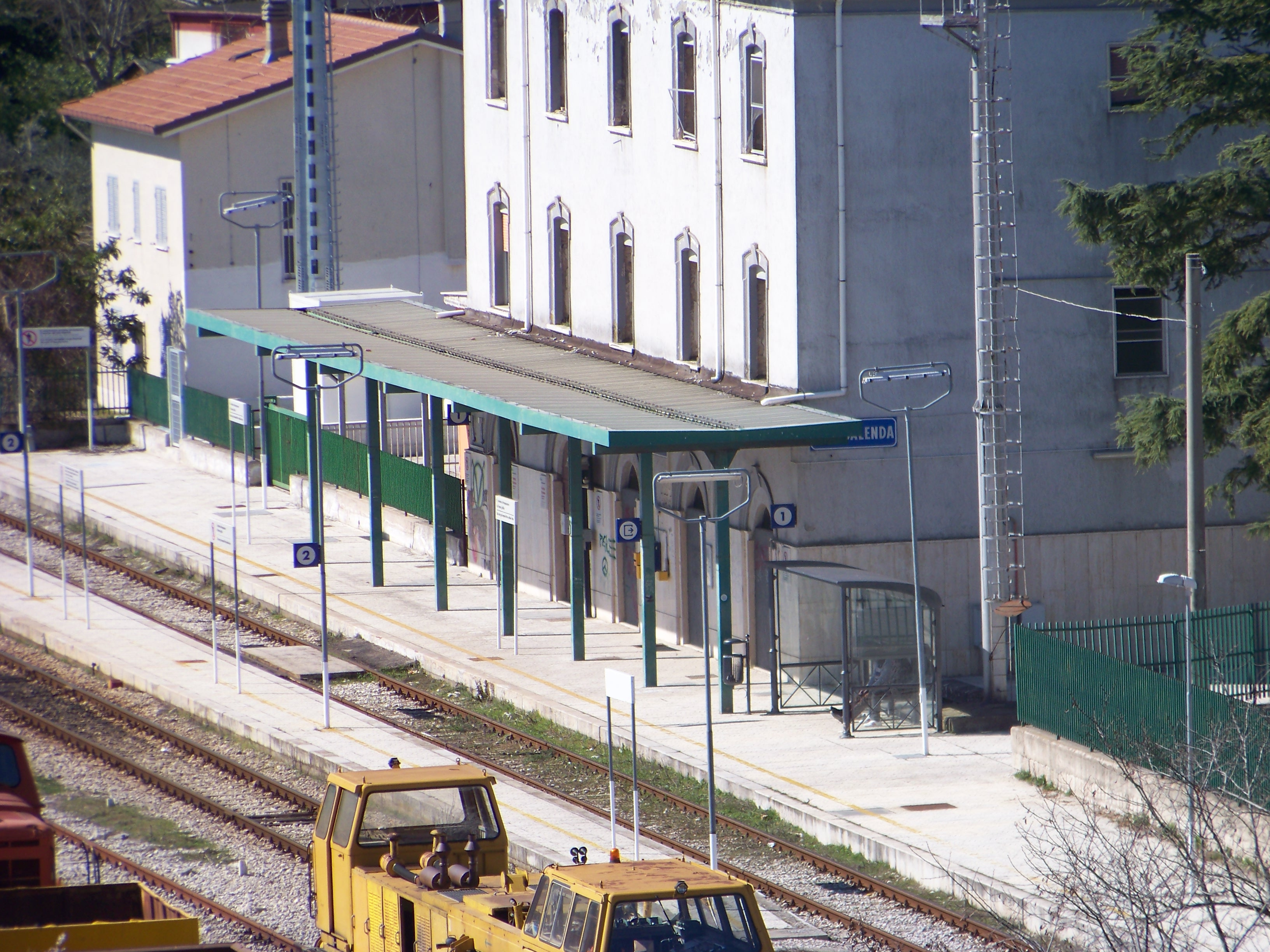
Platform one of Casacalenda–Guardalfiera train station
