= Guglionesi–Portocannone railway station =

Railway station in Italy

Guglionesi–Portocannone

General information
- Location: SS87 - SS647; Guglionesi, Campobasso, Molise; Italy
- Coordinates: 41°55′56″N 14°59′10″E
- Operator: Rete Ferroviaria Italiana
- Lines: Termoli–Campobasso; Termoli–Venafro
- Train operators: Trenitalia

Other information
- Classification: Closed

History
- Opened: 1882
- Closed: 2015
Location

Guglionesi–Portocannone station is the railway station serving the municipalities of Guglionesi and Portocannone and the adjacent industrial area of Termoli. It is located in the municipal area of Guglionesi, of which the town is 10,6 km, while that of Portocannone is 4,1. The Termoli–Campobasso line goes to the station.

The station was closed on February 1, 2015.

The Guglionesi–Portocannone station together with Termoli station are the only electrified stations of the Termoli–Campobasso railway line, the electrified by coal power line interrupts a few hundred meters from the Guglionesi–Portocannone station at the first level crossing in the direction of San Martino in Pensilis railway station.
