= Adamo Abate =

Italian medieval abbot

Saint Adamo Abate
- Pietro Bardellino, La Messa di Sant'Adamo (Saint Adam's Mass), oil on canvas, 1796 (detail). Collegiata di S. Maria Maggiore, Guglionesi.

Abbot
- Born: c. 990; Petazio
- Died: May 3, 1060–1070
- Venerated in: Roman Catholic Church
- Feast: June 3

Saint Adamo Abate (c. 990 – 1060–1070) was an Italian medieval Benedictine abbot, who, around the middle of the 11th century, became abbot of the monastery of Santa Maria delle Isole Tremiti.

== Life ==
He was born in Petazio (today Petacciato) and was baptized in Guglionesi. He became abbot of the Abbey of Santa Maria a Mare on San Nicola in the Tremiti Islands, transforming it into a center of culture and civil and religious renewal.

At the Council of Melfi in 1059, Abbot Adamo authoritatively defended the autonomy of the Tremiti monastery from the Abbey of Montecassino. He was a promoter of the unification of the Southern populations in Italy under Roger II of Sicily. He died on May 3 between the years 1060 and 1070.

== Veneration ==
In June 1102, approximately thirty years after his death, the abbot's relics were stolen from the church of San Paolo in Petacciato and taken to Guglionesi, where the Benedictine was proclaimed patron saint. His relics were housed in the Church of Saint Maria Maggiore in Guglionesi, but were lost when the Turks burned the building down in the 16th century.

The residents of Guglionesi celebrate an annual three-day festival in his honor from June 2 through June 4.
