= Guglionesi =

Guglionesi Ujuniše / Uiniše (Neapolitan)
- Comune
- Comune di Guglionesi
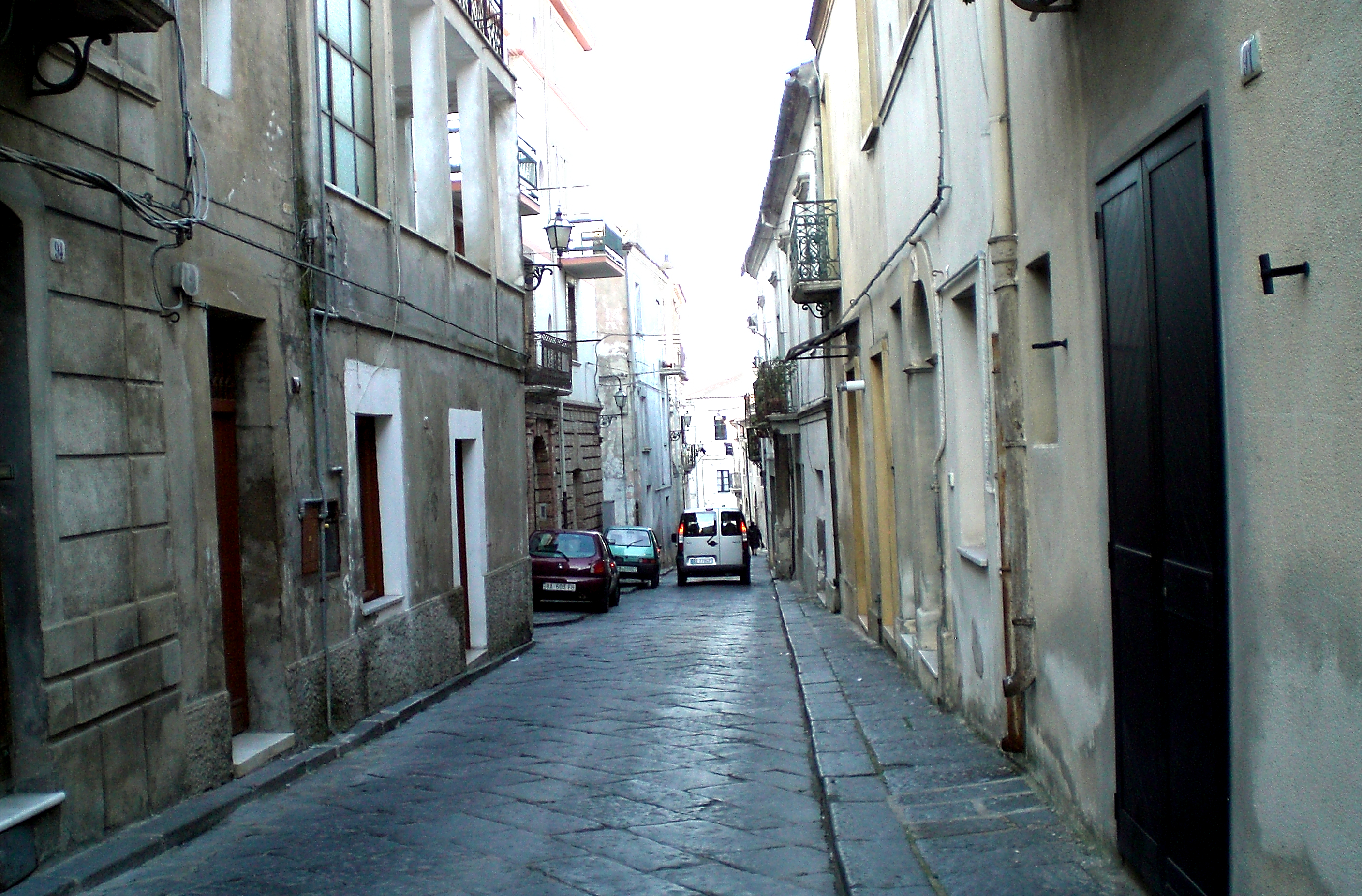
- View of Guglionesi

- Coat of arms

- Location within Italy Location within Molise
- Coordinates: 41°55′N 14°55′E
- Country: Italy
- Region: Molise
- Province: Campobasso (CB)

Government
  - Mayor: Mario Bellotti

Area
  - Total: 100.95 km^{2} (38.98 sq mi)
- Elevation: 369 m (1,211 ft)

Population (30 November 2017)
  - Total: 5,244
  - Density: 51.95/km^{2} (134.5/sq mi)
- Demonym: Guglionesi
- Time zone: UTC+1 (CET)
  - Summer (DST): UTC+2 (CEST)
- Postal code: 86034
- Dialing code: 0875
- Patron saint: St. Adamus the Abbot
- Saint day: 3 June
- Website: Official website

Guglionesi (Italian: [ɡuʎʎoˈneːzi, -eːsi]; local dialect: Ujuniše [ujəˈniːʒə] or Uiniše [wi.əˈniːʒə]) is a town and comune in Molise, southern Italy, about 50 kilometres (31 mi) from Campobasso.

== History ==
Founded in the 5th century BC, at the time it was known as Uscosium or Usconium and together with Pescara, Ortona, Lanciano, Vasto and Larino, it was one of the most important centers of the Frentani, an Italic people that was part of the Samnites confederations.

Thanks to its strategic position along the Via Frentana-Traiana, Usconium became, towards the end of the Republican Era, a municipium, reaching a population of some 25,000 inhabitants.

Usconium was located between Monte Antico and Monte Capraro, where Guglionesi is now found. Its inhabitants depended on the nearby Pagus Collis Nisii or Collenisyus ("Hill of Bacchus"), a hill fort in which they sheltered after the town's destruction by the Goths.

In 412 AD, Colleniso became New Usconium and was encircled by protective walls in the Longobardo period. After that, the most important fortification was raised in the 9th century, when Robert Guiscard took hold of the city. In that period eighteen watchtowers and two castles were erected. The first castle (named "of head" because it was in a higher position than the others, subsequently called "of foot") was located along Via Capitano Verri, where its ruins can still be seen today. The second castle is in Castellara. After the destruction of the second castle, the Convent of the Cappuccini was constructed upon what was left of the castle foundations.

In t801 AD, Colleniso was submitted to the Duke of Spoleto, and endured various incursions by Saracen raiders. In the 1137 AD. it endured pillage from Lotarius, emperor of the Roman Empire. In 1315 King Robert of Anjou gave Collenisio to his brother Peter, Count of Gravina, and at his death, his daughter Agnese inherited the city. In 1340 she founded the Certosa of Saint Giovanni Battista, also known as Porta del Paradiso (The Heaven’s door) where the Hermitage of Saint John is now found. During this time the city was repeatedly invaded; its name was also changed from Colleniso to Guillonisi.

In 1496, after the death of René of Anjou, his cousin Charles VIII of France descended to Italy with a large army and conquered Naples. The French entered Guillonisi (only by the betrayal of the guards of the Frentan door) and plundered the entire village, demolished the two castles and the towers and killed or raped most of the people. Another invasion occurred in the 16th century by the Turks, who set fire, among other things, to the church of Saint Maria Maggiore, and consequently the relics of St. Adam housed in the church were destroyed and lost.

== Transportation ==
Guglionesi was served by a railway station, the Guglionesi-Portocannone railway station on the Termoli-Campobasso and Termoli–Venafro line, but the station has been closed for a few years and does not have passenger service. Nowadays there are a lot of pulman to Termoli, to the industrial zone, to Castelmauro or Campobasso.

== Sister cities ==
- Herceg Novi, Montenegro
