= San Francesco, Larino =

Church building in Larino, Italy

Coordinates: 41.800817°N 14.910778°E

San Francesco is an ancient, Roman Catholic church and convent, rebuilt in Baroque style in the hill-town of Larino, in the Province of Campobasso, Region of Molise, Italy.

== History ==
San Francesco was originally constructed in the 14th-century, contemporary with cathedral, and refurbished in the 18th-century. The facade has Romanesque carved spolia from the 9th century. The vault of the church presbytery has a large fresco depicting Glory of St Francis by Paolo Gamba. Gamba also painted the Assumption (1747) and the Evangelists in the cupola roof. One of the evangelists is supposed to be a portrait of the artist. Gamba also likely painted the St Vincent Ferrer and St Lucia with Angels in Glory.

The 18th-century reconstructions removed the wooden roof, and left highly decorative interior decorations of marble, stucco, and ironwork. The baroque choir has an organ painted with the Franciscan order symbols (two arms crossed with the cross in the middle).

Much of the side altars have painted statuary from the 18th and 19th centuries, including a St Roch by Paolo Saverio Di Zinno. A deteriorated canvas depicting the Expulsion of the Merchants from the Temple is attributed to Francesco Solimena. A San Pardo is attributed to Luca Giordano.

The convent was suppressed in 1809.
