= Campomarino =

Campomarino Këmarini
- Comune
- Comune di Campomarino
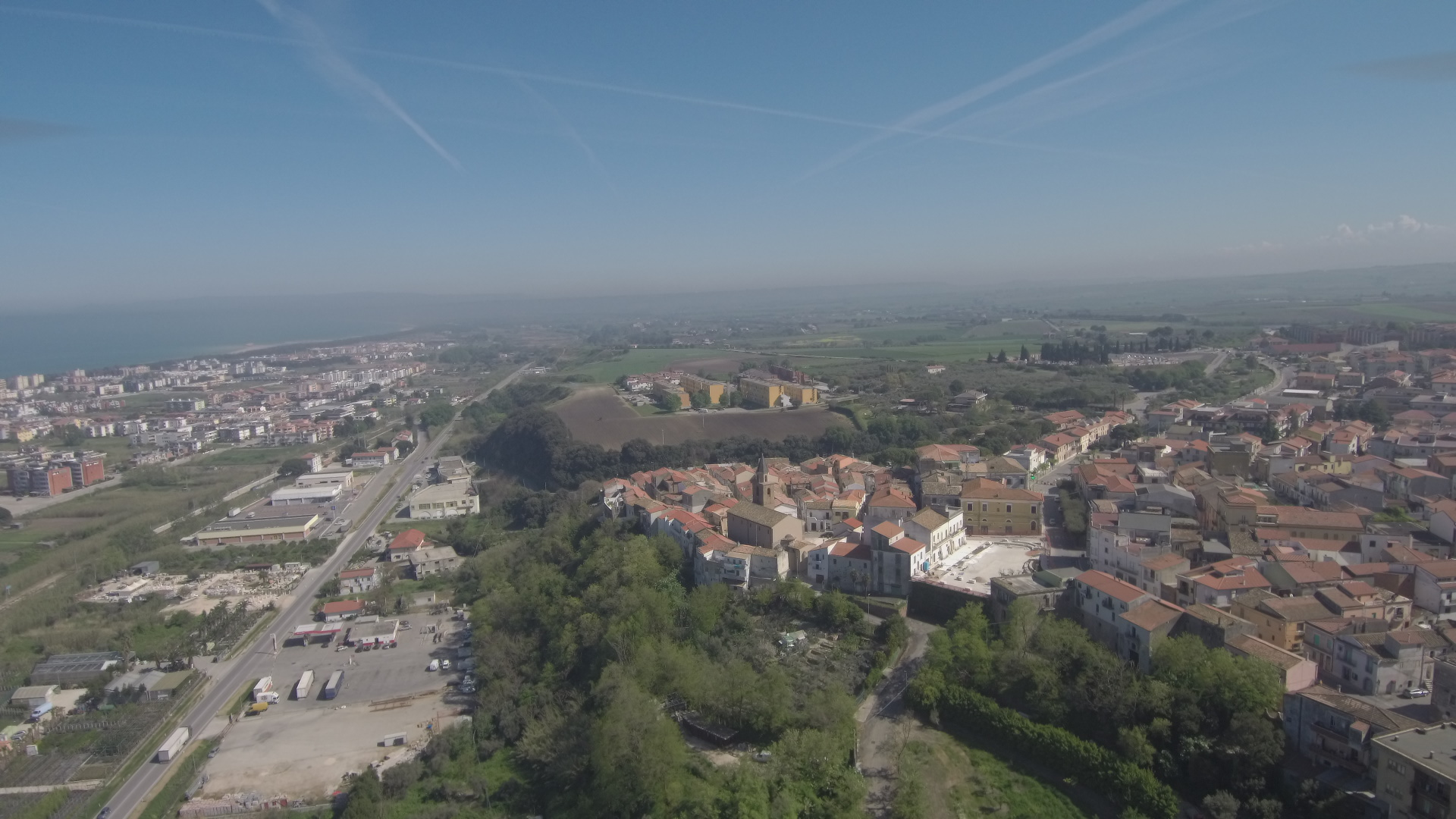
- View of Campomarino

- Coat of arms

- Location within Italy Location within Molise
- Coordinates: 41°57′N 15°2′E
- Country: Italy
- Region: Molise
- Province: Campobasso (CB)
- Frazioni: Nuova Cliternia, Ramitelli, Campomarino Lido

Government
  - Mayor: Francesco Cammilleri

Area
  - Total: 76.68 km^{2} (29.61 sq mi)
- Elevation: 52 m (171 ft)

Population (30 November 2017)
  - Total: 8,075
  - Density: 105.3/km^{2} (272.7/sq mi)
- Demonym: Campomarinesi
- Time zone: UTC+1 (CET)
  - Summer (DST): UTC+2 (CEST)
- Postal code: 86042
- Dialing code: 0875
- Patron saint: St. Christine
- Saint day: July 24
- Website: Official website

Campomarino (Arbërisht: Këmarini) is an Arbëreshë comune in the Province of Campobasso, in the Italian region of Molise, located about 50 kilometres (31 mi) northeast of Campobasso, and about 5 kilometres (3 mi) southeast of Termoli.

The commune includes the seaside tourist resort of Campomarino Lido, just above the sea level, and the village of Campomarino, located on a hill behind it. Campomarino borders the following municipalities: Chieuti, Guglionesi, Portocannone, San Martino in Pensilis, Termoli.
