= Ripabottoni–Sant'Elia railway station =

Train station in Italy

Ripabottoni–Sant'Elia
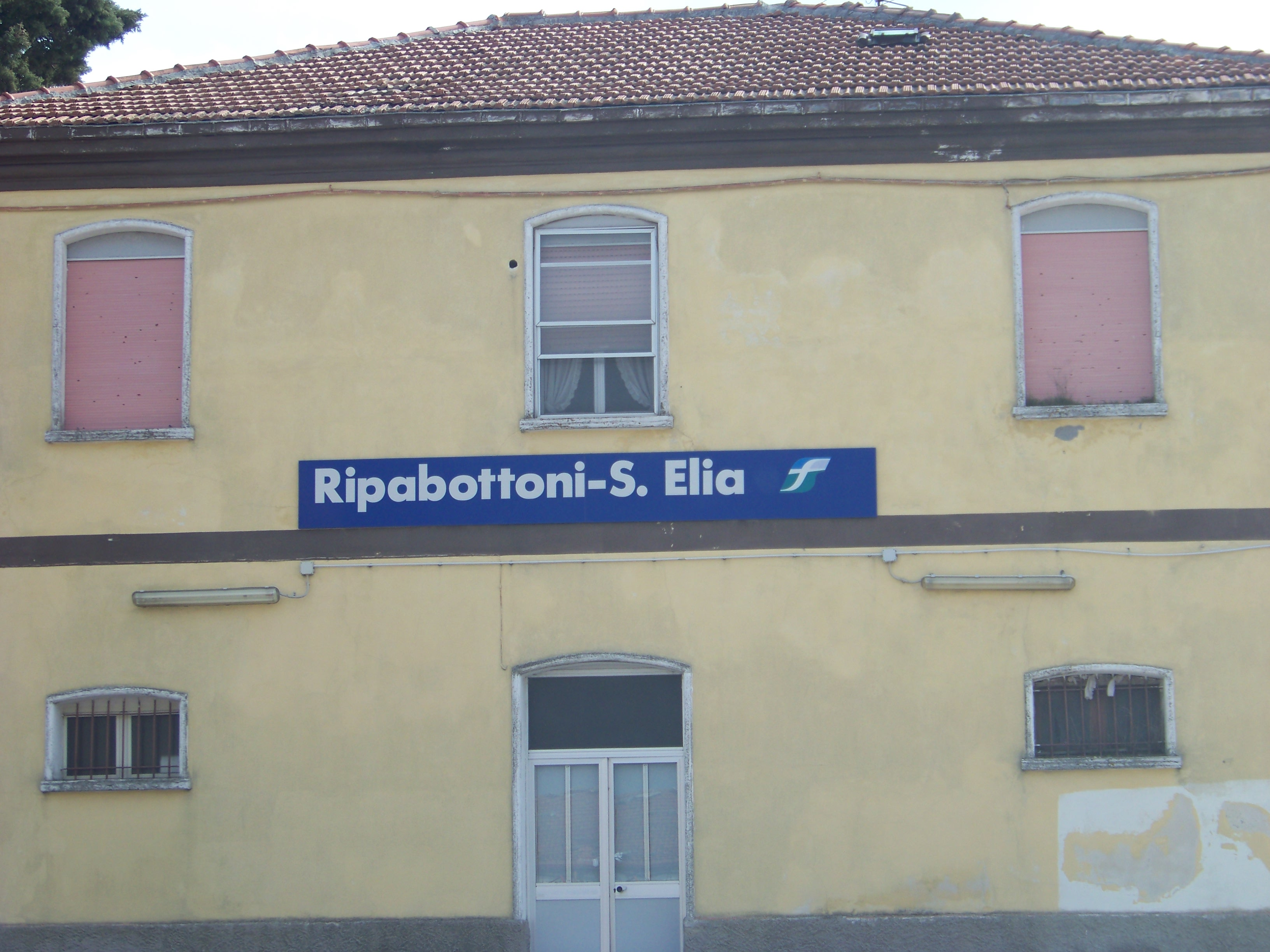

General information
- Location: Contrada Cerro; Ripabottoni, Campobasso, Molise; Italy
- Coordinates: 41°41′11.28″N 14°50′39.12″E
- Operator: Rete Ferroviaria Italiana
- Lines: Termoli–Campobasso; Termoli–Venafro railway
- Platforms: 2
- Tracks: 2
- Train operators: Trenitalia

Other information
- Classification: Bronze

History
- Opened: 1883
Location
- Location within Molise Location within Italy

Ripabottoni–Sant'Elia (sometimes written Ripabottoni–S.Elia) is a railway station in the Italian region of Molise, located in the municipality of Ripabottoni in the Province of Campobasso. It also serves the nearby town of Sant'Elia a Pianisi.

The station lies on both the Termoli–Campobasso railway and the Termoli–Venafro railway, and is operated by Rete Ferroviaria Italiana (RFI). Train services are provided by Trenitalia.

The station was opened in 1883, as part of the development of southern Italy’s rail infrastructure under the Baccarini Law of 1879.

== Bibliography ==
- Ministero dei Lavori Pubblici (1883). Relazione statistica sulle costruzioni e sull'esercizio delle strade ferrate italiane per l'anno 1882 (in Italian). Rome: Tipografia Eredi Botta. p. 116.

This article is based on a translation of the Italian Wikipedia article as of May 2017.

Ripabottoni–Sant'Elia railway station
