= Campolieto–Monacilioni railway station =

Railway station in Italy

Campolieto–Monacilioni
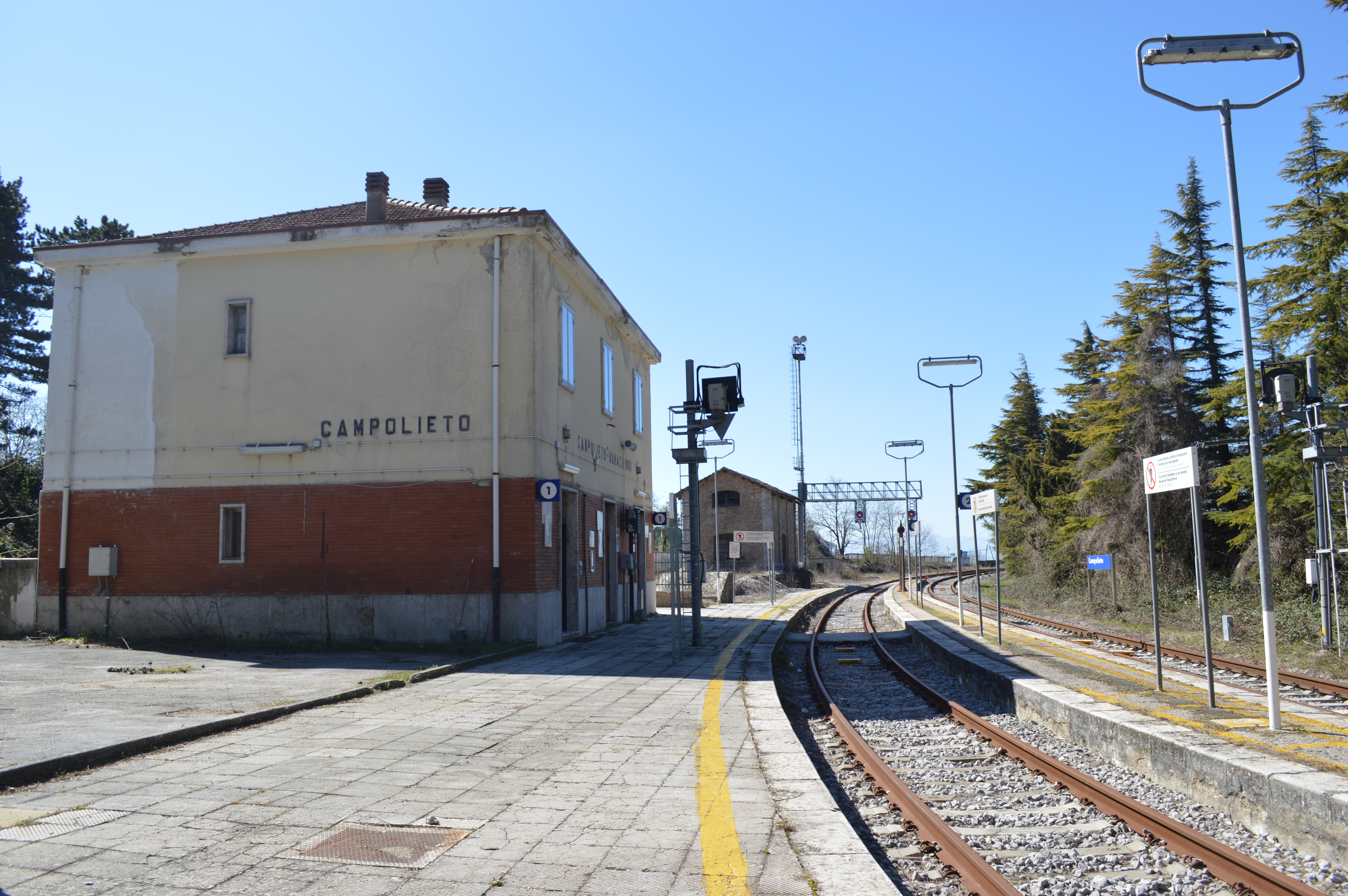

General information
- Location: Campolieto, Campobasso, Molise; Italy
- Coordinates: 41°38′33″N 14°45′56.52″E
- Operator: Rete Ferroviaria Italiana
- Lines: Termoli-Campobasso; Termoli–Venafro
- Platforms: 2
- Tracks: 2
- Train operators: Trenitalia

Construction
- Platform levels: Height above sea level mt. 842.73 as per the engraving on a marble plaque placed on the front wall of the station

Other information
- Classification: Bronze

History
- Opened: 1883
Location
- Location within Molise Location within Italy

The Campolieto–Monacilioni railway station is the train station that serves the municipalities of Campolieto and Monacilioni, is situated in the Campolieto territory.

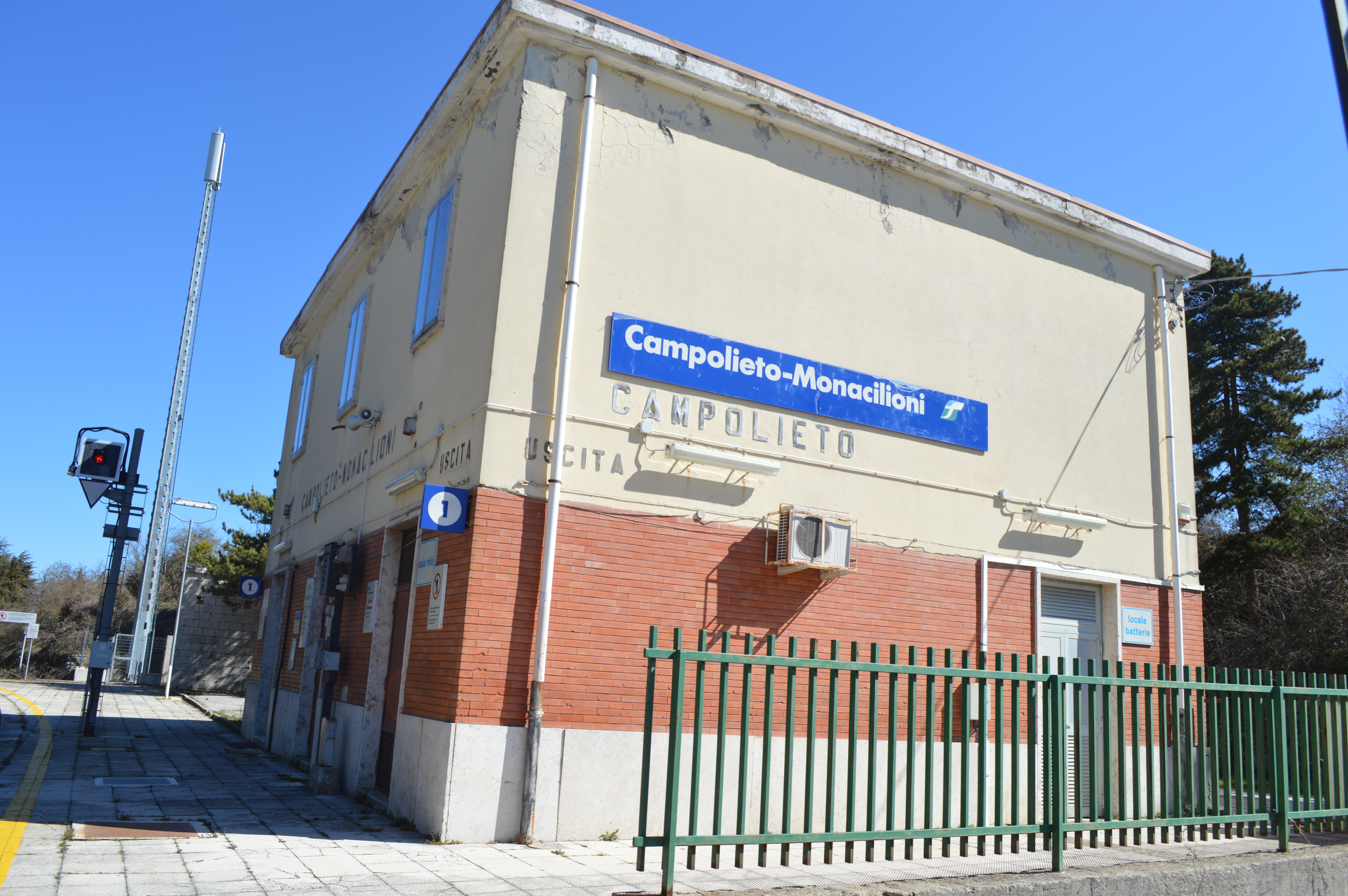
FS train station Campolieto Monacilioni
