= Termoli railway station =

Railway station in Italy

Termoli
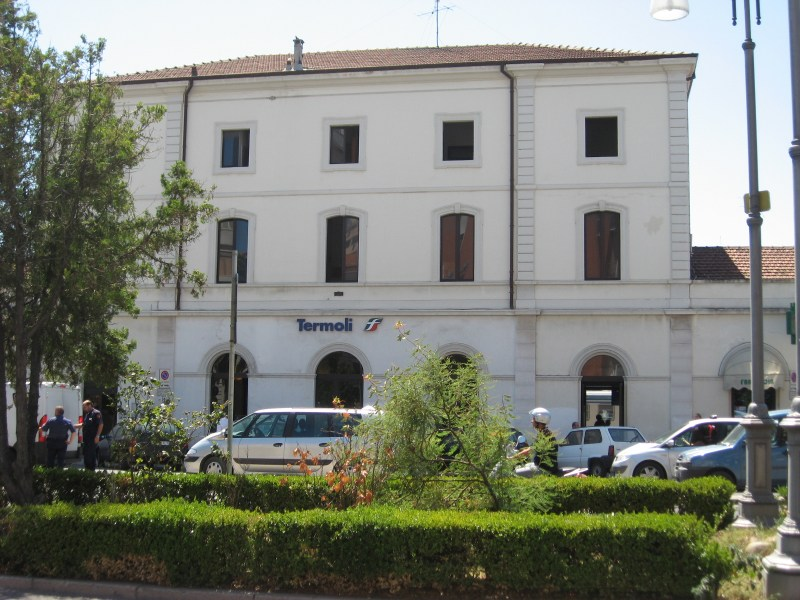
- The original passenger building

General information
- Location: Piazza Giuseppe Garibaldi; 86039 Termoli CB; Termoli, Campobasso, Molise; Italy
- Coordinates: 42°00′02″N 14°59′35″E
- Operator: Rete Ferroviaria Italiana; Centostazioni
- Lines: Ancona–Lecce; Termoli–Venafro
- Distance: 439.437 km (273.053 mi) from Bologna Centrale
- Train operators: Trenitalia
- Connections: Urban and suburban buses

Other information
- Classification: Silver

History
- Opened: 25 April 1864; 162 years ago
Location
- Location within Molise Location within Italy

Termoli railway station (Italian: Stazione di Termoli) serves the town and comune of Termoli, in the region of Molise, southern Italy. Opened in 1864, it forms part of the Adriatic Railway (Ancona–Lecce) and is also a terminus for the line to Venafro, linking the comuni of Molise with both the Adriatic and Tyrrhenian seas.

The station is currently managed by Rete Ferroviaria Italiana (RFI). However, the commercial area of the passenger building is managed by Centostazioni. Train services are operated by Trenitalia. Each of these companies is a subsidiary of Ferrovie dello Stato Italiane (FS), Italy's state-owned rail company.

== Location ==
Termoli railway station is situated at Piazza Giuseppe Garibaldi, close to the city centre.

== History ==
The station was opened to the public on 25 April 1864, simultaneously with the Ortona–Foggia section of the Adriatic Railway. Earlier, on 9 November 1863, King Victor Emmanuel II had officially opened the section between Pescara and Foggia, by setting forth aboard a special train, on track that had been hurriedly completed especially for the event.

On 12 March 1882, the station became a junction station, upon the opening of the first section of the Termoli–Venafro railway, between Termoli and Larino.

== Features ==
The station has two passenger buildings. One of them is the original structure, and the other was built in the 1980s.

The configuration of the original passenger building is fairly typical for Italian railway stations. The original building is constructed of brick, and is made up of three sections. Its middle section has three levels, while the other two sections, extending laterally from each side of the middle section, are both single storey structures.

To the south (or Foggia/Campobasso) side of this main building are other, smaller, buildings used for storage.

Attached to the north (or Pescara) side of the original building is the second building, which evidently has much more modern architectural lines than the first, and represents a sharp contrast with the surrounding buildings. It was built of reinforced concrete, and it has tinted glass windows.

Passenger facilities at the station are: ticket office, cafeteria, waiting rooms, elevators, toilets, bar, newsagent, pharmacy and the office of the Railway Police.

The station yard has five tracks with platforms for passenger traffic. Each platform is accessible from the others by an underpass, which also functions as a pedestrian link between two parts of the city: Viale Trieste and Piazza Garibaldi (or station square).

== Renovations ==
In October 2010, work was completed on the modernization of the facade of the passenger building overlooking Piazza Garibaldi and its waiting rooms and interior passages.

Due to the poor condition of the areas used for the accommodation of people waiting for trains, intervention was required at the front of the building housing the ticket office and offices, along with modernization work and a new coat of paint.

Additionally, the platform facing the Adriatic Railway was raised to a height of 50 centimetres (20 in), thus allowing easier access to trains by reducing the gap in height between the platform surface and that of the carriage floors.

There was also some restoration work done to some of the platform shelters.

The work took about five months to complete.

== Train services ==
The station has about 780,000 passenger movements each year. It has a catchment area that encompasses almost all of Molise.

All InterCity and Eurostar trains passing through the station stop there. The station is also served by many regional trains. The main destinations for trains leaving Termoli are Foggia, Campobasso, Pescara and, recently, Teramo.

The station is served by the following services (incomplete):

- High speed services (Frecciabianca) Milan - Parma - Bologna - Ancona - Pescara - Foggia - Bari - Brindisi - Lecce
- High speed services (Frecciabianca) Milan - Parma - Bologna - Ancona - Pescara - Foggia - Bari - Taranto
- High speed services (Frecciabianca) Turin - Parma - Bologna - Ancona - Pescara - Foggia - Bari - Brindisi - Lecce
- High speed services (Frecciabianca) Venice - Padua - Bologna - Ancona - Pescara - Foggia - Bari - Brindisi - Lecce
- Intercity services Bologna - Rimini - Ancona - Pescara - Foggia - Bari - Brindisi - Lecce
- Intercity services Bologna - Rimini - Ancona - Pescara - Foggia - Bari - Taranto
- Night train (Intercity Notte) Turin - Alessandria - Bologna - Ancona - Pescara - Foggia - Bari - Brindisi - Lecce

== See also ==
- History of rail transport in Italy
- List of railway stations in Molise
- Rail transport in Italy
- Railway stations in Italy
