= Paolo Gamba =

Italian painter

- Born: 1712; Ripabottoni, Molise
- Died: 1782 (aged 69–70); Ripabottoni, Molise

Paolo Gamba (29 October 1712 – 26 December 1782) was an Italian painter of the late Baroque period, active in the region of Molise. He is considered one of the most important and greatest painters from Molise.

== Biography ==
Paolo Gamba was born into a poor family in 1712 in Ripabottoni. His father, Giambattista, was a modest decorator and painter and Paolo continued his father's activity. With the help of the bishop of Larino, the young man was admitted to the school of Francesco Solimena in Naples, where he stayed from 1731 to 1737, forming his artistic technique.

Back in Molise he had an intense career travelling around the towns, working for the clergy and his patron, the Bishop of Larino. His production was mainly focused on sacred subjects which he deepened by studying the Bible. He worked in Larino, Ripabottoni, Montorio, Sant'Elia a Pianisi, Campodipietra, Colletorto, Morrone del Sannio, Fossalto; in Agnone and in Matrice. He also worked in Barrea, in Abruzzo and in Puglia. He died in 1782.

== Works ==
His first documented works were a series of frescoes (1740) in the sacristy and church of the convent of the Cappuccini in Sant'Elia a Pianisi. For the church of Santa Maria Assunta in Ripabottoni, he painted many works, including canvases depicting a Madonna of the Purgatory, Madonna of the Rosary St Roch, a 'Presentation of the Virgin at the Temple and a number of frescoes: Virtue and Prophets in medallions. For the church of Maria della Concezione in the same town, he painted an Immaculate Conception, an Assumption of the Virgin, an Annunciation, and medallions with stories of the new testament.

During 1738-1745, he painted for the parish church of Montorio nei Frentani. He painted a Madonna del Purgatorio for the church of San Giovanni Battista a Colletorto. He painted an Offering of Melchisedech for the church of Santa Maria Assunta of Fossalto. In 1771, he again painted for the church of San Francesco in Agnone. In 1774, he painted again in the church of Santa Maria Assunta of Fossalto, this time frescoes in the presbytery depicting: Sacrifice of Isaac, Transport of the Holy Ark, and Cain and Abel. In 1774, he painted an Immaculate Conception surrounded by the Evangelists in the apse of San Martino a Campodipietra. In 1779 in Matrice, he painted altarpieces for the church of Sant'Antonio depicting a Madonna del Carmelo and a Birth of the Virgin. In Larino he painted the frescoes (1747) for the cupola of the church of San Francesco, depicting the Immaculate Conception.

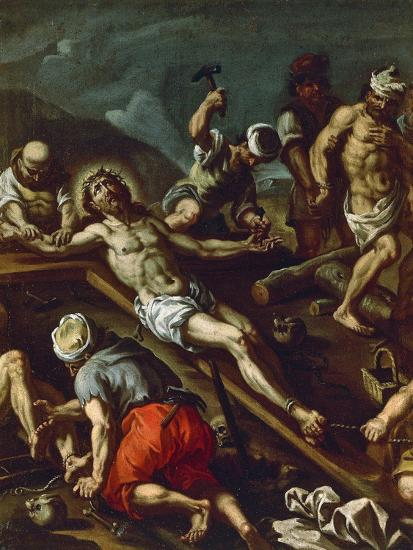
Christ being raised on the Cross

In the "Monastero di Sant'Alfonso dei Liguori" of Colletorto, there are 14 paintings of the Via Crucis by Paolo Gamba. He painted them in 1741. The canvas represent the various moments of Christ's passion and death with a strong dramatic charge.

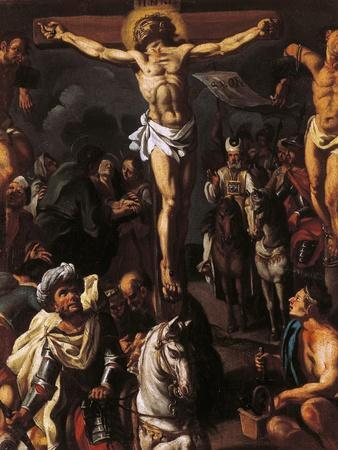
Crucifixion of Christ, one of 14 paintings of the Stations of the Cross, by Paolo Gamba
