= Larino railway station =

Railway station in Larino, Italy

Larino
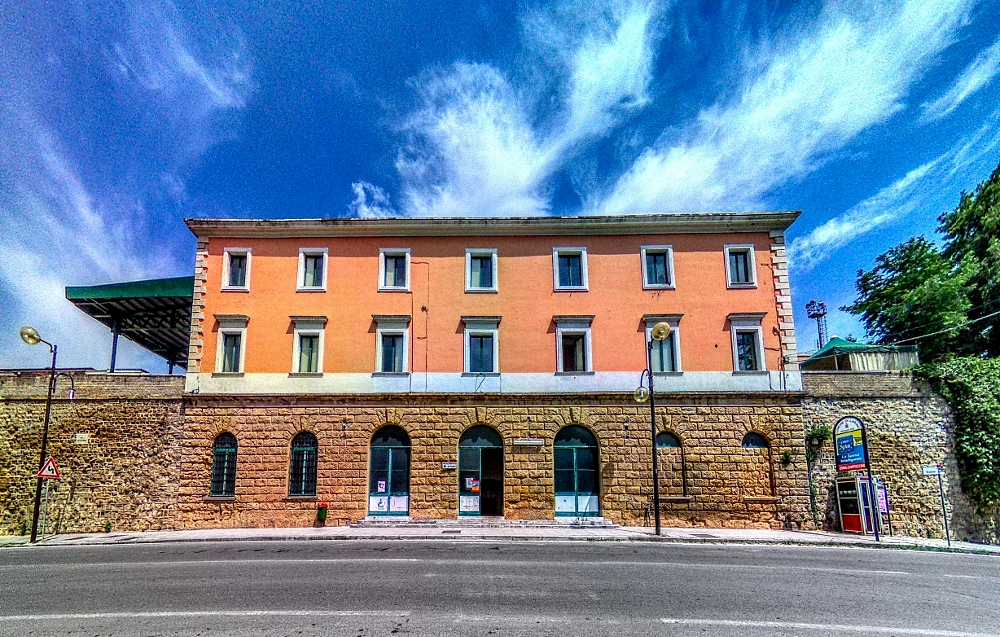

General information
- Location: Via Romano; Larino, Campobasso, Molise; Italy
- Coordinates: 41°48′00.72″N 14°55′05.16″E
- Operator: Rete Ferroviaria Italiana
- Lines: Termoli-Campobasso; Termoli–Venafro
- Platforms: 2
- Tracks: 3
- Train operators: Trenitalia

Other information
- Classification: Bronze

History
- Opened: 1882
Location
- Location within Molise Location within Italy

Larino railway station is the railway station that serves the municipality of Larino. Is situated in the centre of the city.

== Bibliography ==
- Italian railroad openings from 1839 to 1926. "Prospetto cronologico dei tratti di ferrovia aperti all'esercizio dal 1839 al 31 dicembre 1926". treni di carta (in Italian).
- Sviluppo delle ferrovie italiane dal 1839 al 31 dicembre 1926 (1927). Ferrovie dello Stato. Ufficio Centrale di Statistica (in Italian). Rome: Tipografia ditta Ludovico Cecchini.
- Rif.Legge Baccarini(L. 29 luglio 1879, n. 5002), Relazione statistica sulle costruzioni e sull'esercizio delle strade ferrate italiane per l'anno 1882 (1883). Ministero Dei Lavori Pubblici. Direzione Generale delle Strade Ferrate (in Italian). Rome: Tipografia Eredi Botta, 1883. p. 116.
