= Bonefro =

- Comune
- Comune di Bonefro
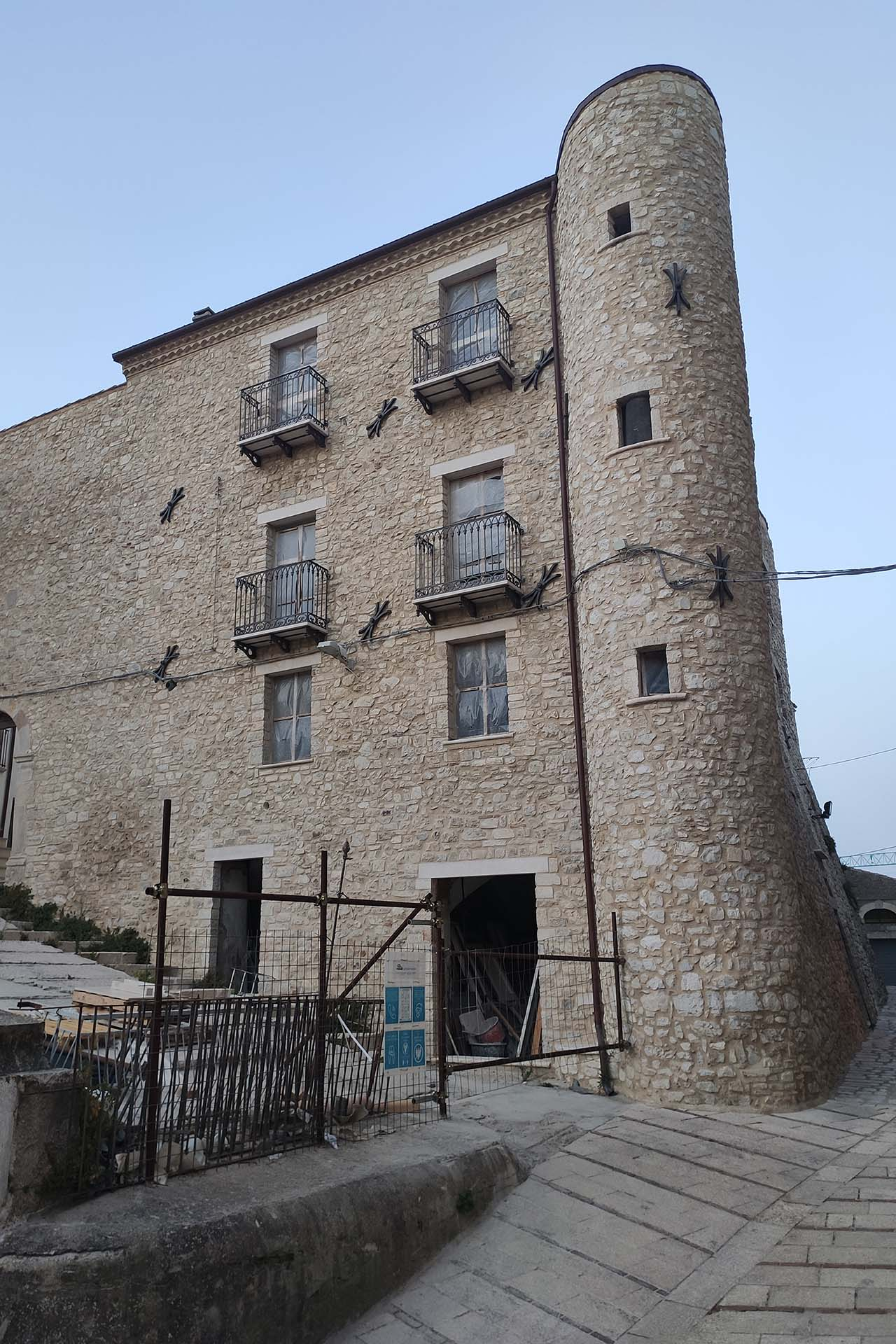
- The Castle

- Location within Italy Location within Molise
- Coordinates: 41°42′N 14°56′E
- Country: Italy
- Region: Molise
- Province: Campobasso (CB)

Government
  - Mayor: http://www.comune.casacalenda.cb.it/

Area
  - Total: 31.28 km^{2} (12.08 sq mi)
- Elevation: 631 m (2,070 ft)

Population (30 November 2017)
  - Total: 1,334
  - Density: 42.65/km^{2} (110.5/sq mi)
- Demonym: Bonefrani
- Time zone: UTC+1 (CET)
  - Summer (DST): UTC+2 (CEST)
- Postal code: 86041
- Dialing code: 0874
- Website: Official website

Bonefro is a comune (municipality) in the Province of Campobasso in the Italian region Molise, located about 25 kilometres (16 mi) northeast of Campobasso.

Bonefro borders the following municipalities: Casacalenda, Montelongo, Montorio nei Frentani, Ripabottoni, San Giuliano di Puglia, Sant'Elia a Pianisi, Santa Croce di Magliano.

In 2002, the town was in the epicenter for some of the tremors during the Molise earthquake.

== History ==
The first inhabitants of Bonefro, date back to the Lombard period (late 9th - early 10th century) even if remains belonging to previous eras have been found. However, the first definitive evidence for its existence was found in a document written in 1049, with the name Binifri (from the Latin Vinifer) or land where wine is produced. Local tradition associates the birth of the village with pilgrims heading to Apulia and leaving from Venafro, who having just arrived in the land of modern day Bonefro, were attacked by bandits and the men turned into stones and the women doves.

== Symbols ==
The coat of arms depicts Saint Nicholas, patron saint of the commune. The gonfalon is a blue cloth.

== Main sights ==
- Lombard Castle, built around the middle of the tenth century AD
- Santa Maria delle Rose, in Romanesque style (12th-13th century)
- Porta Molino, Porta Pie la Terra, Fountain Gate and Porta Nuova, gates dating back to the Lombard period.
- Convent of Santa Maria delle Grazie (1716)

== Culture ==
Bonefro hosts the annual Adriatic Chamber Music Festival (Festival di Adriatico da Musica da Camera) in July.

== Economy ==
The economy of the town is mostly agricultural however, the town has a small industrial area.

== Demographic evolution ==
Historical population

| Year | Pop. | ±% |
|---|---|---|
| 1861 | 4,396 | — |
| 1871 | 4,463 | +1.5% |
| 1881 | 4,786 | +7.2% |
| 1901 | 5,256 | +9.8% |
| 1911 | 5,395 | +2.6% |
| 1921 | 4,684 | −13.2% |

| Year | Pop. | ±% |
|---|---|---|
| 1931 | 4,707 | +0.5% |
| 1936 | 4,870 | +3.5% |
| 1951 | 5,041 | +3.5% |
| 1961 | 4,223 | −16.2% |
| 1971 | 2,759 | −34.7% |
| 1981 | 2,642 | −4.2% |

| Year | Pop. | ±% |
|---|---|---|
| 1991 | 2,166 | −18.0% |
| 2001 | 1,873 | −13.5% |
| 2011 | 1,528 | −18.4% |
| 2021 | 1,214 | −20.5% |

Source: Data from ISTAT
