= Morrone del Sannio =

- Comune
- Comune di Morrone del Sannio
- Coat of arms

- Location within Italy Location within Molise
- Coordinates: 41°43′N 14°47′E
- Country: Italy
- Region: Molise
- Province: Campobasso (CB)

Government
  - Mayor: Domenico Antonio Colasurdo

Area
  - Total: 45.6 km^{2} (17.6 sq mi)
- Elevation: 827 m (2,713 ft)

Population (31 May 2016)
  - Total: 587
  - Density: 12.9/km^{2} (33.3/sq mi)
- Demonym: Morronesi
- Time zone: UTC+1 (CET)
  - Summer (DST): UTC+2 (CEST)
- Postal code: 86040
- Dialing code: 0874
- Website: Official website

Morrone del Sannio is a comune (municipality) in the Province of Campobasso in the Italian region Molise, located about 20 kilometres (12 mi) northeast of Campobasso.

== Geography ==
Morrone del Sannio borders the following municipalities: Campolieto, Casacalenda, Castelbottaccio, Castellino del Biferno, Lucito, Lupara, Provvidenti, Ripabottoni.

== Main sights ==
- Remains of a Roman villa and of the abbey of Casalpiano
- 15th century convent of St. Nazarius
- Church of Santa Maria Maggiore (18th century)
