= Ripabottoni =

- Comune
- Comune di Ripabottoni
- Location within Italy Location within Molise
- Coordinates: 41°41′N 14°49′E
- Country: Italy
- Region: Molise
- Province: Province of Campobasso (CB)

Area
  - Total: 31.9 km^{2} (12.3 sq mi)
- Elevation: 695 m (2,280 ft)

Population (Dec. 2004)
  - Total: 644
  - Density: 20.2/km^{2} (52.3/sq mi)
- Time zone: UTC+1 (CET)
  - Summer (DST): UTC+2 (CEST)
- Postal code: 86040
- Dialing code: 0874
- Patron saint: Saint Rocco
- Saint day: August 16

Ripabottoni is a comune (municipality) in the Province of Campobasso in the Italian region Molise, located about 20 kilometres (12 mi) northeast of Campobasso. As of 31 December 2004, it had a population of 644 and an area of 31.9 square kilometres (12.3 mi^{2}).

Ripabottoni borders the following municipalities: Bonefro, Campolieto, Casacalenda, Monacilioni, Morrone del Sannio, Provvidenti, Sant'Elia a Pianisi.

== Famous People from Ripabottoni ==
- Arturo Giovannitti, labor organizer in the United States, born in Ripabottoni
- Tony Volpentest, his paternal family came from Ripabottoni, the original name was Volpentesta.
- Paolo Gamba, Italian painter from Ripabottoni

== Transportation ==
Ripabottoni is served by a railway station, the Ripabottoni-Sant'Elia railway station, on the Termoli-Campobasso and Termoli–Venafro line.

== Demographic evolution ==
Historical population

Year	Pop.	±%
1861	4,425	—
1871	4,892	+10.6%
1881	4,937	+0.9%
1901	4,391	−11.1%
1911	3,590	−18.2%

Year	Pop.	±%
1921	3,169	−11.7%
1931	2,850	−10.1%
1936	2,873	+0.8%
1951	2,723	−5.2%
1961	1,749	−35.8%

Year	Pop.	±%
1971	1,189	−32.0%
1981	985	−17.2%
1991	814	−17.4%
2001	673	−17.3%

Source: Data from ISTAT
