= Provvidenti =

- Comune
- Comune di Provvidenti
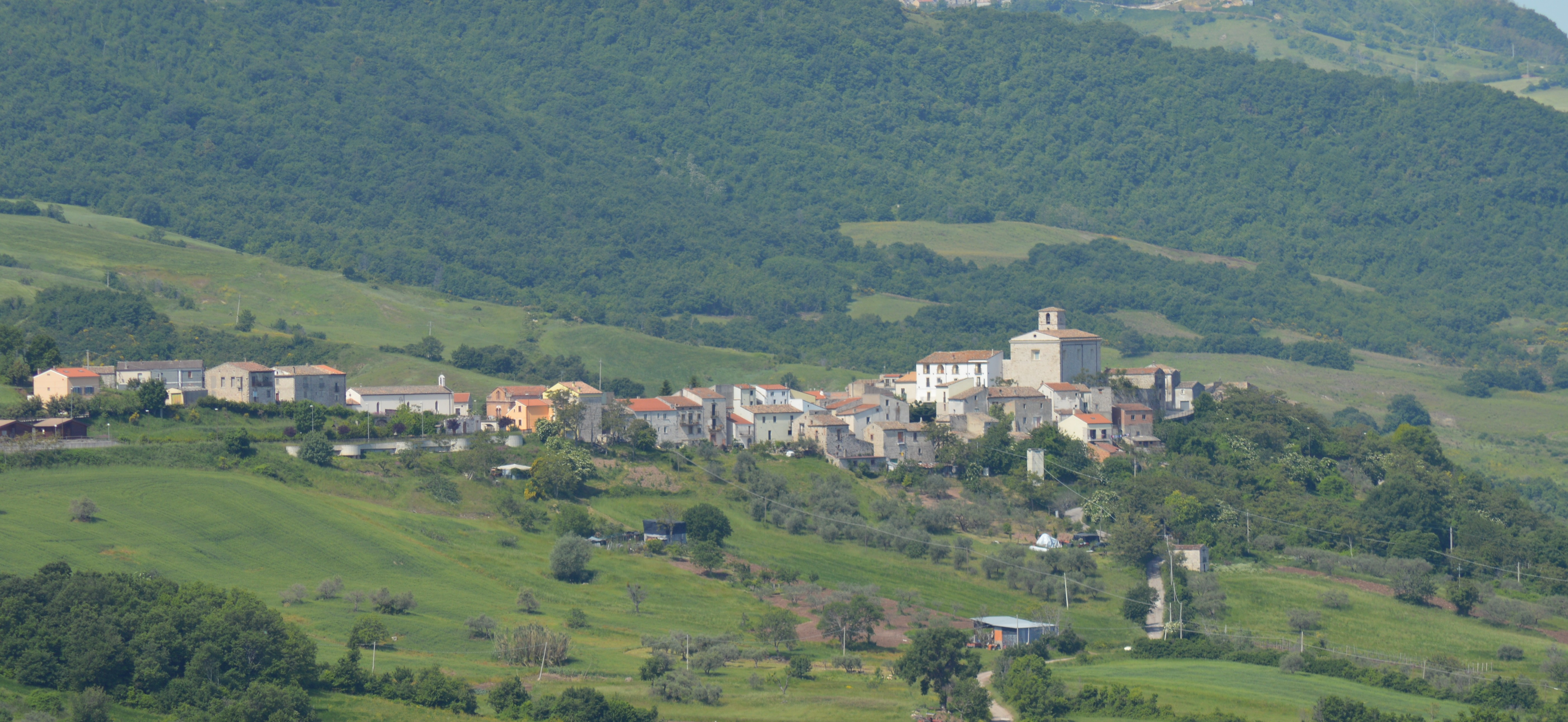
- View of Provvidenti

- Location within Italy Location within Molise
- Coordinates: 41°43′N 14°49′E
- Country: Italy
- Region: Molise
- Province: Campobasso (CB)

Government
  - Mayor: Robert Caporicci

Area
  - Total: 14.03 km^{2} (5.42 sq mi)
- Elevation: 570 m (1,870 ft)

Population (30 November 2017)
  - Total: 113
  - Density: 8.05/km^{2} (20.9/sq mi)
- Demonym: Provvidentesi
- Time zone: UTC+1 (CET)
  - Summer (DST): UTC+2 (CEST)
- Postal code: 86040
- Dialing code: 0874
- Website: Official website

Provvidenti is a comune (municipality) in the Province of Campobasso in the Italian region Molise, located about 20 kilometres (12 mi) northeast of Campobasso. Provvidenti is the town with the smallest population in the province of Campobasso.

Provvidenti borders the following municipalities: Casacalenda, Morrone del Sannio, Ripabottoni.

== Emigration ==
Since the end of World War II until the late 1960s, the town's population declined considerably due to emigration. The place of choice for many of these emigrants was the Canadian city of Montreal. Montreal even has its own Provvidenti Association.

== Borgo della Musica ==
In 2006 a group of young music-managers and artists, deciding to establish a special place for creativity in the artistic sector, selected Provvidenti as Borgo della Musica ("Village of Music"). As of 2017 the project is suspended.
