= San Giuliano di Puglia =

- Comune
- Comune di San Giuliano di Puglia
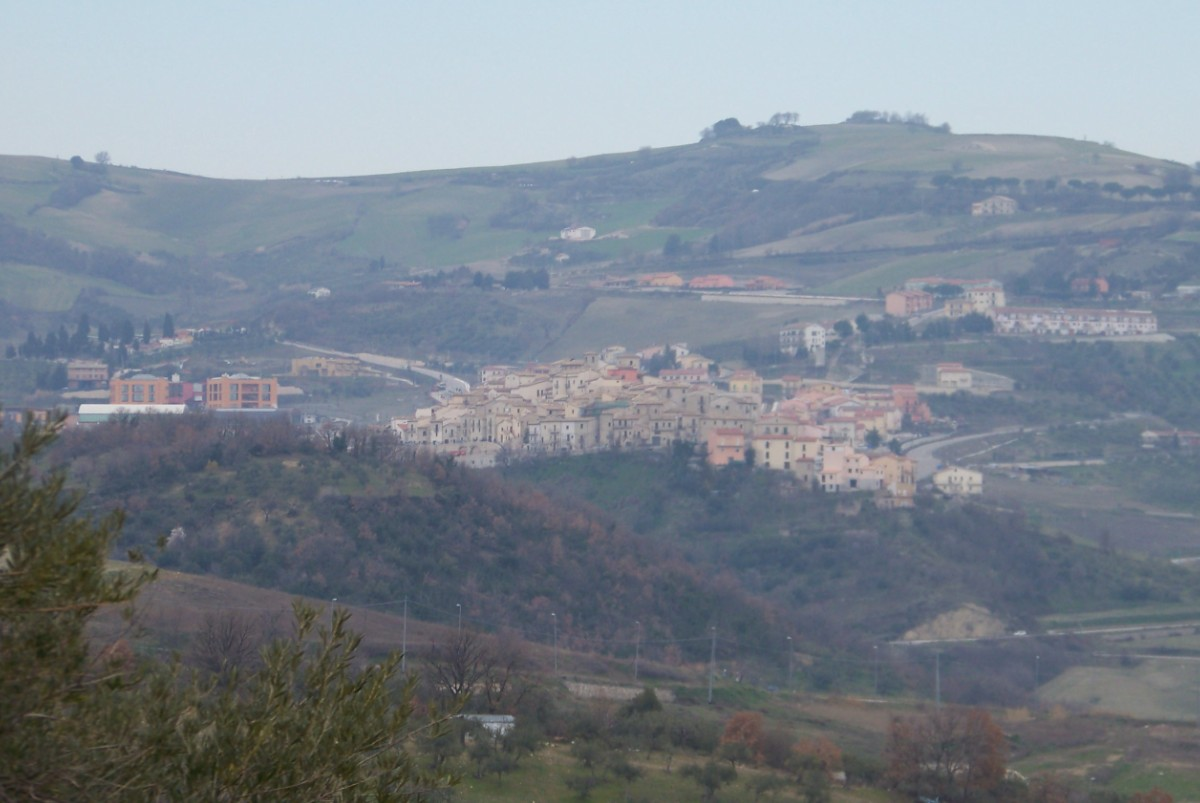
- View of San Giuliano di Puglia

- Location within Italy Location within Molise
- Coordinates: 41°41′N 14°58′E
- Country: Italy
- Region: Molise
- Province: Campobasso (CA)

Government
  - Mayor: Luigi Barbieri

Area
  - Total: 42.05 km^{2} (16.24 sq mi)
- Elevation: 453 m (1,486 ft)

Population (30 November 2017)
  - Total: 1,027
  - Density: 24.42/km^{2} (63.26/sq mi)
- Demonym: Sangulianesi
- Time zone: UTC+1 (CET)
  - Summer (DST): UTC+2 (CEST)
- Postal code: 86040
- Patron saint: St. Julian
- Saint day: 21 May
- Website: Official website

San Giuliano di Puglia is a small town and comune in the province of Campobasso, in the region of Molise, in Italy.

Even though it is now part of Molise, its name still recalls its former administrative and cultural association with the region of Apulia (Puglia).

It is mainly an agricultural centre.

== 2002 earthquake ==
On 31 October 2002, the town was severely damaged by an earthquake.

The event provoked the collapse of the local school, in which 26 of the 51 pupils lost their lives, together with one of their teachers. None of the 9 boys of the 4th class (born in 1996) survived.

The quake was the first seismic event on this site, and the town was not included in any seismic map for preventive protection purposes.
