= Montorio nei Frentani =

- Comune
- Comune di Montorio nei Frentani
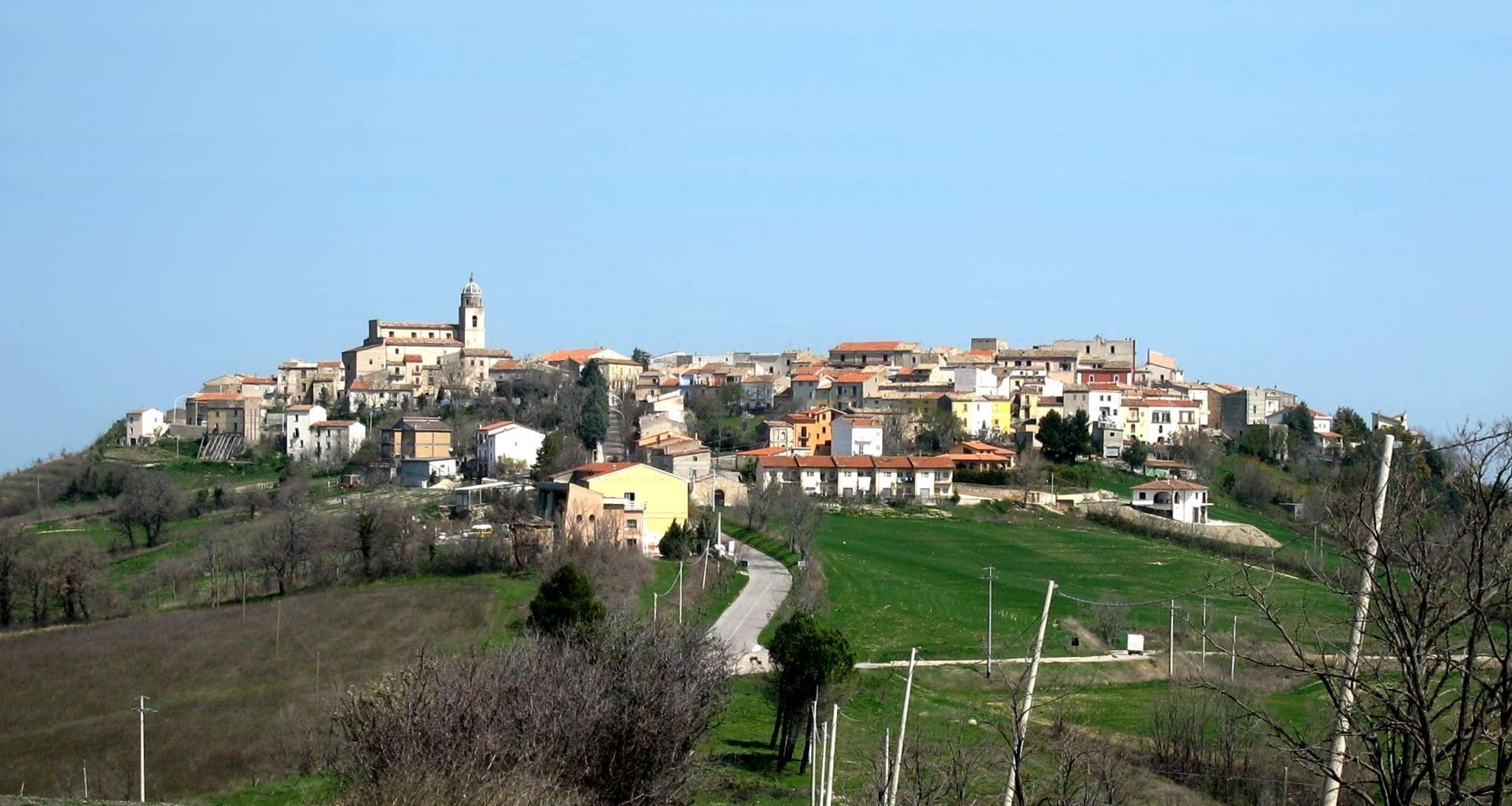
- Panorama of Montorio nei Frentani

- Location within Italy Location within Molise
- Coordinates: 41°45′N 14°56′E
- Country: Italy
- Region: Molise
- Province: Campobasso (CB)

Government
  - Mayor: Pellegrino Nino Ponte

Area
  - Total: 31 km^{2} (12 sq mi)
- Elevation: 654 m (2,146 ft)

Population (30 November 2017)
  - Total: 407
  - Density: 13/km^{2} (34/sq mi)
- Demonym: Montoriesi
- Time zone: UTC+1 (CET)
  - Summer (DST): UTC+2 (CEST)
- Postal code: 86040
- Dialing code: 0874
- Website: Official website

Montorio nei Frentani (Campobassan dialect: Mundòrj) is a small town and comune in the province of Campobasso (Molise), in Southern Italy.

== Churches ==
- Santa Maria Assunta
