= Termoli–Venafro railway =

Railway line in Italy

Overview
- Status: in use
- Owner: RFI
- Locale: Molise, Italy
- Termini: Termoli; Venafro

Service
- Type: Heavy rail
- Operator(s): Trenitalia

History
- Opened: 14 June 1900

Technical
- Line length: 169 km (105 mi)
- Number of tracks: 1
- Track gauge: 1,435 mm (4 ft 8 1/2 in) standard gauge
- Electrification: no
- Operating speed: 120 km/h (75 mph)

The Termoli–Venafro railway is a railway line in Molise, Italy.

== History ==
The line was opened in different sections between 1886 and 1900.

== See also ==
- Termoli-Campobasso Railway
- List of railway lines in Italy

== Bibliography ==
- RFI - Fascicolo linea 127
