= Monteveglio =

- Frazione
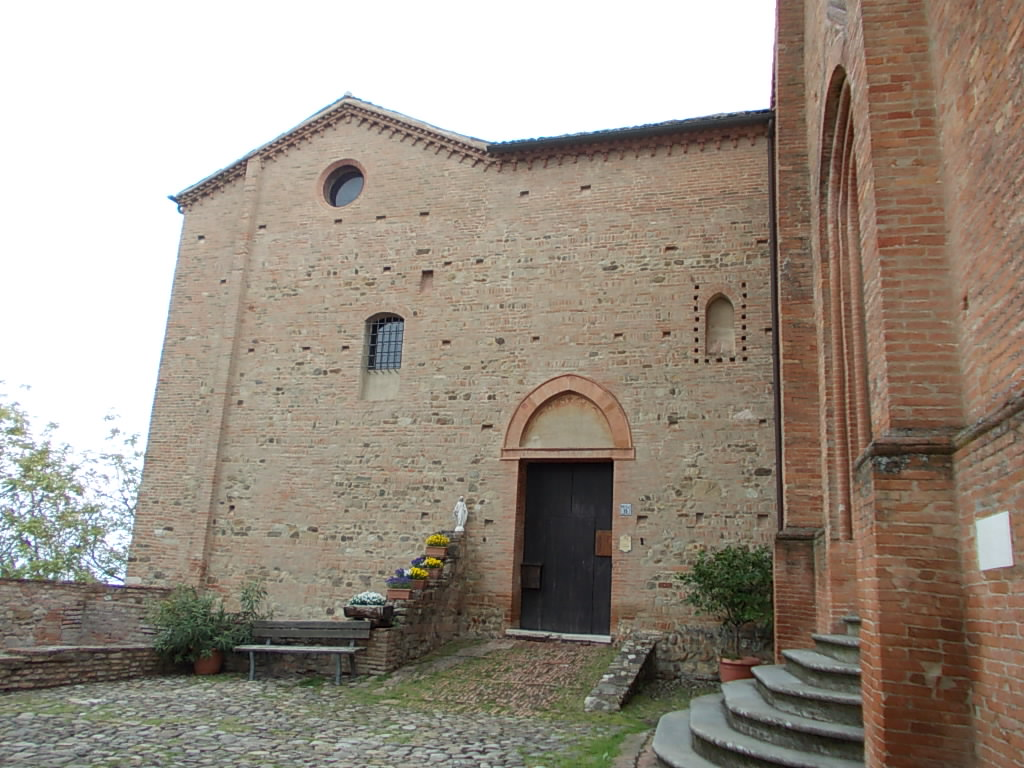
- Abbazia di Santa Maria in Monteveglio

- Location of Monteveglio in Italy
- Coordinates: 44°28′0″N 11°5′0″E
- Country: Italy
- Region: Emilia-Romagna
- Metropolitan city: Bologna
- Comune: Valsamoggia
- Elevation: 117 m (384 ft)

Population (2010)
  - Total: 5,286
- Demonym: Montevegliesi
- Time zone: UTC+1 (CET)
  - Summer (DST): UTC+2 (CEST)
- Postal code: 40050
- Patron saint: San Rocco
- Saint day: August 16th
- Website: https://www.comune.valsamoggia.bo.it/

Monteveglio (Muntvì or Måntvî in the western Bolognese dialect) is a frazione (village) in the comune (municipality) of Valsamoggia. It is located about 20 kilometres (12 mi) west of Bologna, near the Samoggia River, in the Italian region of Emilia-Romagna. It was an independent comune until 2014, when it merged with the neighboring municipalities of Bazzano, Valsamoggia, Castello di Serravalle, Crespellano, and Savigno. Monteveglio's main attractions are its pieve of Santa Maria and Oratory of San Rocco.

== Etymology ==
The name Monteveglio may have come from the Latin mons belli, "mountain of war". However, though phonetically feasible, this view lacks documentary evidence, and archaeologically there is no evidence of Roman fortification or a garrison in the area. More likely is that Monteveglio is a corruption of Montebello, "beautiful mountain".

== History ==
=== Ancient era ===
The lands surrounding the Samoggia River have been inhabited since the Neolithic era, as evidenced by archaeological finds now visible in the Archaeological Museum of Bazzano. Settlement at Monteveglio, however, only certainly dates back to the 1st century AD. At this time, there were Roman villas in the area of the modern abbey. Very little remains of them. Only one building in the village today bears the remains of Roman facades and columns.

=== Middle Ages ===
During the Middle Ages, Monteveglio, along with other settlements, became part of a system of fortifications between the Samoggia and Panaro rivers, protecting inner Italy from the Lombards until the final conquest of Liutprand in 727. In 728, Monteveglio joined the Duchy of Persiceta.

In the 11th century, Monteveglio was fundamental in Countess Matilda of Tuscany's desperate resistance to Holy Roman Emperor Henry IV's invasion of Italy, after his humiliating defeat to Pope Gregory VII at Canossa. Supposedly, it was the death of the Emperor's son in the battle at Monteveglio that proved the strength of the papal forces and prompted the invaders to retreat.

=== 21st century ===
In 2008, Monteveglio was the first Italian municipality to be recognized as a transition town. Since 2009, it has been part of the Union of Common Samoggia Valleys.

On 25 November 2012, a referendum was held, proposing merging Monteveglio with the neighbouring municipalities of Bazzano, Castello di Serravalle, Crespellano, and Savigno. The result was a "yes" vote of 51.5%. On 1 January 2014 the municipality of Valsamoggia was established.

== Geography ==
Monteveglio is located in the Bolognese Apennines. The territory is hilly, characterized by extensive forest cover alternating with arable land. There are also badland areas characterized by intense erosion. Over the last century, Monteveglio expanded onto the foot of the 260-meter hill on which its abbey and medieval fortifications are located.

"Abbey Hill" and the surrounding 900 hectares constitute the "Monteveglio Abbey Regional Park", which is rich in local wildlife, especially birds.
