= Santa Maria Assunta in Cielo =

Santa Maria Assunta in Cielo may refer to the following churches in Italy:

- Santa Maria Assunta in Cielo, Alviano, in Terni, Umbria
- Santa Maria Assunta in Cielo, Cantalupo in Sabina, in Rieti, Lazio
- Santa Maria Assunta in Cielo, Roccantica, in Rieti, Lazio
- Santa Maria Assunta in Cielo, Vitorchiano, in Viterbo, Lazio
- Fermo Cathedral or Cattedrale metropolitana di Santa Maria Assunta in Cielo, in Fermo, Marche
- Santa Maria della Celestia or Santa Maria Assunta in Cielo, in Venice

== See also ==
- List of churches consecrated to Santa Maria Assunta
