= List of churches consecrated to Santa Maria Assunta =

Churches consecrated to Santa Maria Assunta (Saint Mary of the Assumption) include:

- Santa Maria Assunta, Acerra Cathedral
- Santa Maria Assunta, Acqui Terme Cathedral
- Santa Maria Assunta, Altamura, Province of Bari, Puglia
- Basilica di Santa Maria Assunta, Aquileia, a church in Aquileia, province of Udine, Friuli-Venezia Giulia
- Parish Church of the Assumption of Mary, Għaxaq, Malta
- Parish Church of the Assumption of Mary, Żebbuġ, Gozo, Malta
- Basilica di Santa Maria Assunta, Muggia
- Cremona Cathedral, a cathedral in Cremona, Lombardy
- Church of Santa Maria Assunta (Esine), a church near Esine, province of Brescia, Lombardy
- Santa Maria Assunta, Gaeta cathedral
- Santa Maria Assunta, Guardialfiera. Province of Campobasso, Molise
- Maria Santissima Assunta, Gravina di Puglia co-cathedral, Province of Bari
- Santa Maria Assunta di La Verna La Verna basilica-sanctuary of in the Tuscan Apennines
- Abbey of Monteveglio
- Naples Cathedral
- Orvieto Cathedral
- Ostuni Cathedral
- Piacenza Cathedral (Santa Giustina e Santa Maria Assunta)
- Santa Maria Assunta, Pisa cathedral, Tuscany
- Santa Maria Assunta, Randazzo basilica church, Sicily
- Santa Maria Assunta, Riola di Vergato
- Santa Maria Assunta, Siena cathedral, Tuscany
- Santa Maria Assunta, Spoleto cathedral
- Santa Maria Assunta, Torcello basilica church, island near Venice, Veneto
- Santa Maria dei Carmini, formerly known as Santa Maria Assunta, Venice, Veneto
- Church of Santa Maria Assunta, a church in Castelfranco Emilia, province of Modena, Emilia-Romagna
- Church of Santa Maria Assunta, Pietrabbondante, province of Isernia, Molise
- I Gesuiti, Venice, a religious building in Venice, Veneto
- Santa Maria Assunta, Genoa, a church in Genoa, Liguria
- Lucciana Cathedral, a cathedral in Lucciana, Haute-Corse, Corsica
- Saint-Florent Cathedral, a former cathedral in Saint-Florent, Haute-Corse, Corsica
- Santa Maria Assunta, is a Romanesque-style church in Villa Basilica, Tuscany, Italy

== See also ==
- Santa Maria Assunta in Cielo (disambiguation)
- Cathedral of Santa Maria Assunta (disambiguation)
- Church of Nuestra Señora de la Asunción (disambiguation)
- Church of the Assumption (disambiguation)
