= Guardialfiera =

- Comune
- Comune di Guardialfiera
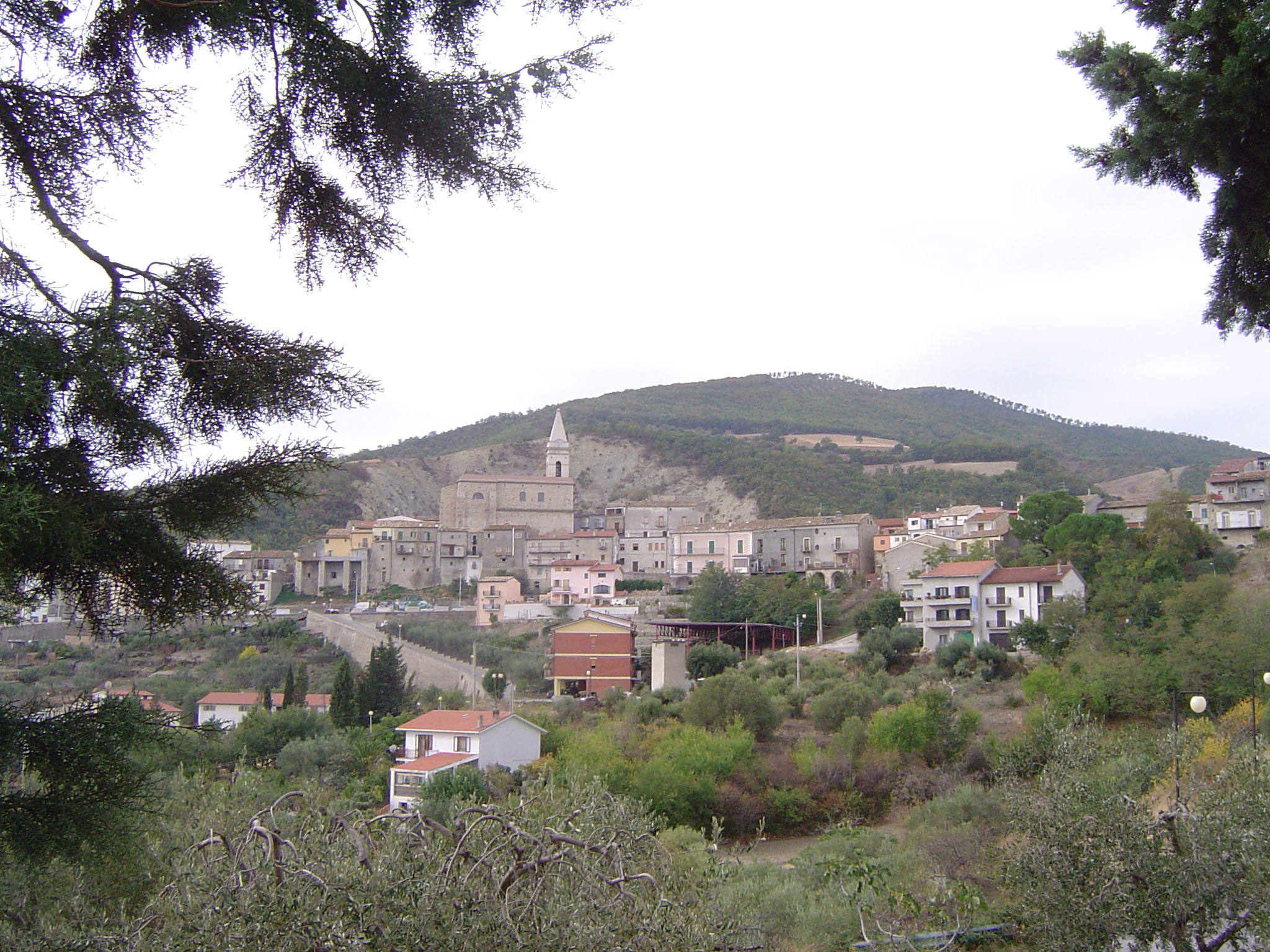
- Guardialfiera skyline

- Location within Italy Location within Molise
- Coordinates: 41°48′N 14°48′E
- Country: Italy
- Region: Molise
- Province: Campobasso (CB)

Government
  - Mayor: Vincenzo Tozzi

Area
  - Total: 43.2 km^{2} (16.7 sq mi)
- Elevation: 274 m (899 ft)

Population (30 November 2017)
  - Total: 1,048
  - Density: 24.3/km^{2} (62.8/sq mi)
- Demonym: Guardiesi or Guardioli
- Time zone: UTC+1 (CET)
  - Summer (DST): UTC+2 (CEST)
- Postal code: 86030
- Dialing code: 0874
- Patron saint: Saint Gaudentius
- Saint day: June 1st and 2nd
- Website: Official website

Guardialfiera is a comune (municipality) in the Province of Campobasso in the Italian region Molise, located about 30 kilometres (19 mi) northeast of Campobasso. It sits on a hilltop overlooking Lake Guardialfiera, which was created as a result of the damming of the Biferno river.

Guardialfiera borders the following municipalities: Acquaviva Collecroce, Casacalenda, Castelmauro, Civitacampomarano, Larino, Lupara, Palata.

== History ==
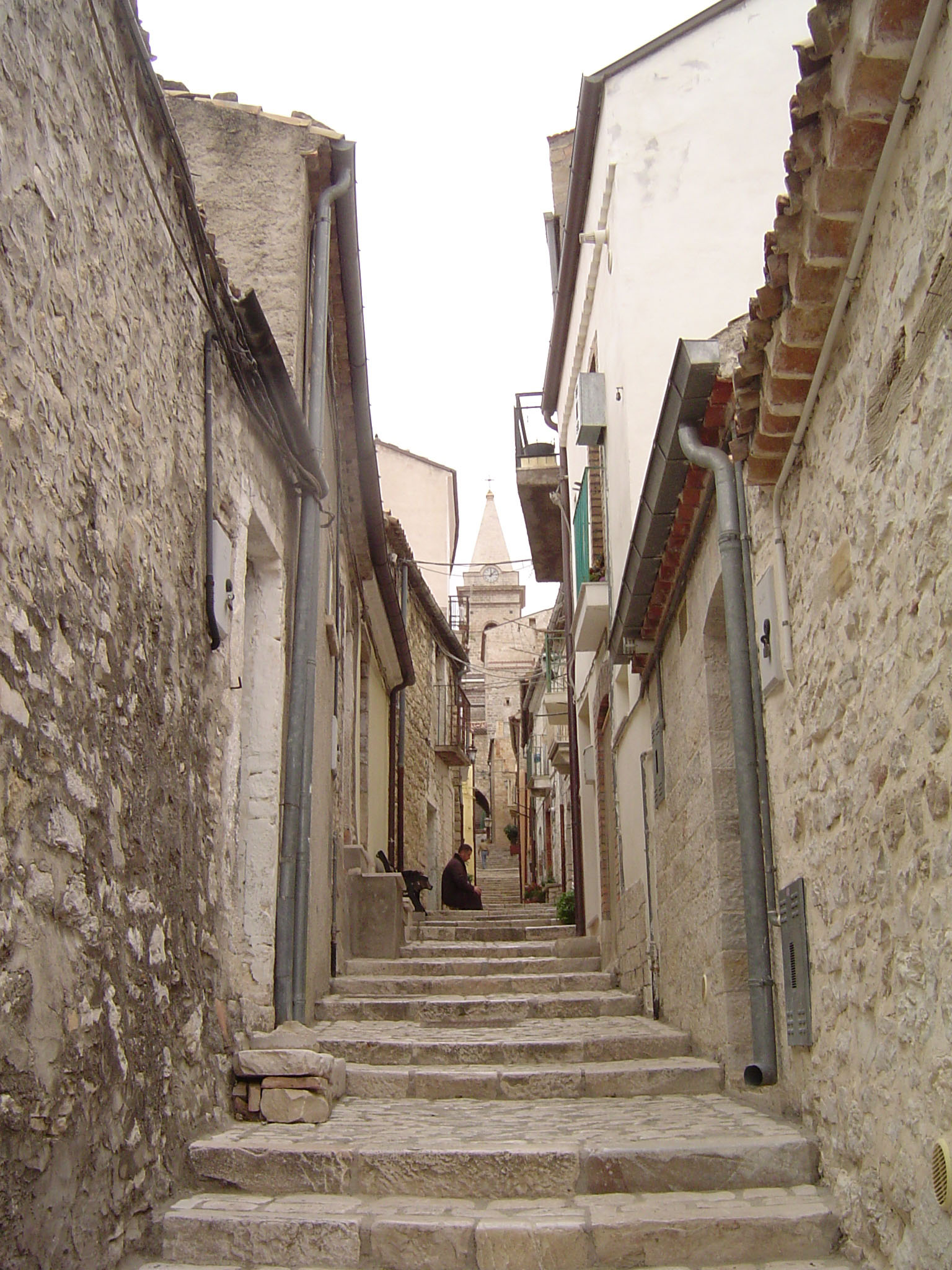
Via Carlo Romeo in the old section of Guardialfiera

The town of Guardialfiera has been continuously inhabited since at least the 11th century. Reports exist that a Roman tower was visible on the western edge of the town until the 10th century. The origin of the town's name is uncertain, although it is likely that the name is derived from either the “Guards of Alfier” or the “Guards of Adalferio”, named after the Lombard ruler of Larino who in 1049 conquered the town.

In 1053 it is likely that Pope Leo IX used Guardialfiera as a base in order to launch an attack against the Normans who had occupied the nearby town of Larino in 1050. On June 18, 1053, the Norman Count of Apulia, Humphrey of Hauteville, defeated Pope Leo IX at the Battle of Civitate. The Episcopal Seat of Guardialfiera was established in 1061 by Pope Alexander II likely in recognition of the town's role in the events of 1053.

In 1130 the town was conquered by the Norman king Roger II of Sicily. Subsequently, it was ruled by the Soliaco family until 1350, then the Marzano family. In 1550 the land passed to the Di Capua family then to the De Blasiis and in 1636 the Ferri, rulers of Lupara. In 1649 the last of the Ferri family died without any heirs and Guardialfiera was donated to Serafino Biscardi. In 1688 the town was rebuilt after it was completely destroyed by an earthquake. Constantino Lemaitre bought the town's land in 1793 in order to gain the title of Marquis. The Lemaitre family were the last feudal lords to control Guardialfiera when the feudal system was suppressed in 1806.

In the early part of the 20th century many individuals emigrated from Guardialfiera, to North America, especially to Montreal, Quebec, Canada and Sudbury, Ontario, Canada. Many also emigrated to South America, Buenos Aires, Córdoba and Mar del Plata.

== Santa Maria Assunta, Guardialfiera ==
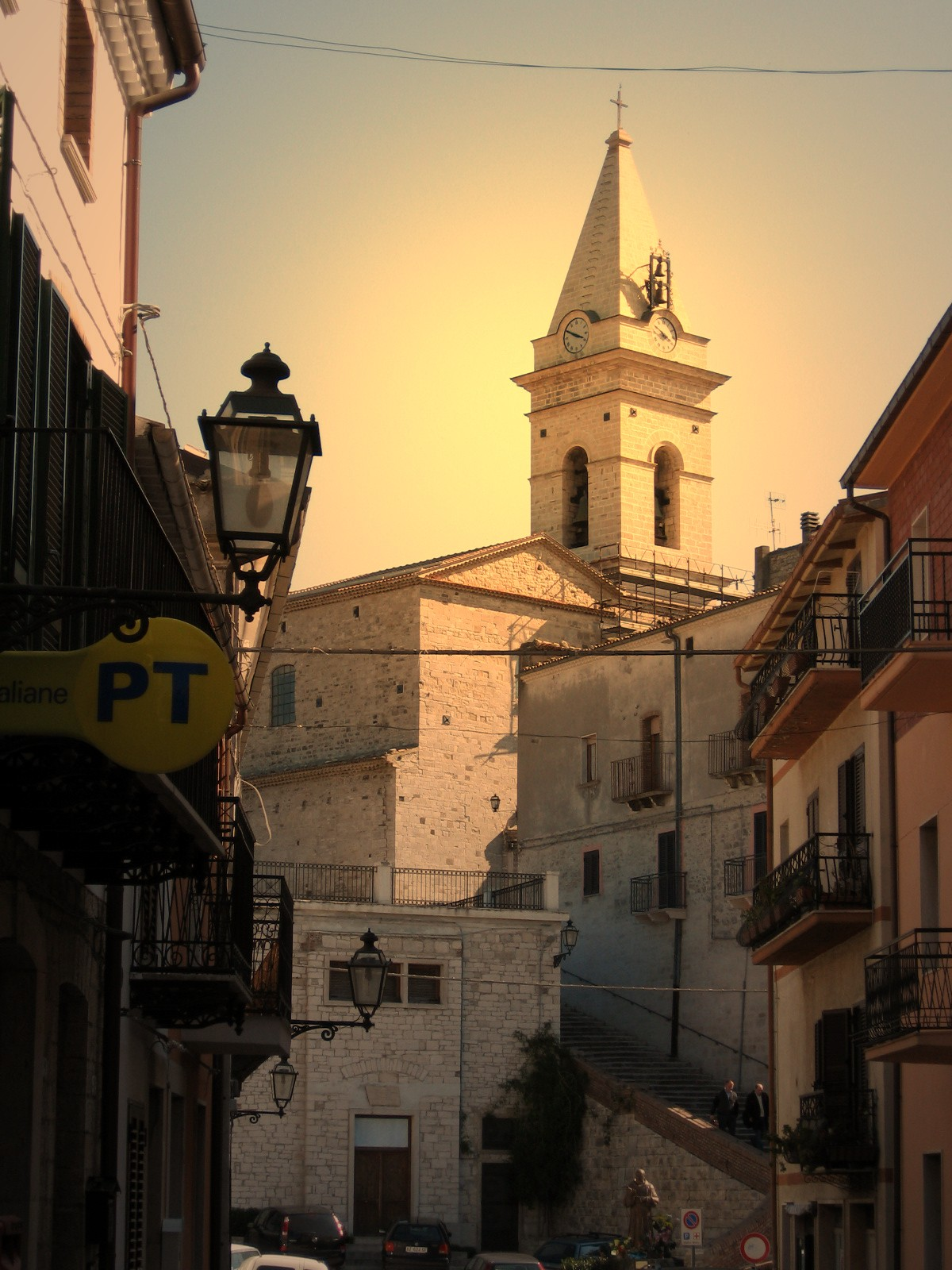
Santa Maria Assunta

The town's main church, Santa Maria Assunta, dates to at least the 11th century. Many ancient stones carved with pagan and early Christian iconographs dating to the 7th and 8th centuries were incorporated into the present structure. It was likely that these stones were part of a pagan temple that originally sat on the same site. It is unclear if the present structure was standing at the time of Pope Leo IX’s visit in 1053, but the diocese records clearly show that the designation of Santa Maria dell'Assunta was elevated to a cathedral in 1061 and was presided over a bishop by the name of Peter.

On April 7, 1751, relics of Saint Gaudentius (San Gaudenzio) were transported by two Capuchin friars from the catacombs of St. Priscilla to the Cathedral in Guardialfiera. These were given to Mons. Pasquale Zaini, the Bishop of Guardialfiera, by Pope Benedict XIV. The relics can still be seen today in Santa Maria dell'Assunta and are paraded through the town on the feast of San Gaudenzio (1 and 2 June). It remains unclear who exactly Saint Gaudentius was, although from historical texts he is referred to as a martyr. It has been alternatively claimed that he was either the architect who designed the Flavian Amphitheater in Rome (also known as the "Colosseum"), or Saint Gaudentius of Rimini.

After an earthquake in 1456, the cathedral was rebuilt and in 1460 a Holy Door (Porta Santa) was added to the north-east facing wall of the cathedral by Bishop Jacopo. This is one of the few Holy Doors outside of Rome and is opened once every year during the feast of San Gaudenzio except during Jubilee Years when the Holy Doors in Rome are opened.

In 1975 a medieval crypt was discovered during the restoration of the cathedral.

== Lake Guardialfiera ==
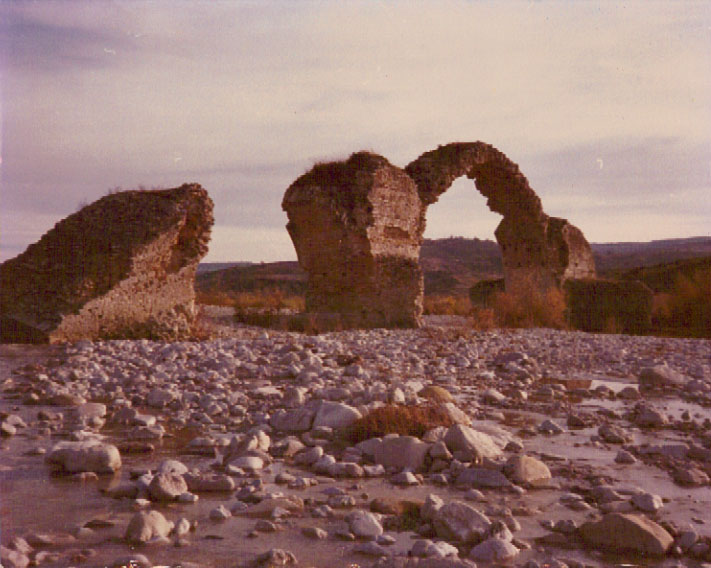
Bridge of Saint Anthony, photographed in 1972

Guardialfiera overlooks the artificial Lake Guardialfiera, which was created due to damming of the Biferno river in 1976–77. In ancient Roman times, the river was known as Tifernus. The rising waters of the lake submerged the ruins of the bridge of Saint Anthony (also called the bridge of Hannibal). It is believed by locals to be of Etruscan origin, but more likely was built by the Romans, and was visible just north of the town. According to local lore, Hannibal used this bridge to move his army across the Biferno. Photos, murals and statues of the bridge can be seen throughout Guardialfiera.

== People ==
- Francesco Jovine (Guardialfiera, October 9, 1902 – Rome, April 30, 1950), writer
- Carlo Romeo (Guardialfiera, 1755 – Naples, December 12, 1799), lawyer and member of the Neapolitan Republic of 1799. He was executed in Naples following the Bourbon repression after the fall of the republic.

== Transportation ==
Guardialfiera is served by a railway station, the Casacalenda-Guardalfiera railway station, on the Termoli-Campobasso and Termoli–Venafro line.

== See also ==
- Roman Catholic Diocese of Guardialfiera
