= Lago di Guardialfiera =

Lake in Molise, Italy

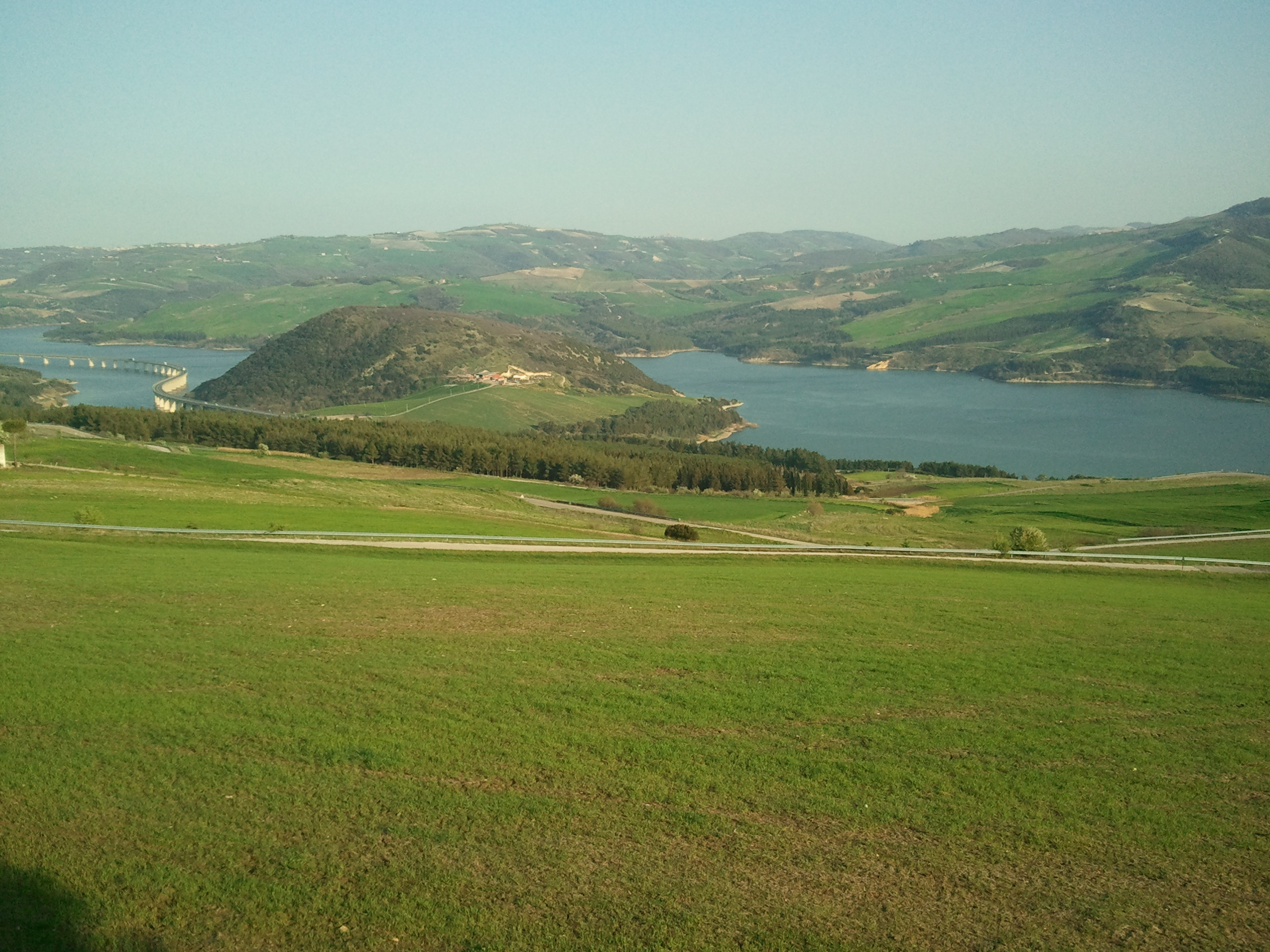
- Looking across on Lago di Guardialfiera

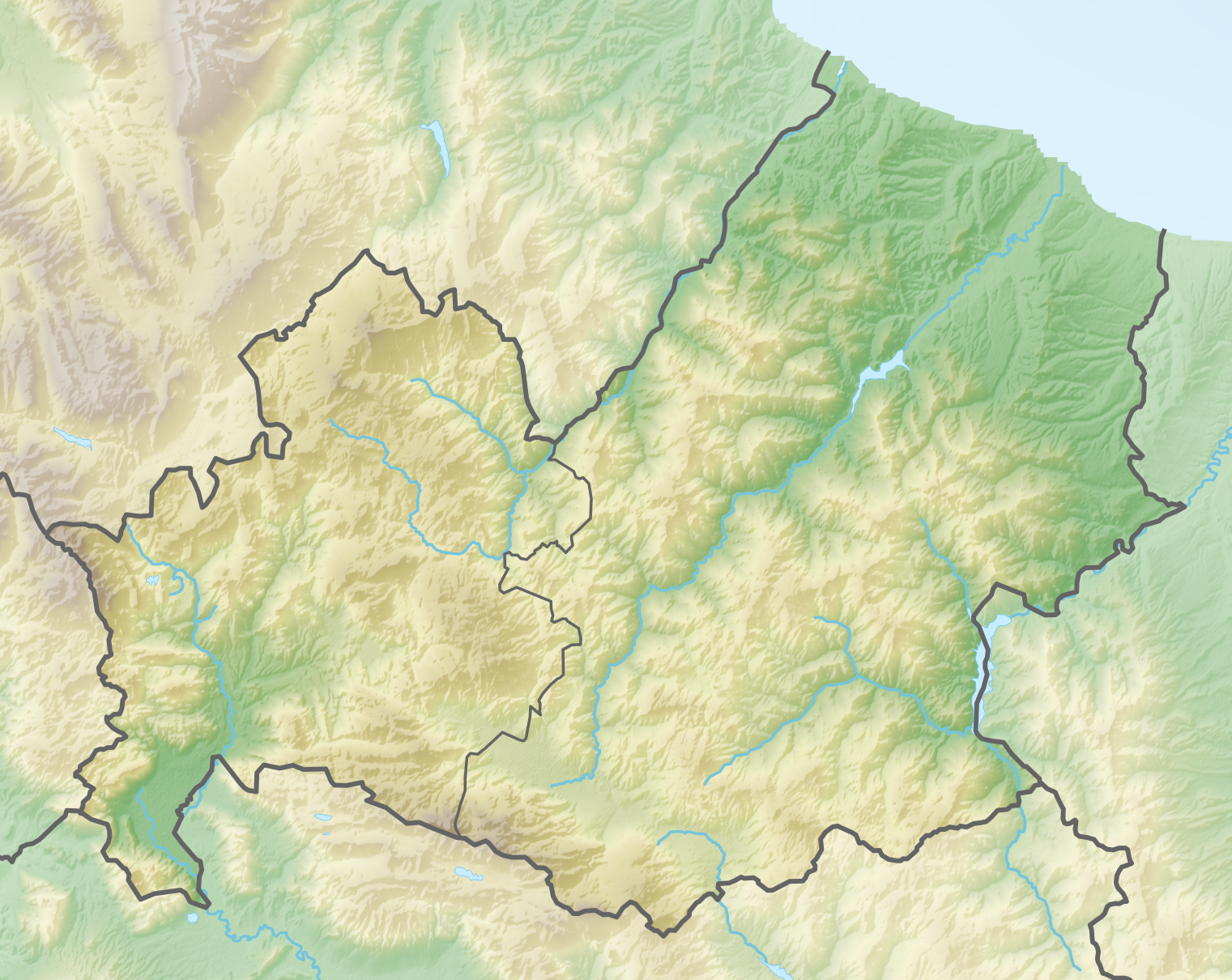
- Location within Molise
- Location: Province of Campobasso, Molise
- Coordinates: 41.813035°N 14.834633°E
- Basin countries: Italy
- Surface area: 7.45 square kilometres (2.88 sq mi)

Lago di Guardialfiera is a lake in the Province of Campobasso, Molise, Italy. The lake is a reservoir that was initially built by damming the Biferno river in the 1970s for agricultural and industrial purposes. The area around the lake is surrounded by hills and villages.

Neighbouring communes are Guardialfiera, Larino, Lupara, Acquaviva Collecroce, Palata, Montecilfone, Montorio nei Frentani, and Casacalenda.

== Wildlife ==
The wildlife inside of the lake includes:

- Carp
- Chub
- Northern Pike
- Largemouth bass
- Eels
- Catfish
- Trout
