= Cathedral of Santa Maria Assunta =

The Cathedral of Santa Maria Assunta is the name of several churches consecrated to Santa Maria Assunta. It may refer to:

- Acerenza Cathedral
- Acerra Cathedral
- Acqui Cathedral
- Ajaccio Cathedral
- Alife Cathedral
- Altamura Cathedral
- Andria Cathedral
- Aosta Cathedral
- Benevento Cathedral
- Chioggia Cathedral, the main place of worship in Chioggia, from 1627
- Cortona Cathedral
- Crema Cathedral
- Cremona Cathedral
- Foggia Cathedral
- Lucciana Cathedral
- Lucera Cathedral
- Naples Cathedral
- New Cathedral, Brescia
- Novara Cathedral
- Old Cathedral, Brescia
- Oristano Cathedral
- Orvieto Cathedral
- Padua Cathedral
- Sarzana Cathedral
- Siena Cathedral
- Teramo Cathedral
- Terni Cathedral
- Torcello Cathedral, a basilica church on the island of Torcello, Venice, from 639
- Troia Cathedral
- Urbino Cathedral
- Venafro Cathedral
