= Saint Otto =

Saint Otto or Blessed Otto may refer to:

- Saint Ottone Frangipane (died 1127), Italian monk and hermit
- Saint Otto of Bamberg (died 1139), German missionary and bishop
- Blessed Otto of Freising (died 1158), German bishop and historian
- Saint Otto (died 1220), Franciscan martyred in Morocco with four companions
- Blessed Otto Neururer (1882–1940), Austrian priest who died in a Nazi concentration camp
