= Passive revolution =

Years-long change in political order, in Gramscian discourse

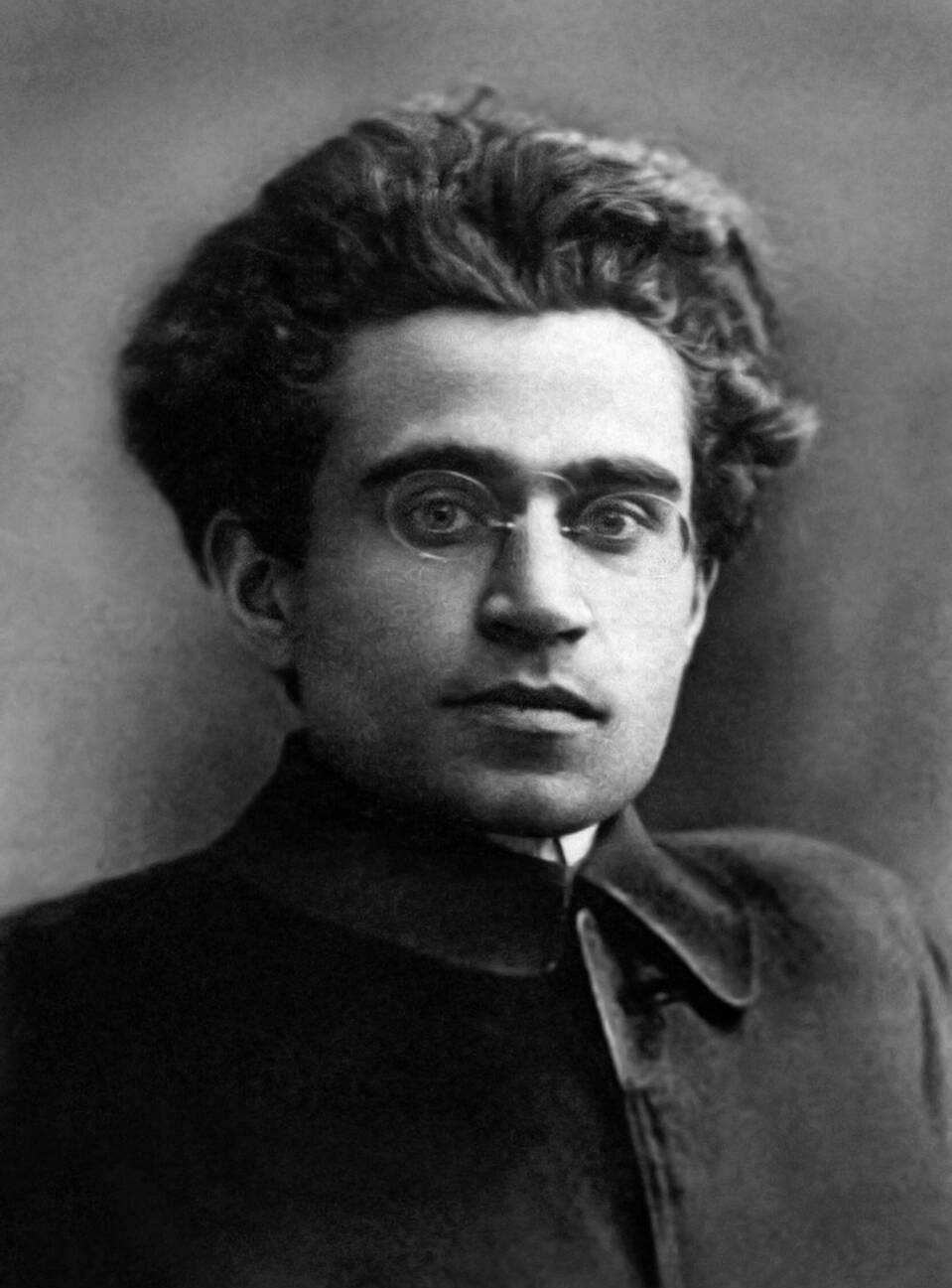
Italian Marxist intellectual Antonio Gramsci, who coined the term passive revolution.

Passive revolution is a transformation of the political and institutional structures without strong social processes by ruling classes for their own self-preservation. The phrase was coined by the Marxist politician and philosopher Antonio Gramsci during the interwar period in Italy.

== Background ==
The expression passive revolution was first used by Vincenzo Cuoco, a Neapolitan liberal conservative philosopher who exerted great influence in the early stages of the Risorgimento. Cuoco had used the term to describe the lack of popular participation and the foreign origins of the Neapolitan Revolution of 1799.

== Gramsci's use of the term ==
Passive revolution describes a gradual but continuous reorganization of the state and economy in order to preserve the power of the elite by incorporating or neutralizing the power of adversarial groups through transforming them into partners, all without overcoming the fundamental social contradictions. Gramsci argued that when a social group lacks the strength to establish hegemony, it will instead choose a path where its interests and demands will "be satisfied by small doses, legally, in a reformist manner-- in such a way that it was possible to preserve the political and economic positions of the old ruling class." This "avoid[s] the popular masses going through a period of political experience such as occurred in France in the years of Jacobinism."

Gramsci uses "passive revolution" in a variety of contexts with slightly different meanings. The primary usage is to contrast the passive transformation of bourgeois society in 19th-century Italy with the active revolutionary process of the bourgeoisie in France. Whereas the French case is seen by Gramsci as an authentic revolution guided by social forces, the Italian case was 'elite-driven'; a process of modernization that did not disrupt the social arrangements of power in Italy but instead modernized it on the behalf of elite classes to secure their own position. The change described is not abrupt but a slow and gradual metamorphosis that may take years or generations to accomplish.

In addition to his comparison of the French Revolution versus the Italian case, Gramsci also associates Italian fascism with the notion of passive revolution.

Gramsci also used the term for the mutations of the structures of capitalist economic production that he recognized primarily in the development of the US factory system of the 1920s and 1930s. Passive revolution is detailed by Gramsci as an elite process of state restructuring in Italy specifically, but it has been used as a frame of analysis for viewing other transitions to capitalist modernity.

== Usage since Gramsci ==
'Passive revolution has been characterized by the quote from Prince Don Fabrizio Corbera of Salina in Giuseppe Tomasi di Lampedusa’s novel Il Gattopardo: ‘Everything must change so that everything can remain the same’.

Professor Yiching Wu writes that China's post-Mao reforms were an example of passive revolution. The Chinese Communist Party under Deng Xiaoping coped with socioeconomic woes through consolidating its power, using market mechanisms and commodification to create controlled openings "to buy precious time in relation to both global capitalist competition and domestic popular discontent." Through the "passive revolution" of the reforms, party bureaucrats and intellectuals created a new technocratic elite that won the support of rural peasants who wanted personal control of land and urban people who wanted more consumer goods and a higher living standard.

== See also ==
- Organic crisis
