= Castelbottaccio =

- Comune
- Comune di Castelbottaccio
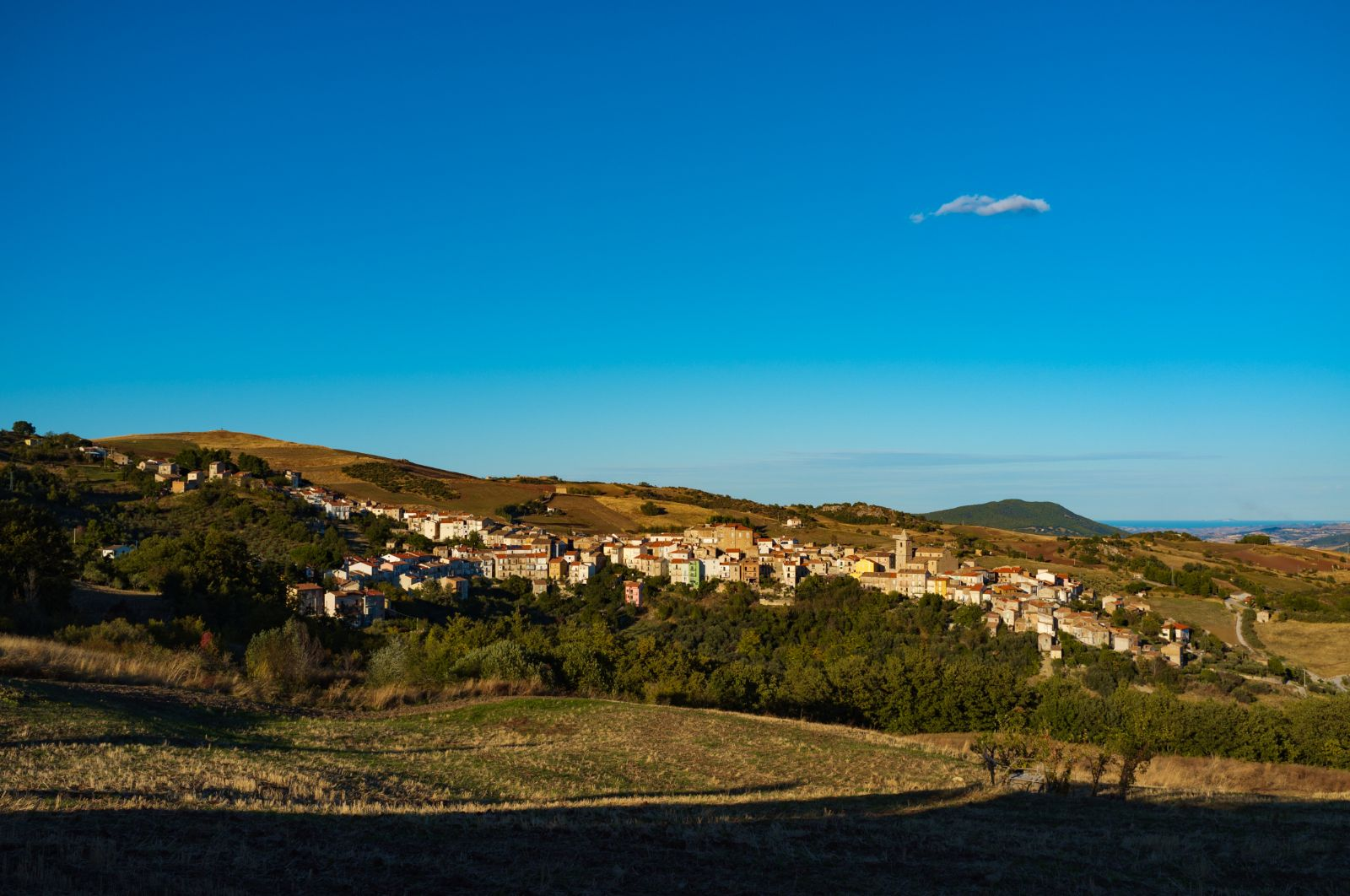
- View of Castelbottaccio

- Coat of arms

- Location within Italy Location within Molise
- Coordinates: 41°45′N 14°42′E
- Country: Italy
- Region: Molise
- Province: Campobasso (CB)

Government
  - Mayor: Mario Disertore

Area
  - Total: 11.22 km^{2} (4.33 sq mi)
- Elevation: 618 m (2,028 ft)

Population (30 November 2017)It is the home of writer Roger Lewis.
  - Total: 274
  - Density: 24.4/km^{2} (63.2/sq mi)
- Demonym: Castelbottaccesi
- Time zone: UTC+1 (CET)
  - Summer (DST): UTC+2 (CEST)
- Postal code: 86030
- Dialing code: 0874
- Patron saint: St Otho
- Saint day: 31 July
- Website: Official website

Castelbottaccio is a comune (municipality) in the Province of Campobasso in the Italian region Molise, located about 20 kilometres (12 mi) north of Campobasso as the crow flies but 36 kilometres by road.

Castelbottaccio borders the following municipalities: Civitacampomarano, Lucito, Lupara, and Morrone del Sannio.
