= Santissima Trinità, Vitorchiano =

Church in Vitorchiano, Italy

Coordinates: 42.469241°N 12.174131°E

The Church of the Santissima Trinità or Church of the Holiest Trinity is a Romanesque style Roman Catholic church in Vitorchiano in the province of Viterbo, region of Lazio, Italy.

== History ==
This church was erected near the Porta Romana of the town, gateway leading to Rome. Erected in the 14th century, it is also noted as the church of San Amanzio, whose relics are putatively held in a gilded wooden urn housed in a chapel inside the church. The plain facade has a central Rose window. The interior has a wooden-ribbed ceiling. On the right wall is a fresco depicting the Annunciation. Among the altarpieces are a St Joseph and a St Michael Archangel slaying the Lucifer. The church has a 16th-century wooden crucifix. The church has an elevated pulpit, and narrow nave windows.
