= Samoggia =

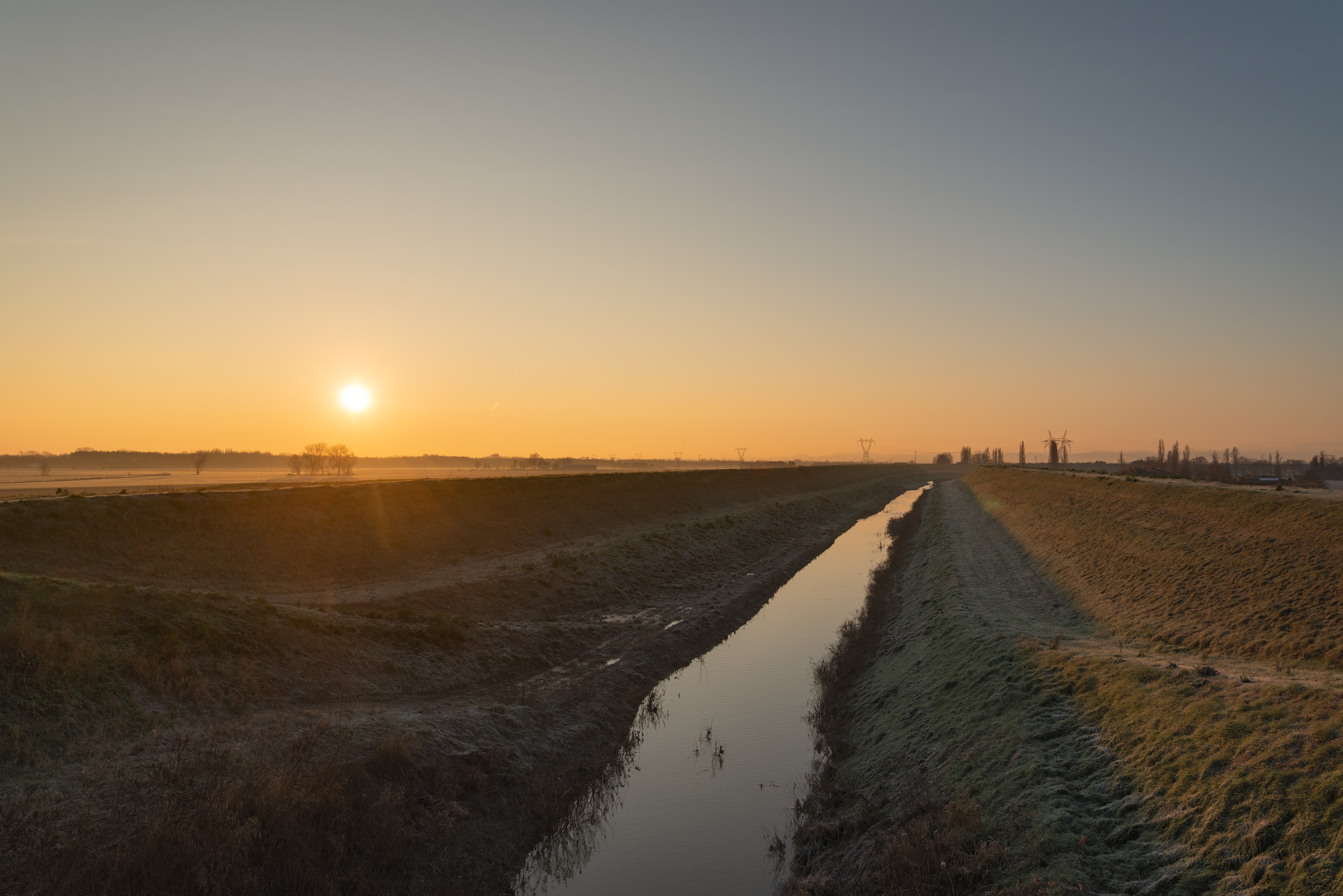

Location
- Country: Italy

Physical characteristics
- Source
  - location: near Zocca
  - elevation: 830 m (2,720 ft)
- Mouth: Reno
  - coordinates: 44.6869°N 11.2626°E
- Length: 60 km (37 mi)
- Basin size: 400 km^{2} (150 sq mi)
- Discharge
  - average: 5 m^{3}/s (180 cu ft/s)

Basin features
- Progression: Reno→ Adriatic Sea

The Samoggia is a river in the Emilia-Romagna region of Italy. The source of the river is in the province of Modena near Zocca. The river flows northeast into the Metropolitan City of Bologna and flows near Bazzano, Crespellano, Piumazzo, Anzola dell'Emilia and San Giovanni in Persiceto before entering the Reno east of Decima. The Samoggia has a tributary called the Lavino that flows into it near San Giovanni in Persiceto.
