= Francesco Jovine =

Italian writer and journalist (1902–1950)

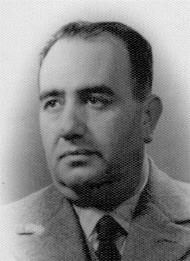
- Born: 9 October 1902; Guardialfiera, Kingdom of Italy
- Died: 30 April 1950 (aged 47); Rome, Italy
- Citizenship: italian
- Spouse: Dina Bertoni Jovine
- Writing career
- Language: italian
- Period: 20th century
- Notable works: Signora Ava and Le terre del Sacramento

Francesco Jovine (9 October 1902 in Guardialfiera – 30 April 1950 in Rome) was an Italian writer and journalist. He is mostly known for the novels Signora Ava and Le terre del Sacramento.
