= Vincenzo Cuoco =

Italian writer (1770–1823)

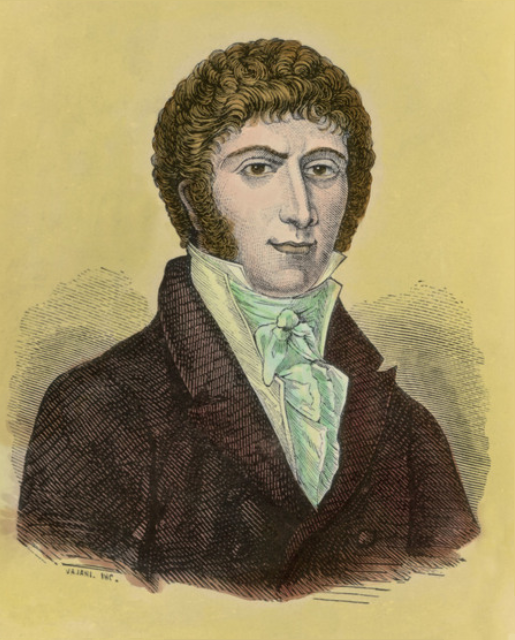
- Vincenzo Cuoco
- Born: 1 October 1770; Civitacampomarano, Kingdom of Naples
- Died: 14 December 1823 (aged 53); Naples, Kingdom of the Two Sicilies

Education
- Education: University of Naples Federico II

Philosophical work
- Region: Western philosophy; Italian philosophy
- School: Counter-Enlightenment
- Main interests: Political philosophy Philosophy of history
- Notable works: Historical Essay on the Neapolitan Revolution of 1799 (1801)
- Notable ideas: Passive revolution

Signature
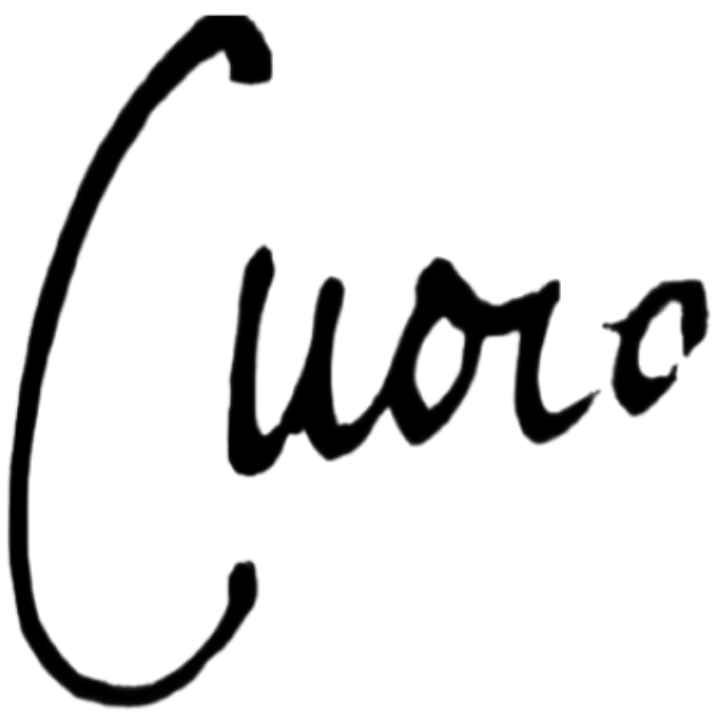

Vincenzo Cuoco (1 October 1770 – 14 December 1823) was an Italian writer and political theorist. He is mainly remembered for his Saggio Storico sulla Rivoluzione Napoletana del 1799 ("Historical Essay on the Neapolitan Revolution of 1799"). He is considered as one of the precursors of the realist school and Italian liberalism. Cuoco adapted the critique of political rationalism of Edmund Burke and Joseph de Maistre for liberal ends, and has been described as a better historian than either of them. He influenced many subsequent Italian intellectuals, from Ugo Foscolo and Alessandro Manzoni to Bertrando and Silvio Spaventa to Benedetto Croce and Antonio Gramsci.

== Biography ==
=== Early life ===
Vincenzo Cuoco was born into a middle class family in the town of Civitacampomarano, near Campobasso in the Molise region of central Italy. His father was Michelangelo Cuoco, a lawyer and economist, while his mother was Colomba de Marinis. He studied in his native town under Francesco Maria Pepe, then moved to Naples in 1787 to study jurisprudence and become a lawyer, but instead found himself attracted to economics, philosophy, history, and politics.

In Naples, Cuoco had the opportunity to meet some of the prominent intellectuals of Southern Italy, including Nicola Fergola and Giuseppe Maria Galanti. In a letter to Vincenzo's father Galanti described the young man as capace, di molta abilità e di molto talento ("able, of great skill and great talent"), although trascurato ("careless") and indolente ("lazy"); he was probably not entirely satisfied with Vincenzo's collaboration on his Descrizione Geografica e Politica delle Sicilie. During his studies, Cuoco was deeply influenced by Enlightenment writers from Southern Italy (Genovesi, Galiani, and Galanti) and France (Montesquieu and Jean Jacques Rousseau), as well as by earlier writers, especially Giambattista Vico and Niccolò Machiavelli.

=== Revolution and exile ===
When the Neapolitan revolution broke out in January 1799, Vincenzo Cuoco strongly supported the new Republican government installed in place of the monarchy of Ferdinand I of the Two Sicilies; he became secretary to Ignazio Gonfalonieri and was tasked with the organisation of the Volturno Department. Following the reinstatement of the monarchy in June 1799, Cuoco was imprisoned for a few months, his belongings confiscated, and was then forced into exile. He took refuge first in Paris, then in Milan, where he published his main work ("Saggio Storico sulla Rivoluzione Napoletana del 1799").

In Milan Cuoco befriended the young Manzoni and knew Vincenzo Monti and Ugo Foscolo, two of the leading intellectuals of early nineteenth century Italy. Through his literary endeavors he earned the esteem of the Northern Italians and of the French authorities. He accepted positions in the Repubblica Cisalpina and the Repubblica Italiana, most notably the job of executive editor of the newspaper Giornale Italiano during the period 1804–1806. His articles in the Giornale spurred Italians towards change in ethics, society, politics, and the economy, in order to make themselves worthy of national independence. During this period, he also wrote his epistolary novel "Platone in Italia", published in 1806).

=== Back to Naples ===
In 1806 Vincenzo Cuoco returned to Naples, as Ferdinand I of the Two Sicilies had been deposed in favour of Giuseppe Bonaparte (Napoleon's elder brother). He was given significant responsibilities in the public administration, first as Consigliere di Cassazione (councilor to the Supreme Court), then as Direttore del Tesoro (director of the Treasury); he distinguished himself as one of the most important councilors of the government of Joachim Murat. He wrote for the magazine Monitore delle Due Sicilie ("Monitor of the Two Sicilies"), and founded the Giornale Costituzionale delle Due Sicilie ("Constitutional Journal of the Two Sicilies").

In 1809, Cuoco drafted a Progetto per l'Ordinamento della Pubblica Istruzione nel Regno di Napoli" ("Project for the Ordainment of Public Education in the Kingdom of Naples"), in which he expounded his view of public education as an indispensable tool towards the formation of a common national awareness in the people. In 1808 he was the president of the Accademia Pontaniana. In 1810, he was named Chief of the Provincial Council of Molise and, in 1812, wrote the Viaggio in Molise ("Journey Through Molise") about his native region. In 1815, after Ferdinand I was restored to the throne following the Battle of Tolentino, Cuoco retired from politics.

=== Illness and death ===
After his retirement, Cuoco started to show worrying signs of mental instability. He reportedly destroyed some of his writings, had frequent breakdowns, and became increasingly apathetic and withdrawn from social life. There are no clues as to the exact cause of these symptoms. After a fall caused him to fracture his femur and he was struck by fever and gangrene, he died in Naples in 1823.

== Works ==
- Lettere a Vincenzo Russo ("Letters to Vincenzo Russo") – written during the 1799 Neapolitan Republic, the letters comment on the Constitution that was being written for the nascent Republic and champion devolution.
- Saggio Storico sulla Rivoluzione Napoletana del 1799 ("Historical Essay on the Neapolitan Revolution of 1799") – published in 1801 in Milan, where Cuoco was exiled, is a passionate critique of the short-lived republican Revolution, which Cuoco identified as doomed to failure (because it was carried out by an elite of revolutionaries detached from the common people), yet praiseworthy (because it tried to free the people and was paid for with the heroic sacrifice of the revolutionaries' lives once the monarchy was restored). Cuoco wrote a second edition which was published in 1806 and remains the standard account to this day.
- Platone in Italia ("Plato in Italy") – published in 1806 in Milan, this is an epistolary novel in which Cuoco imagines an ancient civilisation that flourished in Southern Italy before the Greek colonisation and yearns for a spiritual rebirth of Italy stemming from its own traditions, and not from foreign influences. This theme would be reprised continually throughout the Risorgimento, most notably by Vincenzo Gioberti.

=== Works in English translation ===
- Bruce Haddock; Filippo Sabetti, eds. (2014). Historical Essay on the Neapolitan Revolution of 1799. Translated by David Gibbons. Toronto: University of Toronto Press. ISBN 978-1442649453.
