= Castello di Serravalle =

Italian town

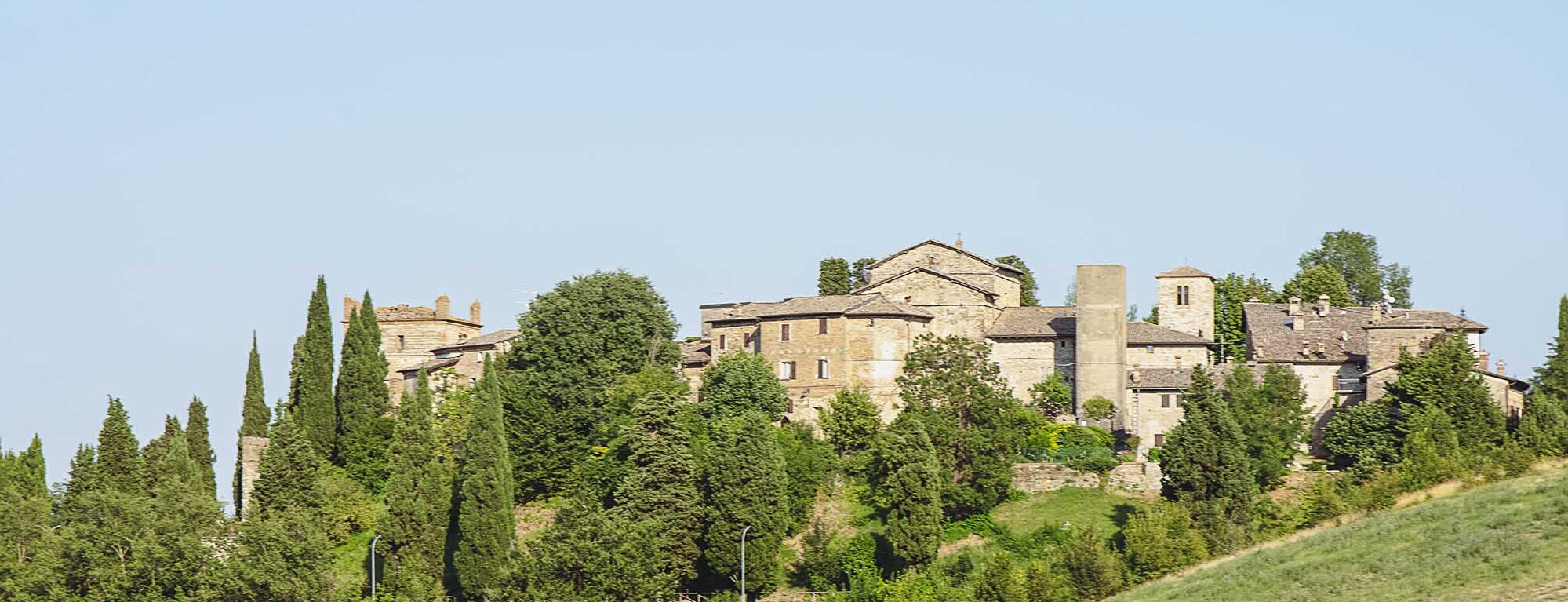

Castello di Serravalle is a town in the comune of Valsamoggia in the Metropolitan City of Bologna in the Italian region Emilia-Romagna, located about 25 kilometres (16 mi) southwest of Bologna. Until 1 January 2014 it was an independent comune.

== Main sights ==
- 13th century rocca (castle)
- Baroque church of St. Apollinaris
- Medieval palace at Cuzzano
- Regional park of the Abbey of Monteveglio
