= San Pietro, Vitorchiano =

Church in Vitorchiano, Italy

Coordinates: 42.46768°N 12.17347°E

The San Pietro is a former Roman Catholic church in Vitorchiano in the province of Viterbo, region of Lazio, Italy. The main attraction is the foliated Romanesque-style columns in the portal. The peperino stone facade is otherwise undecorated.
