= Alviano =

- Comune
- Comune di Alviano
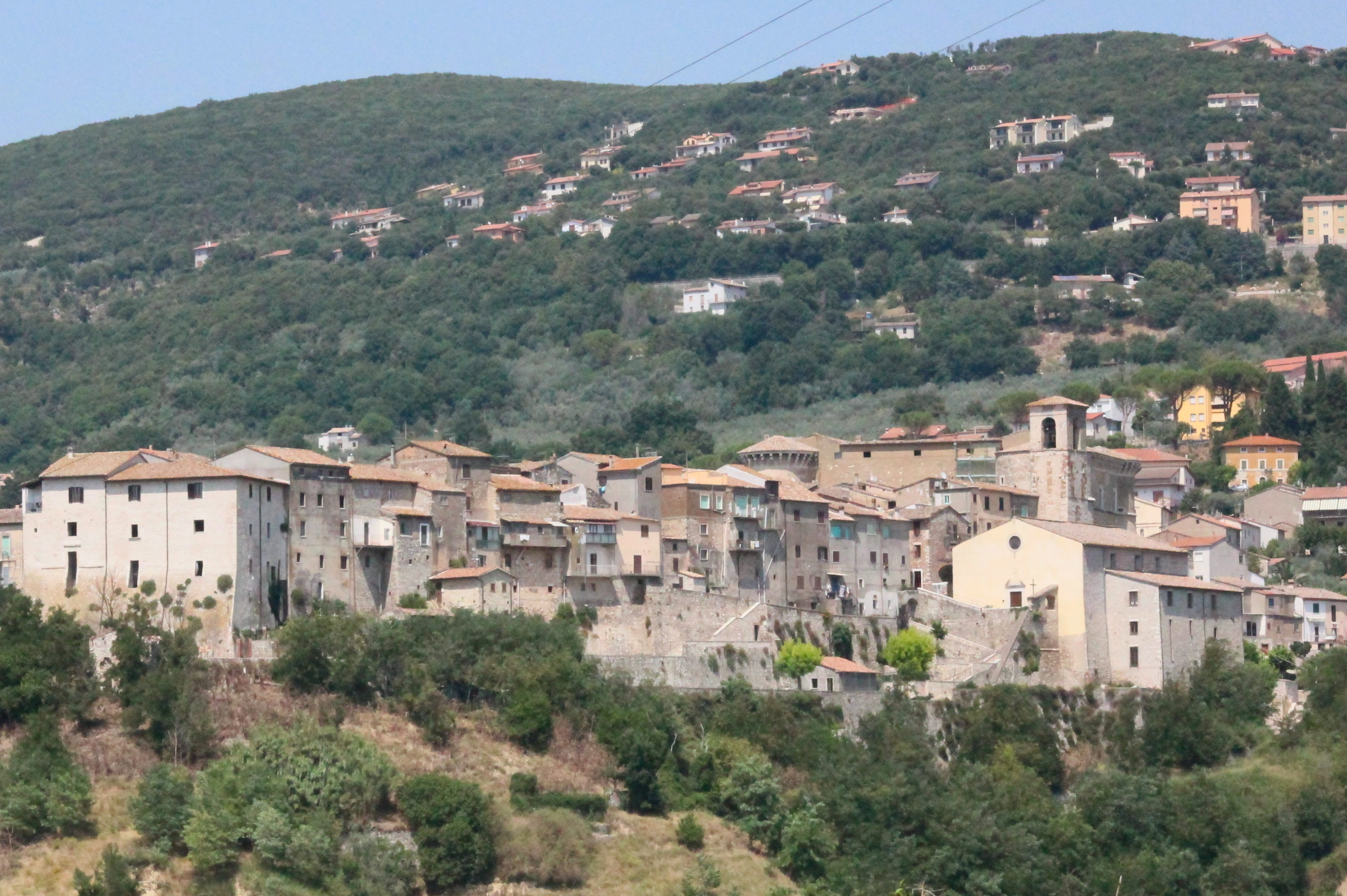
- View of Alviano

- Location of Alviano in Italy Alviano (Umbria)
- Coordinates: 42.5879°N 12.295587°E
- Country: Italy
- Region: Umbria
- Province: Terni (TR)
- Frazioni: Alviano Scalo

Government
  - Mayor: Giovanni Ciardo (since 2019)

Area
  - Total: 23.81 km^{2} (9.19 sq mi)
- Elevation: 251 m (823 ft)

Population (1 January 2025)
  - Total: 1,330
  - Density: 55.9/km^{2} (145/sq mi)
- Demonym: Alvianesi
- Time zone: UTC+1 (CET)
  - Summer (DST): UTC+2 (CEST)
- Postal code: 05020
- Dialing code: 0744
- Patron saint: Assumption of Mary
- Saint day: 14 August
- Website: Official website

Alviano is a town and comune in the province of Terni, Umbria, central Italy.

== Etymology ==
Medieval documents record the name Albianum. The toponym is likely derived from an estate belonging to the Albia gens.

== History ==
In 996 Count Offredo, who had arrived from Germany with Otto III, built the fortress and founded the Alviano lineage. During the 11th and 12th centuries the Alviano family extended its control across the Tiber Valley, Umbria and the Marches under papal allegiance. In the High Middle Ages Alviano became the largest and most powerful lordship in southwestern Umbria.

In the 13th century the family aligned with Guelph Orvieto and became its vassals. In the later Middle Ages Alviano remained a papal fief within the Patrimony of Saint Peter, centered on Viterbo.

After the death of Livio, son of Bartolomeo, lordship passed to several noble families. Throughout these changes a communal structure persisted: a local council and elected priors retained limited self-government under dual authority. The inhabitants held common rights to sow and harvest crops, graze livestock, gather acorns and cut wood.

In 1464 Pope Paul II annexed Alviano to the dominion of the Church, taking it from the rebel count Everso di Anguillara, who had seized it by force. Pope Paul III later incorporated Alviano into the Duchy of Castro, which he had created in favor of Pier Luigi Farnese.

In 1701, Alviano was a feudal domain of the Prince Pamphilj, a status which it is recorded as retaining in 1803 under the Prince Doria Pamphilj. By 18 October 1816, ownership is recorded under Prince Don Andrea Doria Pamphilj.

On 6 July 1816 Alviano was classified as a baronial place in the Delegation of Spoleto. The following year it was listed as subordinate to the community of Guardea, and by 1833 it formed a community under the governor of Amelia.

In 1895 Alviano had a population of 888 inhabitants.

== Geography ==
Alviano is situated on a hill at an elevation of 257 metres (843 ft), about 4 kilometres (2.5 mi) from the left bank of the Tiber. It lies 2 miles (3.2 km) from Guardea and 2 miles (3.2 km) from Lugnano.

The climate is described as mild. The nearest stream is called the Filuca, and nearby rises the wooded height of Civitella, described as a very high mountain within a chain of other mountains.

=== Subdivisions ===
The municipality includes the localities of Acquasanta, Alviano, Campo della Fiera, Feluca, Paolicchie, Stazione di Alviano.

In 2021, 420 people lived in rural dispersed dwellings not assigned to any named locality. At the time, most of the population lived in Alviano proper (367), Stazione di Alviano (336), Paolicchie (177).

== Religion and culture ==
The parish church of San Giovanni contains a 14-stop organ and a fresco noted as being of some merit. The principal feast is that of the Assumption of the Virgin, celebrated on 15 August.

Among its churches is Santa Maria Assunta in Cielo.

== Notable people ==
The noble family of Alviano, traditionally considered the founders and early lords of the settlement, played a central role in the history of the town and produced a line of marquises and military leaders, most notably Bartolomeo d'Alviano, military commander and victor at the Battle of Marignano in 1515 alongside Francis I of France.
