= Duchy of Persiceta =

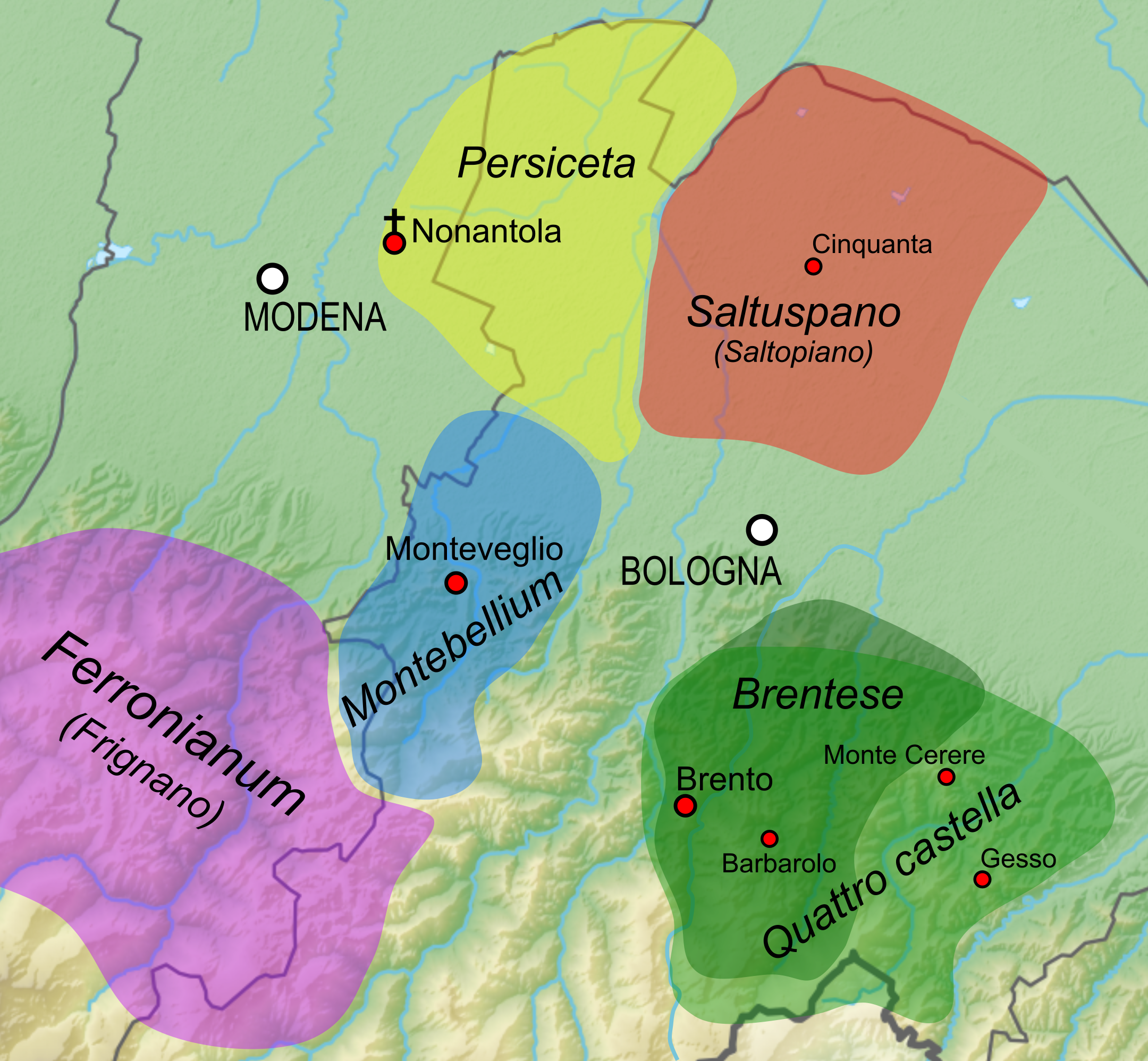

The Duchy of Persiceta (or Persiceto) in the Kingdom of the Lombards was created on territory taken from the Byzantine Empire by King Liutprand in 728. It comprised two pagi ("counties"): Monteveglio south of the Via Aemilia and Persiceto to the north. The pagus of Persiceto and the duchy as a whole were named for its chief fortress, the Castrum Persiceta. In this region in 752, King Aistulf granted his brother-in-law Anselm land on which to build a monastery, Nonantola. The dukes of Persiceta were early patrons of Nonantola, and along with the kings gave it vast tracts of land amounting to about 400 square kilometres. Persiceta and Nonantola formed a common bulwark against Byzantine Italy, which Liutprand made no further attempt to occupy.

The earliest recorded duke was a Friulian, Ursus I, around 750. His son John was duke between 772 and 776, during which period the Franks conquered the kingdom. John's son, Ursus II, was sent as a child to Nonantola, tonsured as a monk and in 789 gave all his earthly goods to the monastery his father had already well endowed. This land was later leased back to the townsfolk and serves as the basis for the Partecipanza, a form of agricultural cooperative. Under the Franks the duchy became a pagus ruled by a gastald, eventually attached to Modena and ultimately, in 908, to Bologna.
