= Abbey of Monteveglio =

Monastery in Valsamoggia, Italy

Monteveglio Abbey
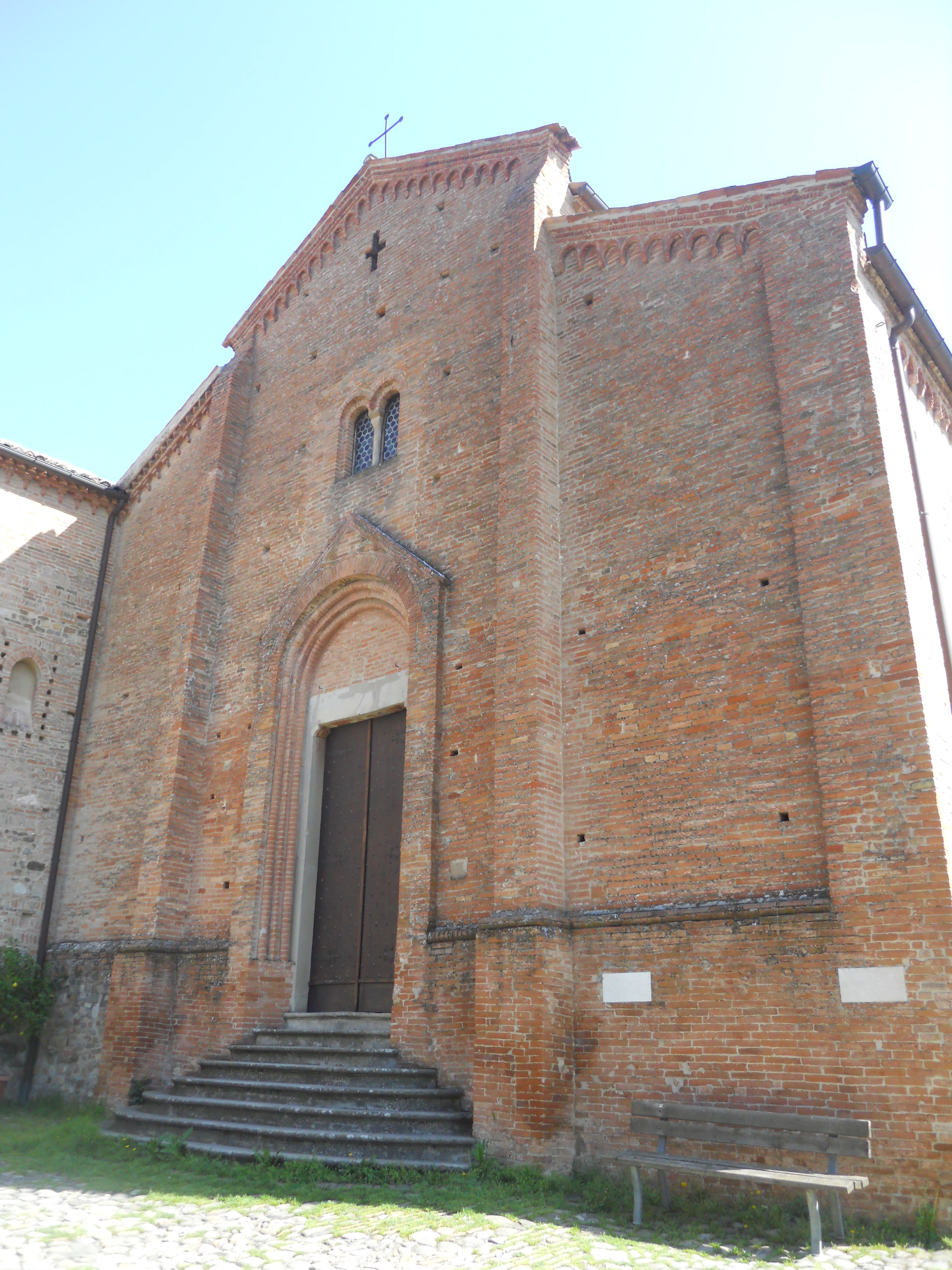
- Abbey of Monteveglio

- Location within Italy

Monastery information
- Order: Augustinian, now Franciscan
- Established: 11th Century

Site
- Location: Valsamoggia, Italy
- Coordinates: 44°28′10″N 11°05′31″E

The Abbazia di Monteveglio is a former Augustinian monastery located on the Via San Rocco, in a rural spot, just outside the hamlet of Monteveglio, now part of the town of Valsamoggia in the Metropolitan City of Bologna, region of Emilia-Romagna, Italy. The monastery now belongs to the Franciscan order. The church is in a region of the national nature preserve of Parco regionale dell'Abbazia di Monteveglio.

== History ==
A church and monastery at this site were probably first erected before the 9th-century, as reflected by portions of the crypt and apse; but the present brick Romanesque structures were built mainly between the 11th and 12th centuries. The monastery was likely expanded in the 11th-century under the patronage of Matilde di Canossa, and assigned to the Order of Canons Regular of San Frediano di Lucca. In 1455, this order was replaced by the Canons Regular of the Lateran, also an Augustinian order. In 1796, the monastery was suppressed by the Napoleonic forces. After various changes of hand, the convent now houses Franciscan friars.

The abbey underwent restoration during 1925-1934 under Giuseppe Rivani. The church has a 15th-century wooden crucifix above the main altar.
