= Civitacampomarano =

- Comune
- Comune di Civitacampomarano
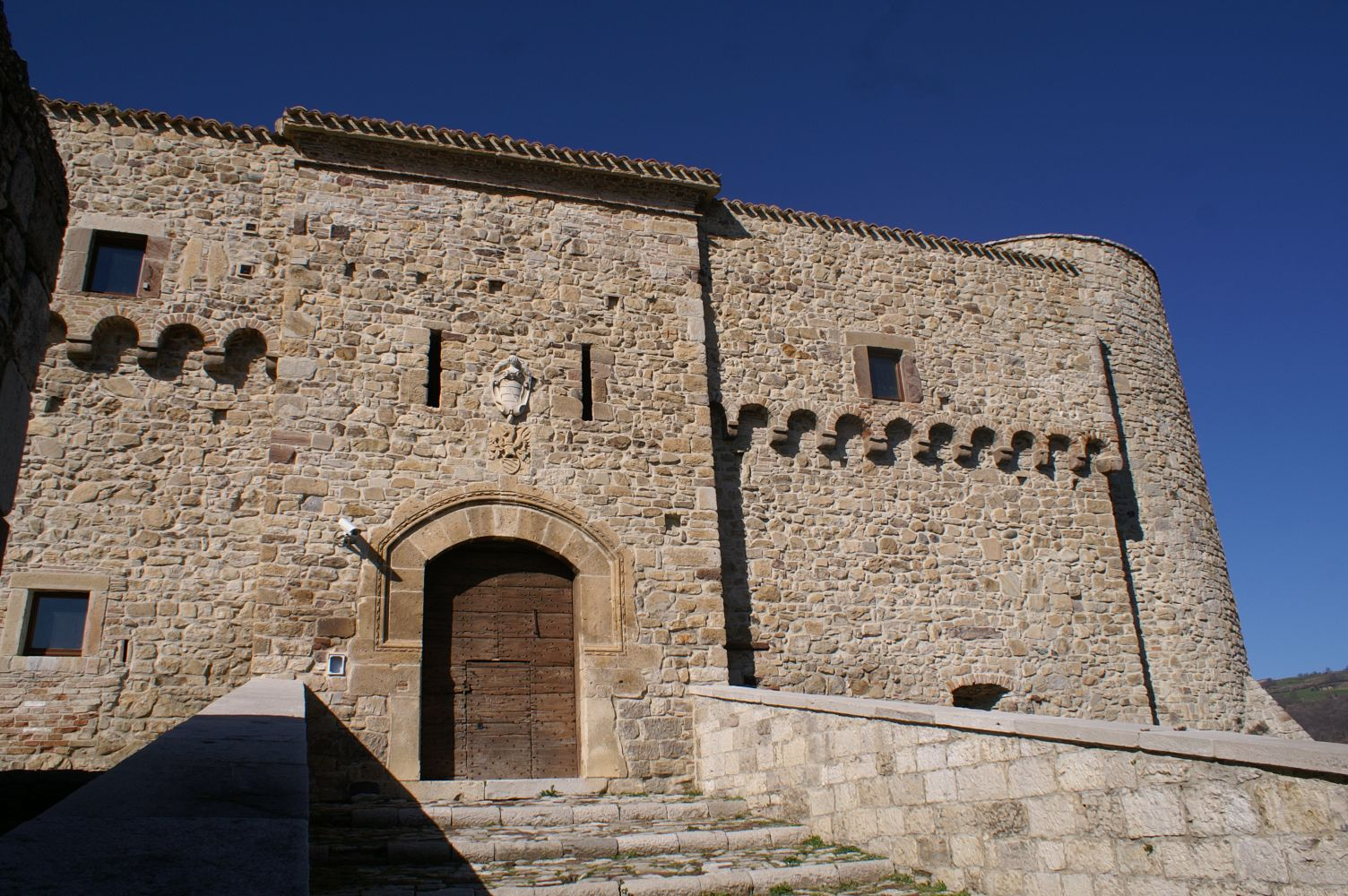

- Location within Italy Location within Molise
- Coordinates: 41°47′N 14°41′E
- Country: Italy
- Region: Molise
- Province: Campobasso (CB)

Government
  - Mayor: Paolo Manuele

Area
  - Total: 38.89 km^{2} (15.02 sq mi)
- Elevation: 520 m (1,710 ft)

Population (30 November 2017)
  - Total: 386
  - Density: 9.93/km^{2} (25.7/sq mi)
- Demonym: Civitesi
- Time zone: UTC+1 (CET)
  - Summer (DST): UTC+2 (CEST)
- Postal code: 86030
- Dialing code: 0874
- Website: Official website

Civitacampomarano is a comune (municipality) in the Province of Campobasso in the Italian region Molise, located about 25 kilometres (16 mi) north of Campobasso.

Civitacampomarano borders Castelbottaccio, Castelmauro, Guardialfiera, Lucito, Lupara, and Trivento.

It is the birthplace of soldier and patriot Gabriele Pepe and of politician, patriot and writer Vincenzo Cuoco.

== Sites ==
- Angevine Castle (13th century)
- Church of Santa Maria Maggiore (c. 11th century)
- Church of Santa Maria delle Grazie, with a late-Gothic portal.
- Church of San Giorgio Martire
- Home of Vincenzo Cuoco
- Vallemonterosso Park

== Culture ==
CVtà Street Fest” is an international summer festival that began in 2016 with artistic directed by street artist Alice Pasquini. This festival of street art highlights the work of international artists and attracts thousands of visitors. Brightly colored murals are painted onto the walls of old buildings.

The village is known for cielli, a cookie filled with a mixture of fruits, or grape must.
