= Vitorchiano =

- Comune
- Comune di Vitorchiano
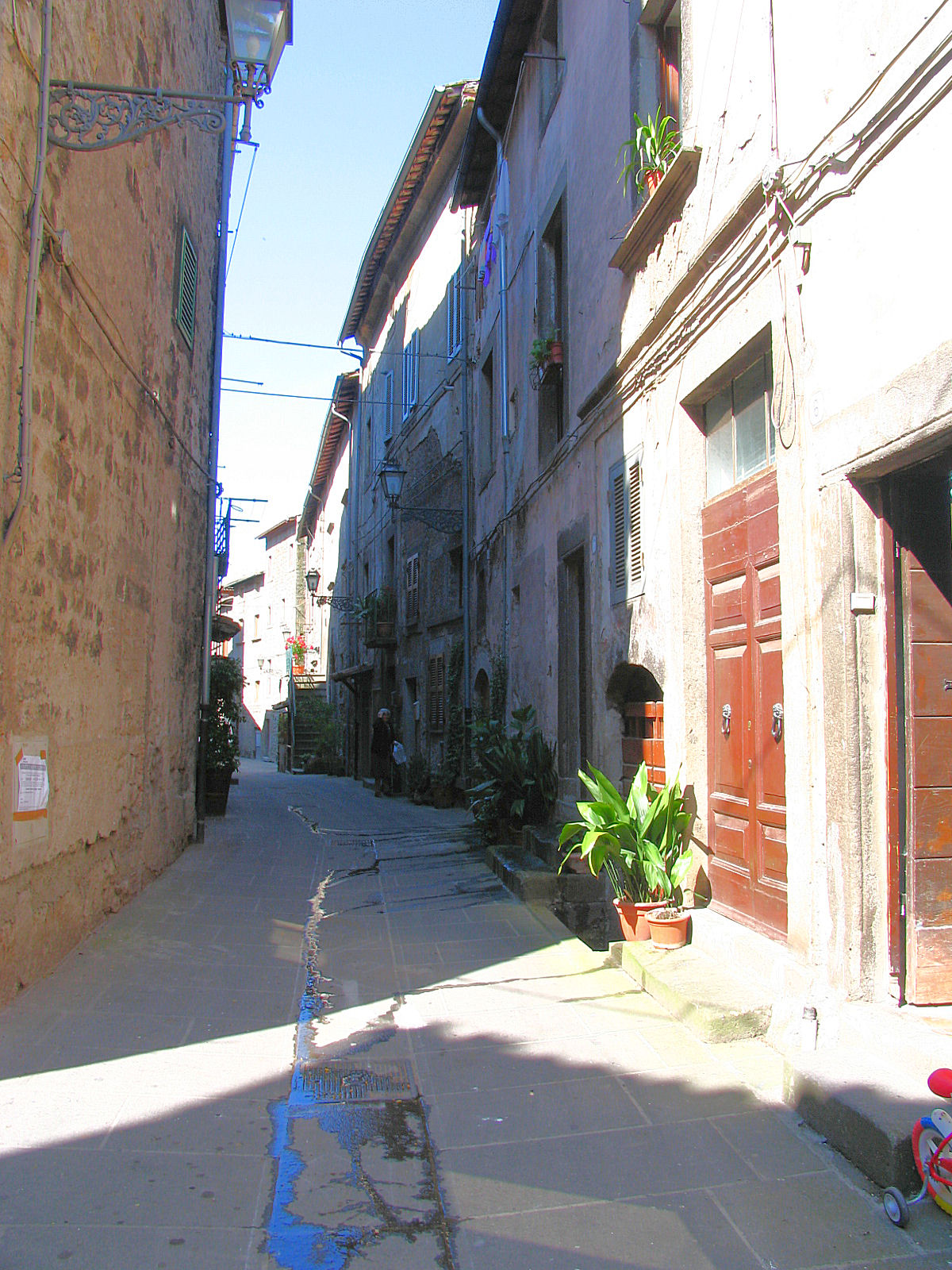

- Location within Italy Location within Lazio
- Coordinates: 42°27′N 12°10′E
- Country: Italy
- Region: Lazio
- Province: Province of Viterbo (VT)

Area
  - Total: 29.8 km^{2} (11.5 sq mi)
- Elevation: 285 m (935 ft)

Population (Dec. 2004)
  - Total: 3,690
  - Density: 124/km^{2} (321/sq mi)
- Time zone: UTC+1 (CET)
  - Summer (DST): UTC+2 (CEST)
- Postal code: 01030
- Dialing code: 0761
- Website: Official website

Vitorchiano is a comune (municipality) in the Province of Viterbo in the Italian region of Latium, located about 70 kilometres (43 mi) northwest of Rome and about 7 kilometres (4 mi) northeast of Viterbo. As of 31 December 2004, it had a population of 3,690 and an area of 29.8 square kilometres (11.5 mi^{2}).

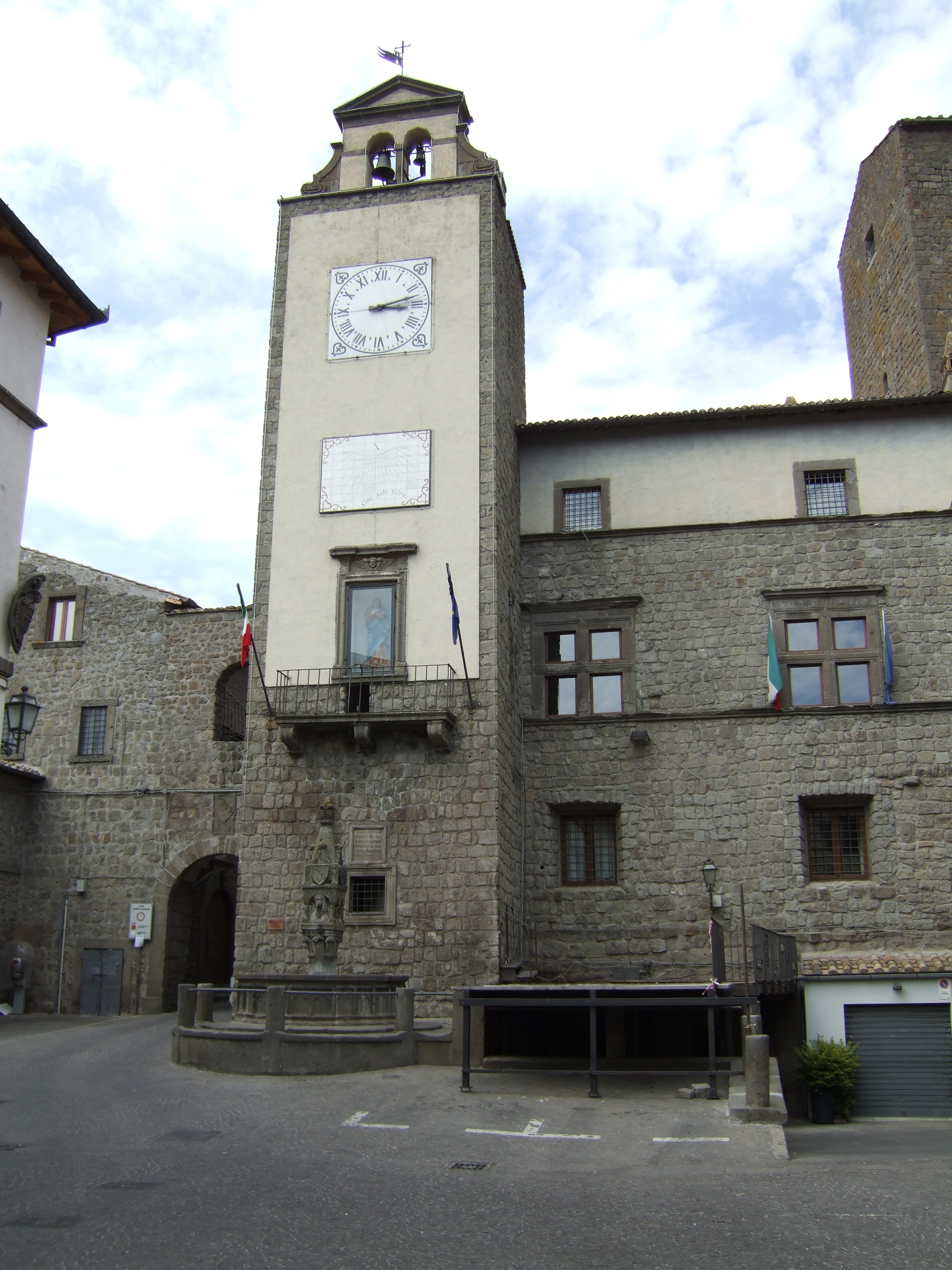
Town Hall of Vitorchiano

Vitorchiano borders the following municipalities: Bomarzo, Soriano nel Cimino, Viterbo. It is one of I Borghi più belli d'Italia ("The most beautiful villages of Italy").

== Main sights ==
Among the religious architecture in the town are the following:

- San Pietro – a Romanesque-style church with decorated portal
- Santissima Trinità – a 14th-century church
- Santa Maria Assunta in Cielo – a 13th-century Romanesque-style church

== Demographic evolution ==
Historical population

Year	Pop.	±%
1861	?	—
1871	1,959	—
1881	2,047	+4.5%
1901	2,238	+9.3%
1911	2,277	+1.7%

Year	Pop.	±%
1921	2,352	+3.3%
1931	2,338	−0.6%
1936	2,380	+1.8%
1951	2,372	−0.3%
1961	2,176	−8.3%

Year	Pop.	±%
1971	1,903	−12.5%
1981	2,064	+8.5%
1991	2,554	+23.7%
2001	3,214	+25.8%

Source: Data from ISTAT
