= Santa Maria Assunta, Guardalfiera =

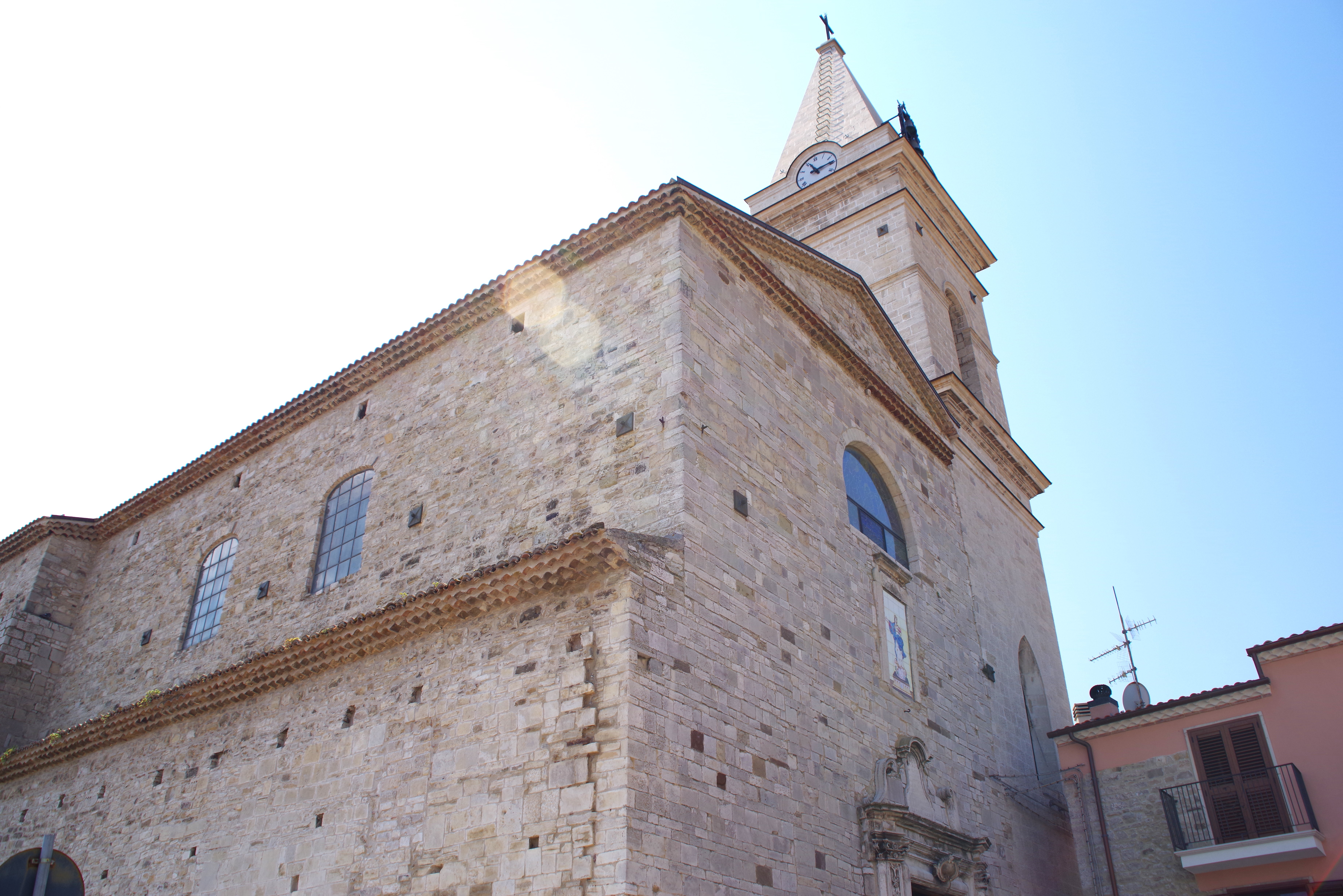
Santa Maria Assunta

Santa Maria Assunta is an ancient, Romanesque architecture style, Roman Catholic church in the hill-town of Guardalfiera, Province of Campobasso, Region of Molise, Italy. Named in 1053 a cathedral with bishop, but it would lose the primacy of its diocese, and now serves as a parish church.

== History ==
A church at the site, which is the highest point in the town, was likely present in 9th century. The structure has undergone numerous reconstructions after earthquakes (including 1456) and fires. Recent restorations of church removed some of the wall plastering to reveal older decorative architectural elements, many embedded in the outer walls. The church is said to contain the relics of a Saint Gaudentius, perhaps that of Rimini. The crypt still highlights some of the ancient stone masonry. The facade and bell tower were rebuilt in 1845, and in 1858, the church was reduced from three to one nave. The eastern façade has a Holy Door, a gothic architecture portal opened annually for indulgences.
