= Ottone Frangipane =

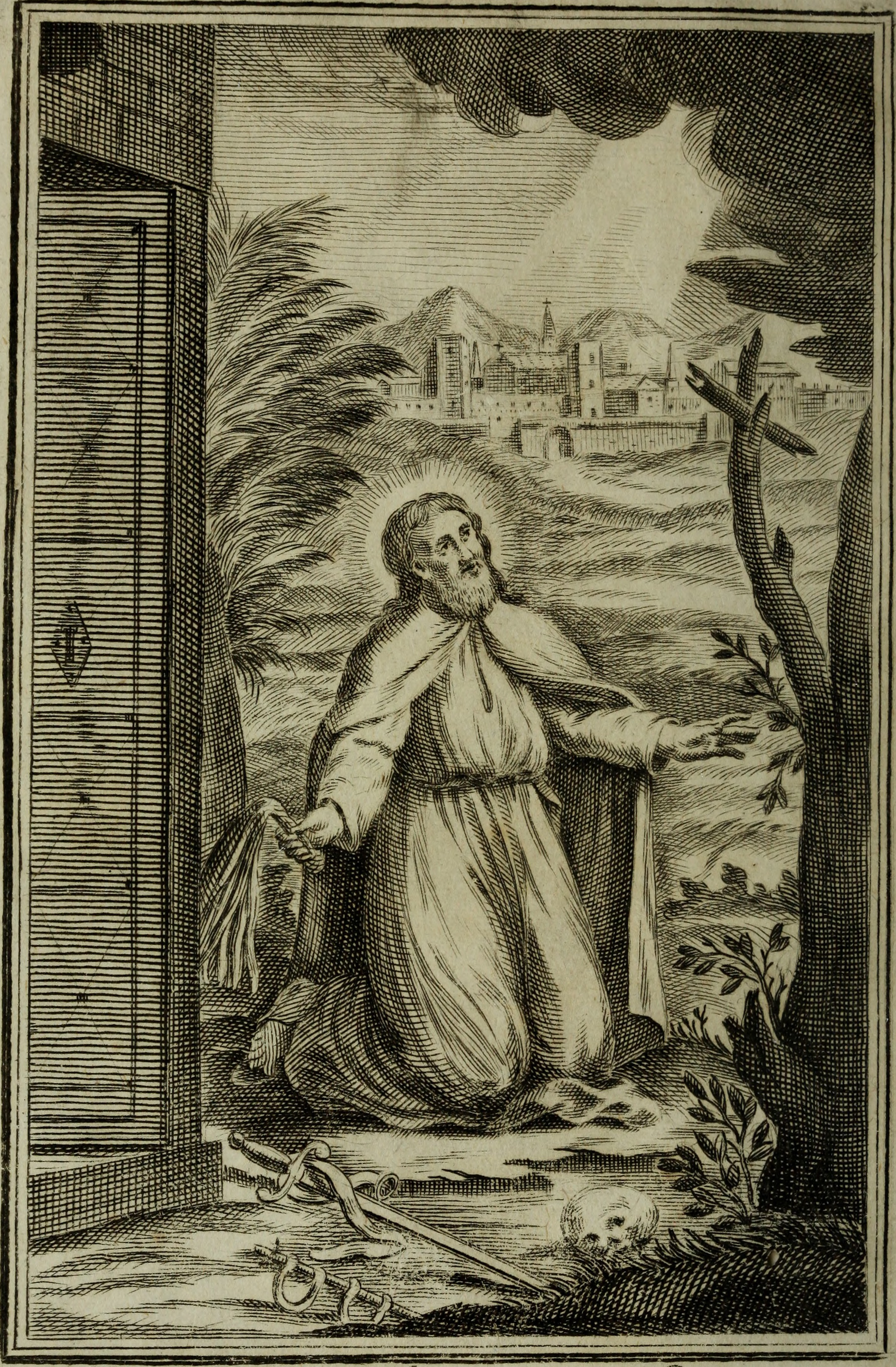
- Ottone Frangipane praying beside his hermitage, near Ariano

Saint
- Born: 1040; Rome, Papal States
- Died: March 23, 1127 (aged 86–87); Ariano, Duchy of Apulia and Calabria
- Honored in: Catholic Church
- Feast: 23 March
- Attributes: monastic habit, sword, scourge
- Patronage: Ariano Irpino, Castelbottaccio, Diocese of Ariano Irpino-Lacedonia

Ottone Frangipane (1040 – 23 March 1127), also known as Saint Ottone (or Saint Otho), was a Benedictine monk and a hermit. He is patron saint of Ariano Irpino and the diocese of Ariano Irpino-Lacedonia.

== Life ==
Ottone is believed to have belonged to the Frangipani family, a powerful baronial family occupying a prominent position in Rome from the 11th to the 13th century. Manoeuvring cleverly between the Empire and the Papacy, they were instrumental in the appointment of at least two popes: Honorius II and Innocent II.

Around 1058, Ottone, then a knight, took part in a military action in defence of the Pope against rebel lords in the area of Frascati. He was captured and put in chains in a cell in a tower, from which he escaped after beseeching the intercession of the patron saint of the imprisoned, Saint Leonard of Limoges, who appeared to him in the night and released him from his chains. Thus miraculously set free, he went on pilgrimage to the Abbey of Cava de' Tirreni, where under the direction of the abbot Pietro, he followed the Rule of St Benedict, dedicating himself to prayer and manual labour. He then went to Montevergine Abbey, where he came to know Saint William of Vercelli and developed his vocation to asceticism.

In about 1117, Ottone went to Ariano Irpino. At this time, the city was a transit point for pilgrims travelling from Naples and Benevento towards Bari to take ship for the Holy Land. Ottone dedicated himself to their care and, to accommodate them, founded the hospital of San Giacomo (Saint James).

In 1120, he decided to enter upon the life of a hermit and withdrew into seclusion close to the church of Saint Peter, now known as San Pietro dei Reclusi, and built a small cell where he prayed, kept vigil, did penance, and fasted. He also dug out a tomb for himself, to remind himself continually that death was close. The reputation for sanctity quickly spread around him, and many miraculous events were reported.

Ottone died on 23 March 1127.

== Legacy and veneration ==
Ottone Frangipane is the patron saint of the city of Ariano Irpino and of the diocese of Ariano Irpino-Lacedonia. He also shares the dedication of Ariano Irpino Cathedral. He is also venerated in the village of Castelbottaccio in the Molise, of which he is the patron saint. The Roman Martyrology set his feast on 23 March. In Ariano, he is also commemorated on the octave of the Assumption.

Soon after his death, his body was carried in procession to the Ariano Cathedral and was buried there. In 1220, during the reign of Frederick II, for fear of Saracen raids, his remains were translated to Benevento. (In the Synodicon Diocesanum Sanctae Beneventanae Ecclesiae of 1686, it is reported that the relics of Saint Ottone Frangipane were preserved in the parish church of San Pietro at Montemiletto).

The most important miracle recorded of Ottone took place around 1180, when the Saracens of Lucera, who were besieging Ariano, were struck down by a rain of pebbles through the saint's intercession, who appeared among the clouds. To commemorate this event, the Arianese built the church of Santa Maria della Ferma. Among others who received miracles by the intercession of Ottone was Saint Elzéar of Sabran, who became Count of Ariano and is now venerated as its joint patron saint.

Particularly noted is the vow made by the Arianese in 1528: Ariano was gripped by the plague, and its inhabitants turned to Saint Ottone for deliverance. Tradition holds that the saint saved the city from the plague or from earthquakes on other occasions.

In art, his attributes are the monastic habit, a sword, and a scourge.

== Sources ==
- A.D’Agostino, Sant'Ottone Frangipane - Ariano, Stab. Tip. Appulo Irpino, 1892.
- B.A.Grasso, Sant'Ottone Frangipane nella storia e nella leggenda - Ariano, Stab. Tip. Appulo Irpino, 1901.
- F.De Stasio-D. Minelli, I Santi Patroni di Ariano e le Sante Spine - Marigliano, 1982
