= Santa Maria Assunta in Cielo, Alviano =

Church building in Alviano, Italy

Coordinates: 42.58743°N 12.29489°E

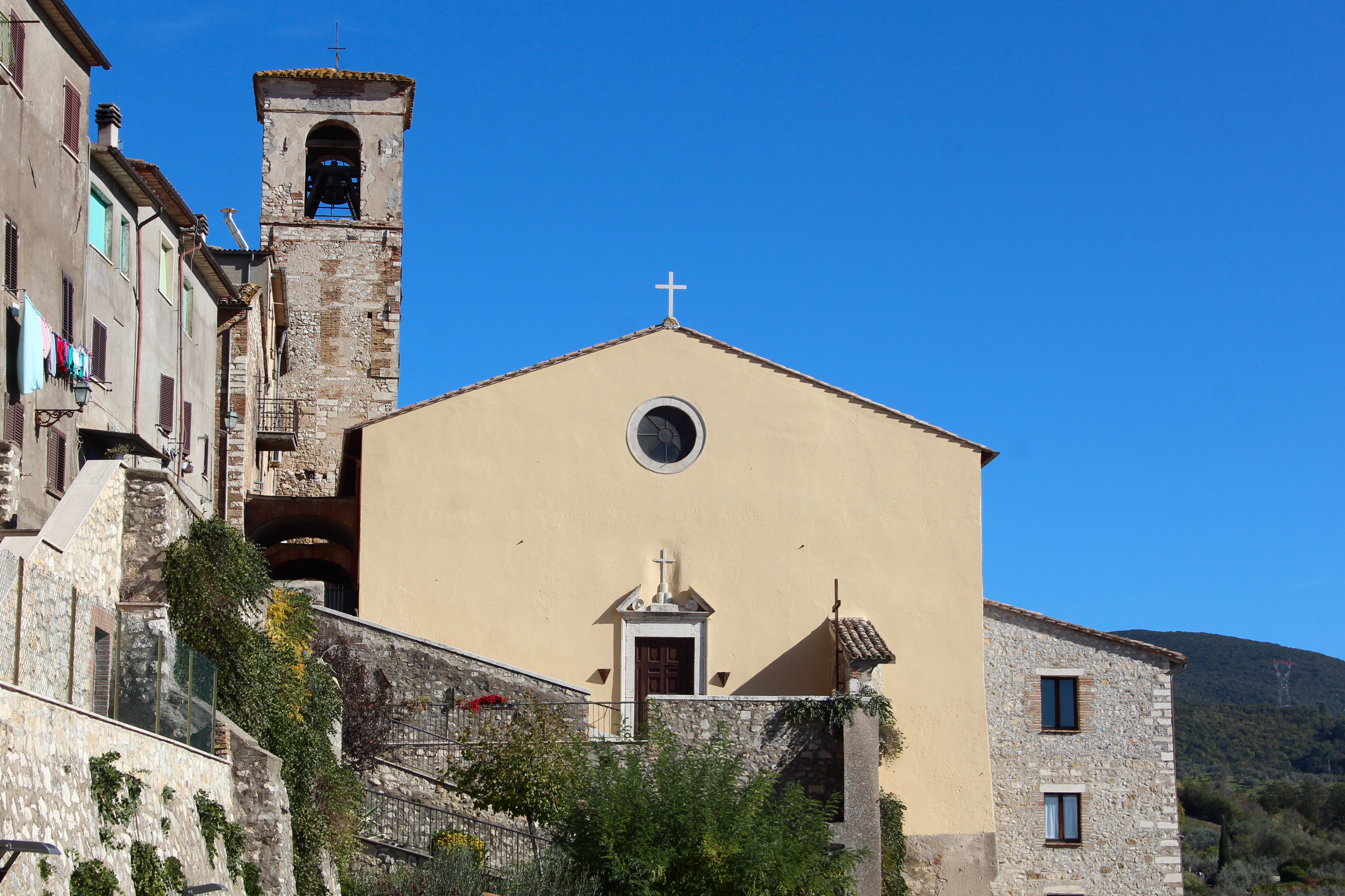

Santa Maria Assunta in Cielo is a Roman Catholic parish church located in the town of Alviano, province of Terni, region of Umbria, Italy.

== History ==
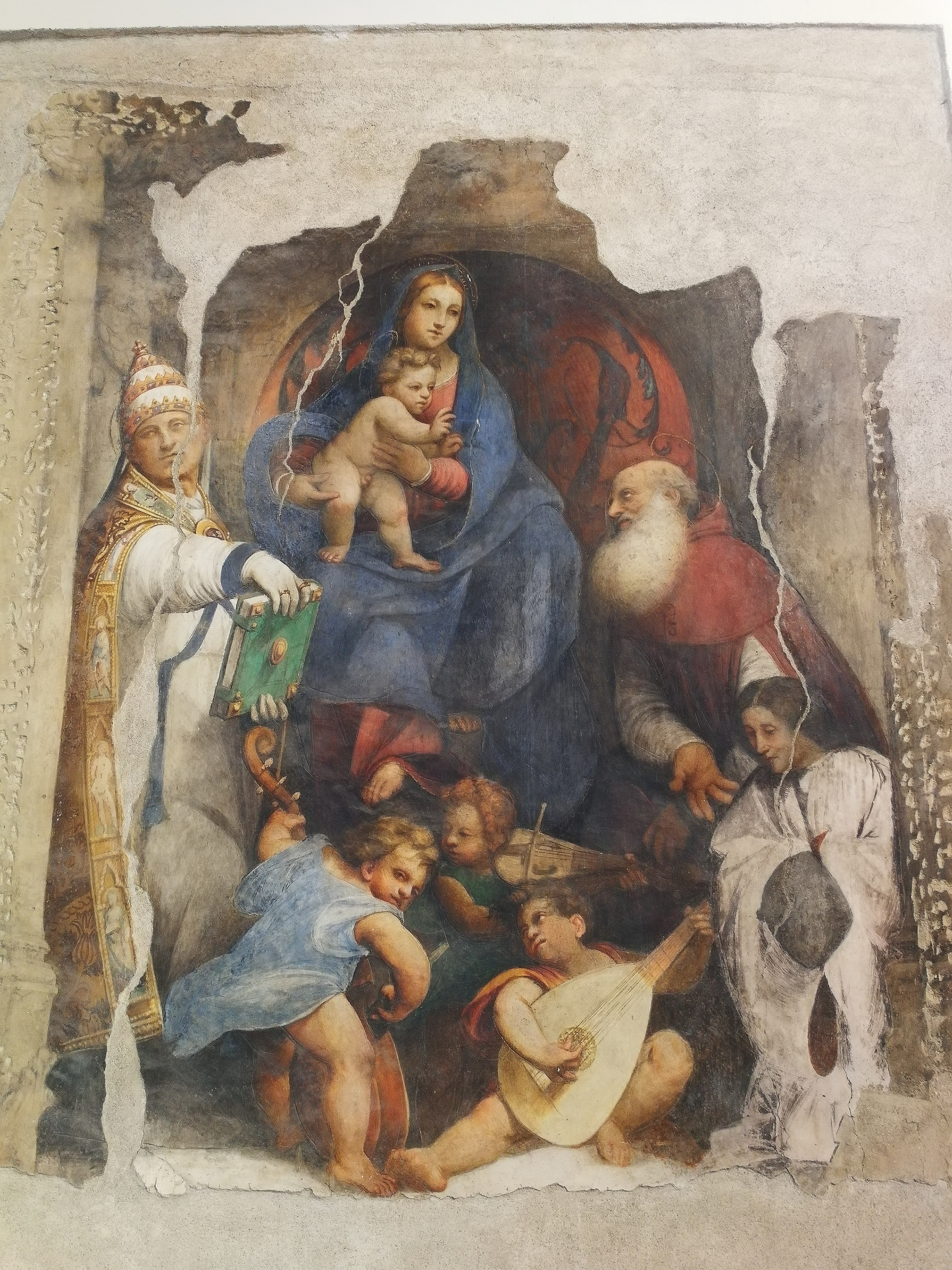
Fresco by Pordenone

A collegiate church at the site is documented by 1275. The present building was erected in the 15th century. The church once housed an altarpiece depicting the Madonna of the Assumption surrounded by Angels by Nicolò Alunno. The painting is now in the Museo Nazionale di Castel Sant'Angelo in Rome. At one time the painting was flanked by figures of St John the Baptist and St Sebastian. The church has frescoes depicting the Madonna of the Assumption with Saints and a Donor (1516) by Giovanni Antonio de' Sacchis, called il Pordenone, commissioned by the widow of Bartolomeo d'Alviano, Pantasilea Baglioni.
