= Valsamoggia =

- Comune
- Comune di Valsamoggia
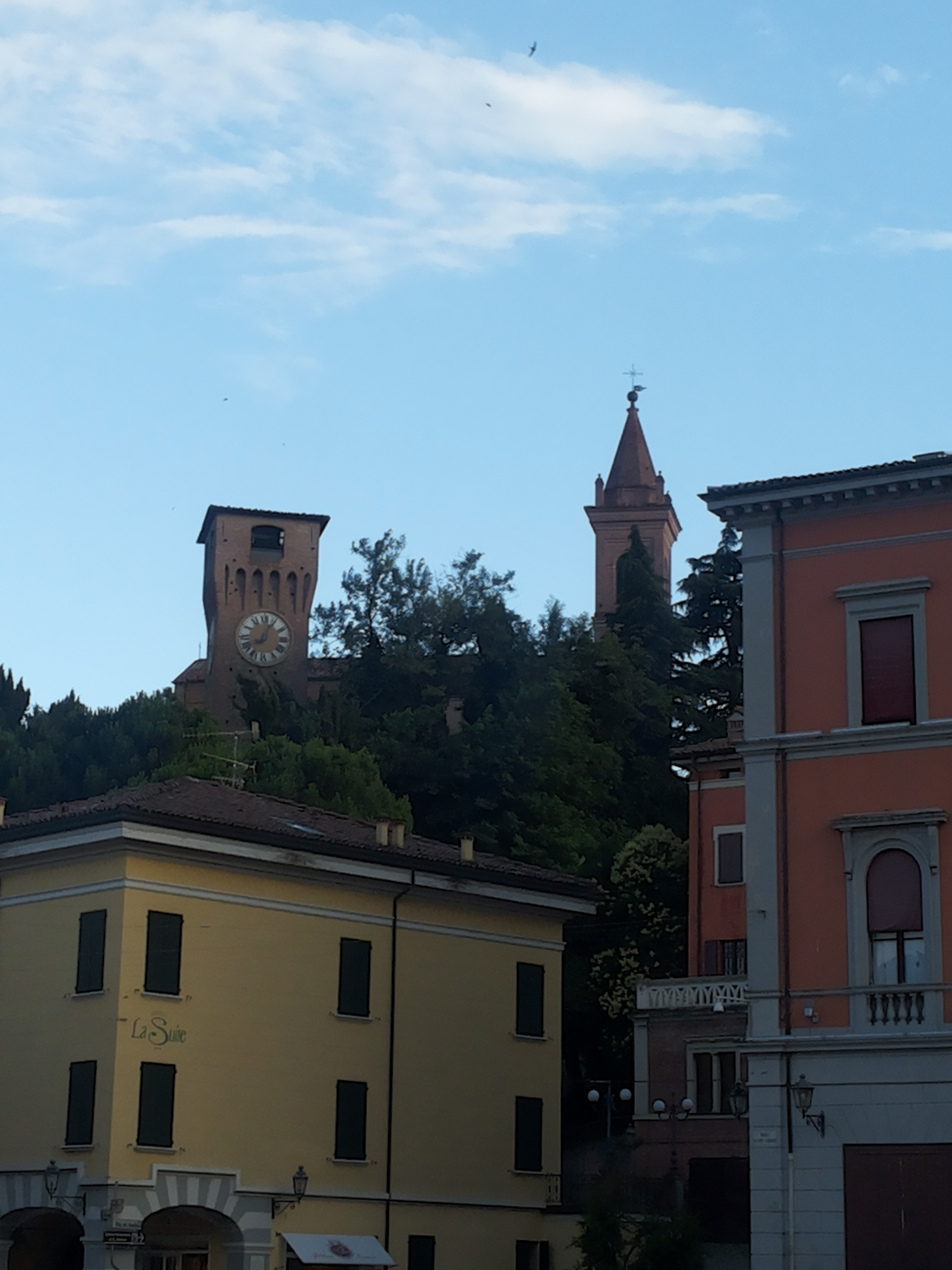
- A view of Bazzano.

- Flag Coat of arms

- Location within Italy Location within Emilia-Romagna
- Coordinates: 44°30′11″N 11°05′11″E
- Country: Italy
- Region: Emilia-Romagna
- Metropolitan city: Bologna (BO)
- Frazioni: Bazzano (communal seat), Bersagliera, Bortolani, Calcara, Castello di Serravalle, Crespellano, Fagnano, Maiola, Mercatello, Merlano, Montebudello, Monteveglio, Ponzano, Rodiano, Samoggia, San Biagio, San Prospero, Santa Croce, Savigno, Serravalle, Stiore-Oliveto, Tiola, Vedegheto, Vignola dei Conti, Zappolino, Ziribega

Government
  - Mayor: Daniele Ruscigno

Area
  - Total: 178.13 km^{2} (68.78 sq mi)
- Elevation: 182 m (597 ft)

Population (31 December 2019)
  - Total: 31,498
  - Density: 176.83/km^{2} (457.98/sq mi)
- Demonym: Samodiani
- Time zone: UTC+1 (CET)
  - Summer (DST): UTC+2 (CEST)
- Postal code: 40050
- Dialing code: 051
- Patron saint: St. John XXIII
- Saint day: 11 October
- Website: Official website

Valsamoggia (Bolognese: Valsamûz) is a comune in the Metropolitan City of Bologna, Emilia-Romagna, Italy. It was created on 1 January 2014 after the merger of the former communes of Bazzano (the current town hall seat), Castello di Serravalle, Crespellano, Monteveglio and Savigno.

The Italian painters, Alessandro Scorzoni and Antonino Sartini, were born in this municipality.

The frazione of Zappolino in the Middle Ages was the location of a battle between the communes of Modena and Bologna.
