= Santa Maria Assunta in Cielo, Roccantica =

Building in Roccantica, Italy

Santa Maria Assunta in Cielo is the main Roman Catholic parish church in the town of Roccantica, in the province of Rieti, region of Lazio, Italy.

== History ==
This church was built atop the ruins of an older church, wrecked by the 1702 earthquake of Amatrice. The reconstruction was patronized by a posthumus donation by a Paolo Leonardi. Reconsecrated in 1743, the new church had a single nave with six chapels. The 16th-century baptismal font and the main altarpiece are attributed to Bartolomeo Torresani, and derive from the former church of San Valentino. Of that Romanesque church, the apse is now used as a monument to the fallen in the 20th-century wars. In addition, the church has two statues of the Virgin; one, the Madonna di Piedirocca. It also has a small statue of San Valentino, the town patron saint.
