= Savigno =

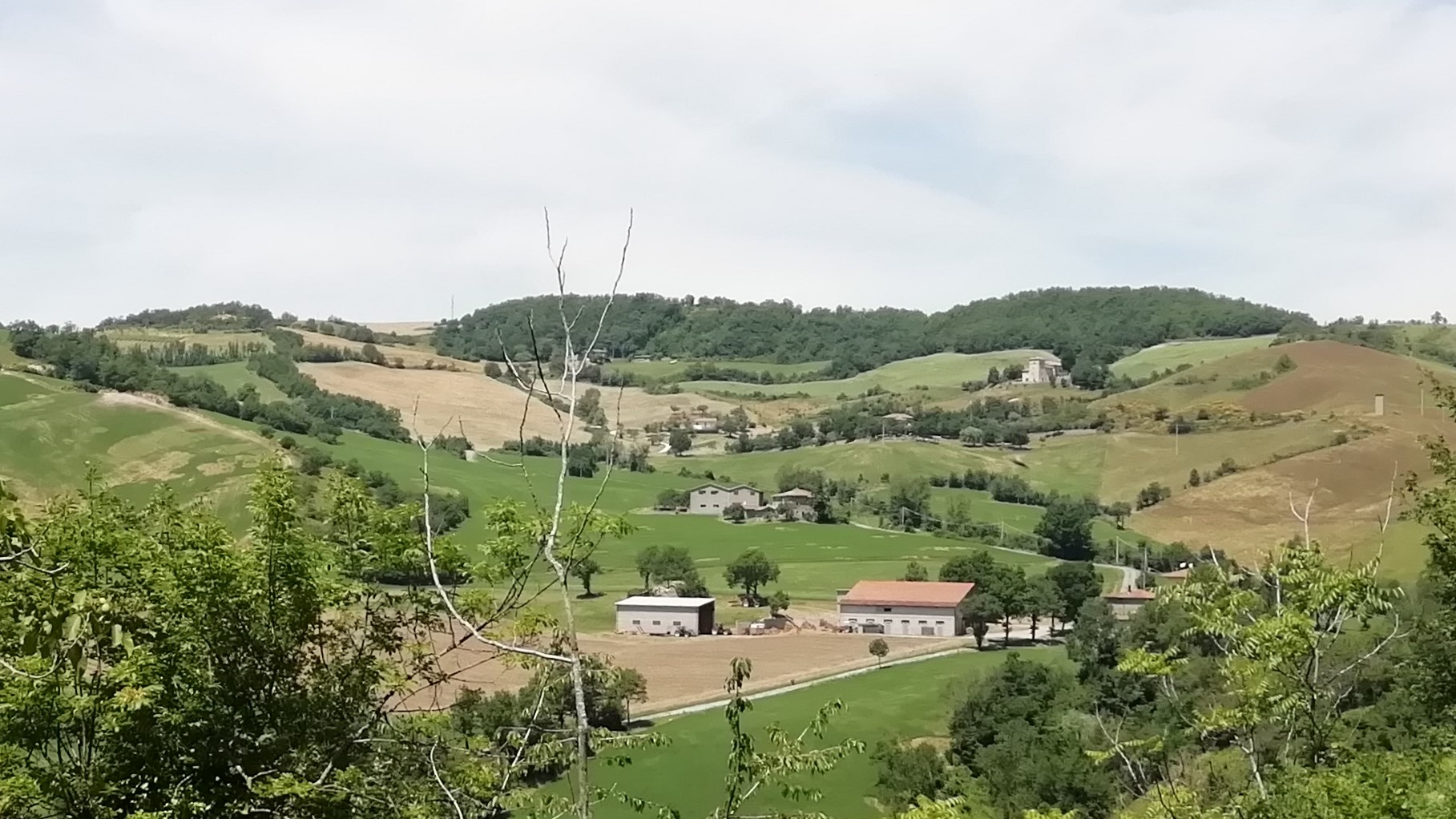

Savigno is a frazione of the comune (municipality) of Valsamoggia in the Province of Bologna in the Italian region Emilia-Romagna, located about 25 kilometres (16 mi) southwest of Bologna. It was an independent commune until 2014.
