= Lupara, Molise =

Lupara
- Comune
- Comune di Lupara
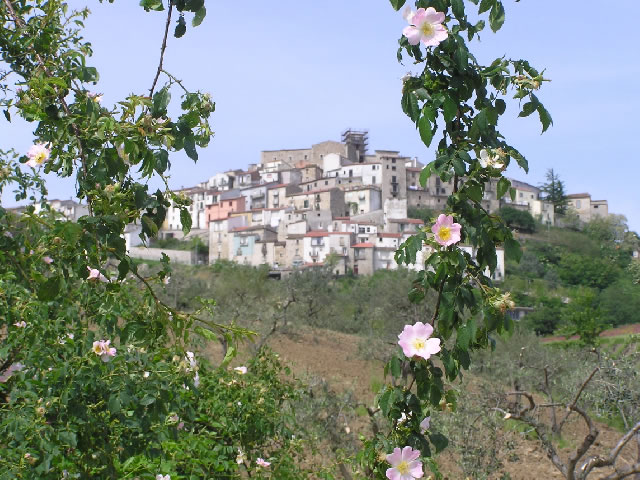
- Panorama of Lupara

- Coat of arms

- Location within Italy Location within Molise
- Coordinates: 41°46′N 14°44′E
- Country: Italy
- Region: Molise
- Province: Campobasso (CB)

Government
  - Mayor: Pasqualino Morinelli

Area
  - Total: 25.6 km^{2} (9.9 sq mi)
- Elevation: 505 m (1,657 ft)

Population (30 November 2017)
  - Total: 484
  - Density: 18.9/km^{2} (49.0/sq mi)
- Demonym: Luparesi
- Time zone: UTC+1 (CET)
  - Summer (DST): UTC+2 (CEST)
- Postal code: 86030
- Dialing code: 0874
- Website: Official website

Lupara is a comune (municipality) in the Province of Campobasso in the Italian region Molise, located about 25 kilometres (16 mi) north of Campobasso.

Lupara borders the following municipalities: Casacalenda, Castelbottaccio, Civitacampomarano, Guardialfiera, Morrone del Sannio.
