= Biferno =

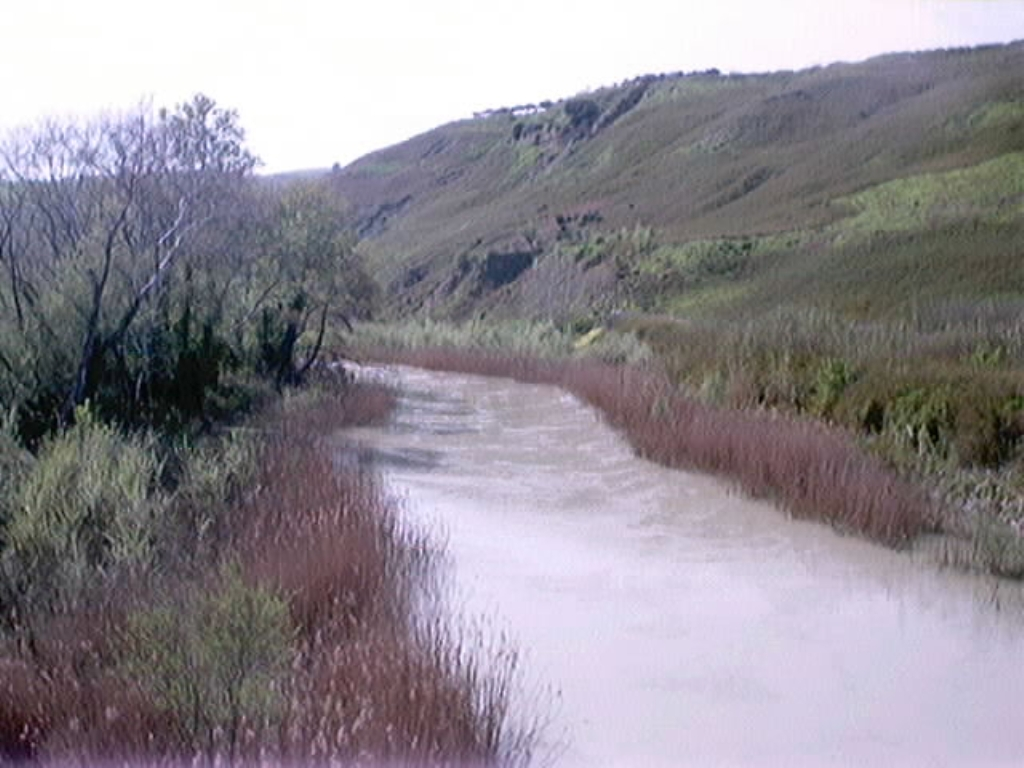

Location
- Country: Italy

Physical characteristics
- Mouth: Adriatic Sea
  - coordinates: 41.9800°N 15.0280°E

The Biferno is a river of Molise, in southern Italy. Its source is in the comune of Bojano and during the first few kilometres of its course, it receives the waters of numerous streams which flow from the Matese mountains. It runs through several comuni in the province of Campobasso, forming the Lake of Guardialfiera and finally flows into the Adriatic Sea.

== History ==
In ancient Roman times, the river was known as Tifernus.

== Biferno DOC ==
Italian wine, both red, white and rose, under the Biferno DOC appellation comes from this area. The DOC covers 135 ha (333 acres) along the river. Red and rose wines are blends of 60–70% Montepulciano, 15–20% Trebbiano, 15–20% Aglianico and other local grape varieties up to 5%. The grapes are limited to a harvest yield of 12 tonnes/ha and the wine must attain at least 11.5% alcohol level. The white wines are blends of 65–70% Trebbiano, 25-30% Bombino bianco and 5–10% Malvasia bianco. The white grapes are limited to a harvest yield of 12 tonnes/ha and must attain a minimum 10.5% alcohol content.

== See also ==
- List of Italian DOC wines
