= Santa Maria Assunta in Cielo, Vitorchiano =

Church in Vitorchiano, Italy

Coordinates: 42.470633°N 12.174591°E

Santa Maria Assunta in Cielo is a Romanesque style Roman Catholic church in Vitorchiano in the province of Viterbo, region of Lazio, Italy.

== History ==
This church was erected in the second half of the 13th century. The later bell-tower has mullioned windows and decorative columns. The facade has a large rose window. The interior has some deteriorated frescoes depicting the Incredulity of St Thomas and the Baptism of Christ.
