= Acerra Cathedral =

Church building in Acerra, Italy

Acerra Cathedral Cathedral of the Assumption of Mary (Cattedrale di Santa Maria Assunta)
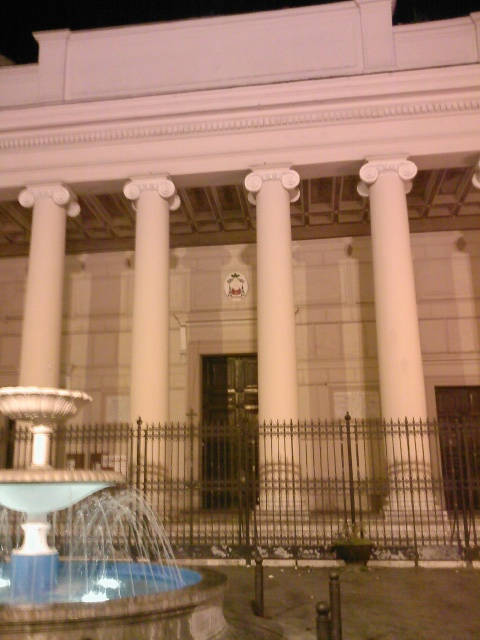
- West front of the cathedral

Religion
- Affiliation: Roman Catholic
- Province: Naples

Location
- Location: Acerra, Italy
- Interactive map of Acerra Cathedral; Cathedral of the Assumption of Mary (Cattedrale di Santa Maria Assunta)
- Coordinates: 40°56′36″N 14°22′22″E

Architecture
- Type: Church
- Style: Neo-classical
- Groundbreaking: 19c

Acerra Cathedral (Italian: Duomo di Acerra; Cattedrale di Santa Maria Assunta) is a Roman Catholic cathedral in the town of Acerra in Campania, southern Italy, dedicated to the Assumption of the Virgin Mary.

Since the 11th century it has been the seat of the Bishop of Acerra.

== History and description ==
The present Neoclassical cathedral stands on the site of an Ancient Roman temple of Hercules. It has been rebuilt many times and the present building is of the 19th century. It has a Latin cross ground plan, with a nave and two side aisles separated by piers, and a cupola. The west front is Neo-classical, with eight large Ionic columns standing on a chessboard paving of alternating basalt and marble slabs.

The cathedral contains a number of works of art, of which the principal are:

- altarpiece of the Assumption of the Virgin Mary, by Giacinto Diana (1796)
- painting of the Madonna with Rosary, by Giovan Bernardo Azzolino (17th century)
- painting of San Girolamo, by Fabrizio Santafede (17th century)
- carving in high relief, by the school of Giovanni da Nola
Location of Acerra Cathedral
