= Bazzano, Valsamoggia =

Frazione of Valsamoggia in Bologna, Italy

Bazzano
- Frazione
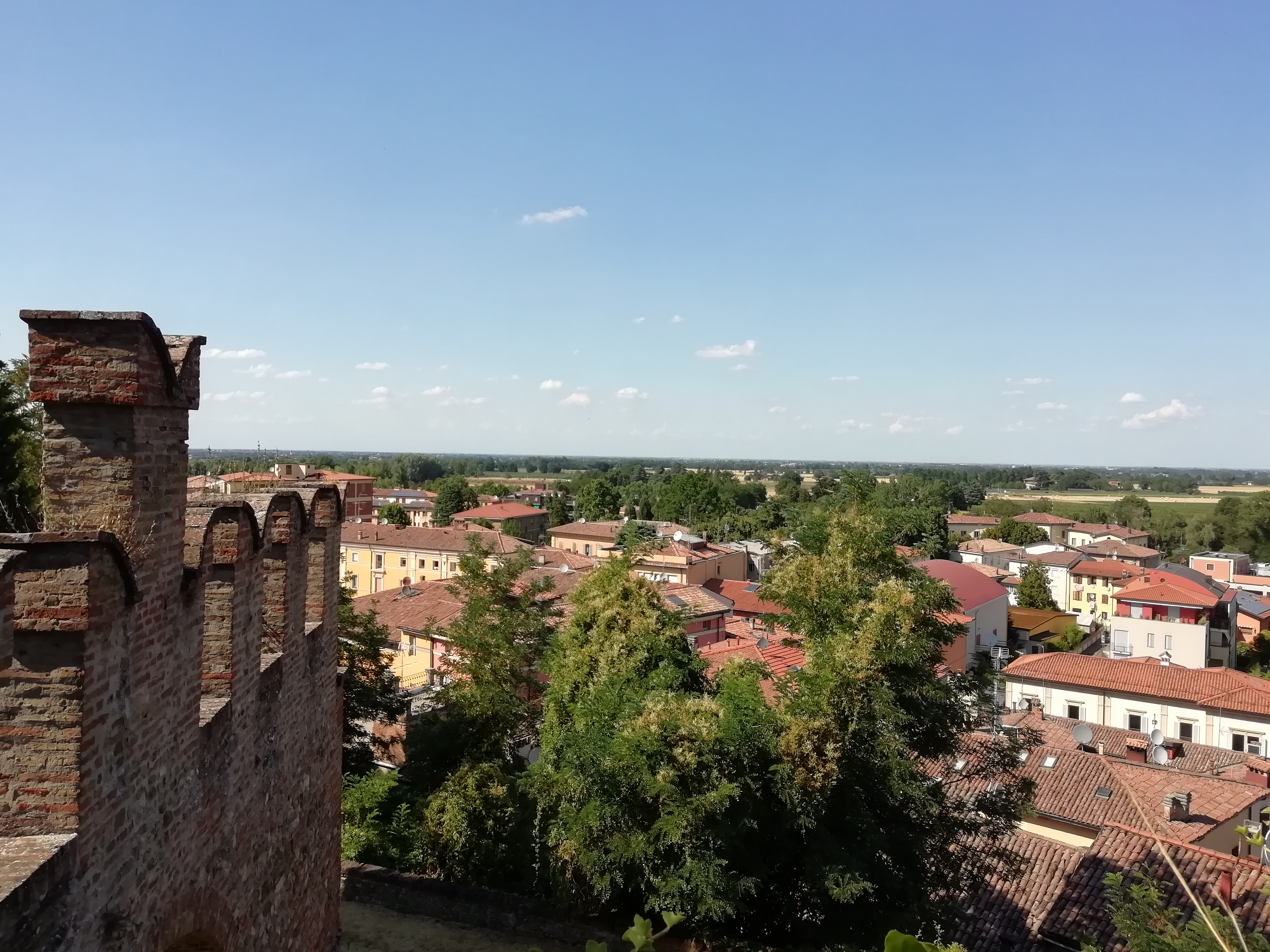
- Interactive map of Bazzano
- Coordinates: 44°31′N 11°5′E
- Country: Italy
- City: Bologna
- Commune: Valsamoggia
- Elevation: 93 m (305 ft)
- Demonym: Bazzanesi

Bazzano is a frazione of the comune (municipality) of Valsamoggia in the Metropolitan City of Bologna in the Italian region Emilia-Romagna, located about 20 kilometres (12 mi) west of Bologna. It was an independent commune until 2014.

In this frazione [hamlet] of Valsamoggia, the painter Antonino Sartini died in 1954.
