= Accius (disambiguation) =

Accius was a Latin poet of the 16th century.

Accius may also refer to:

- Accia (gens), a Roman family from Pisaurum
- Cesare Antonio Accius, early 17th century engraver
- Lerema accius, butterfly commonly known as Clouded Skipper
- Lucius Accius, Roman tragic poet born in 170 BC
- Titus Accius, prosecutor in the murder trial of Aulus Cluentius Habitus
- Operation ACCIUS, Canadian military contribution to the civilian-led United Nations Assistance Mission in Afghanistan
