= Sassia (1st century BC) =

Ancient Roman woman of the 1st century BCE

Sassia was a woman of Larinum in ancient Rome who lived in the 1st century BCE. She was notable for her role in some events described in Cicero's speech Pro Cluentio.

She was married three times. Her first husband was Aulus Cluentius Habitus, with whom she had a son Aulus Cluentius A. f. Habitus and a daughter, Cluentia. After the elder Cluentius's death, she married her son-in-law, Aulus Aurius Melinus, the widower of her late daughter Cluentia.

Melinus was preparing to accuse Statius Albius Oppianicus -- Sassia's former brother-in-law, who had been married to Sassia's first husband's sister, also named Cluentia -- of the murder of a kinsman, when Oppianicus was appointed chief magistrate of Larinum and managed to have Melinus included in Sulla's proscriptions, during which Melinus was killed.

After Melinus's death, Oppianicus proposed marriage, but Sassia rejected him on account of him having children from a previous marriage, and said she could not marry him unless he killed two of his three sons. Oppianicus obliged and murdered his children, after which he became Sassia's third husband.

In 74 BCE, the younger Cluentius accused Oppianicus, his step-father, in court of trying to poison him, a crime of which Oppianicus was narrowly convicted, though many of the jurors were themselves subsequently convicted of accepting bribes.

After the elder Oppianicus died, the younger Cluentius was accused of his murder by Oppianicus's son, also named Oppianicus, supposedly with the support of Sassia, who disliked her son. At the trial in 66 BCE, Cluentius was defended by the orator Cicero, whose defense speech, Pro Cluentio, still exists. In it, Cicero paints both the younger Oppianicus and Sassia as villains.

Cicero alleged that the elder Oppianicus left Sassia after she had an affair with a plebeian named Sextus Albius, and Oppianicus was not poisoned at all, and instead died from a fever after being thrown from his horse. Cluentius was acquitted, though modern scholars believe he did, in fact, murder his step-father.

During all these trials, Sassia lost her good name but held on to her fortune, and was never convicted or imprisoned of any crime.
