= Dinaea =

Ancient Roman woman of the 1st century BCE

Dinaea was a wealthy woman of ancient Rome who lived in Larinum in the 1st century BCE. She is notable for her role in some events described in Cicero's speech Pro Cluentio, having controlled a substantial portion of the wealth of the Auria gens, and possibly been murdered for this fact.

She was married twice, and bore two children to each husband, two Aurii (Marcus Aurius and Numerius Aurius), and two Magii (son Gnaeus Magius and daughter Magia). She believed she had outlived all her children, but on discovering that the missing and presumed-dead Marcus Aurius was actually alive and being held captive in a slave house in Ager Gallicus, she called upon her relatives to rescue her last surviving child, redrew her will to make him co-heir with her grandson Oppianicus, and then promptly died.

The writer Cicero implies that she had been poisoned directly or indirectly by her son-in-law Statius Albius Oppianicus, husband of the late Magia, and father of Dinaea's grandson Oppianicus, and also that the elder Oppianicus either manipulated or outright forged her will to leave him in control of her estate, disinheriting Marcus Aurius whom he later had kidnapped and murdered.
