= Cluentia gens =

Ancient Roman family

The gens Cluentia was a Roman family of the late Republic. The gens first appears during the Social War, in which Lucius Cluentius was general of the Pompeiian forces. The most famous family of the name lived at Larinum, where they and their cousins, the Aurii, fell victim to the machinations of Oppianicus, exposed by Cicero in his oration, Pro Cluentio.

== Origin ==
The Cluentii were probably of Oscan origin. Both Pompeii and Larinum, the towns with which the family was associated, were located within Oscan territory. Lucius Cluentius and the Pompeiian forces he commanded during the Social War fought against the Roman army under Sulla, so the Cluentii may not have gained Roman citizenship until the conclusion of the war.

== Branches and cognomina ==
The only cognomen associated with the Cluentii is Habitus, also found as Abitus and Avitus. Habitus might refer to a person's manner of dress, style, or bearing; Avitus is derived from an adjective, meaning "grandfatherly, ancestral," and thus might indicate the senior branch of a family.

== Members ==
This list includes abbreviated praenomina. For an explanation of this practice, see filiation.

- Lucius Cluentius, called Aulus Cluentius by Eutropius, was one of the Italian generals during the Social War. He commanded the Pompeiian troops against Sulla, and was at first victorious, but was subsequently defeated and slain.
- Aulus Cluentius Habitus, a respected citizen of Larinum, who died in 88 BC, leaving a widow, Sassia, a son and a daughter.
- Cluentia, sister of the elder Aulus Cluentius Habitus, married Statius Albius Oppianicus, by whom she was allegedly poisoned. Oppianicus subsequently married Cluentius' widow, Sassia.
- Aulus Cluentius A. f. Habitus, accused his stepfather, Oppianicus, of attempting to poison him. Oppianicus was convicted in 74 B.C., allegedly because the judge had been bribed. Eight years later, Cicero defended Cluentius on a similar charge made by Oppianicus' son.
- Cluentia A. f., sister of the younger Aulus Cluentius Habitus, married her cousin, Aulus Aurius Melinus. Her mother, Sassia, persuaded him to divorce her, and his death was procured by Cluentia's stepfather, Oppianicus.

== See also ==
- List of Roman gentes

== Bibliography ==
- Marcus Tullius Cicero, In Verrem, Pro Caecina, Pro Cluentio.
- Appianus Alexandrinus (Appian), Bellum Civile (The Civil War).
- Eutropius, Breviarium Historiae Romanae (Abridgement of the History of Rome).
- Dictionary of Greek and Roman Biography and Mythology, William Smith, ed., Little, Brown and Company, Boston (1849).
- D.P. Simpson, Cassell's Latin and English Dictionary, Macmillan Publishing Company, New York (1963).
