= Gaius Fidiculanius Falcula =

Roman senator

Gaius Fidiculanius Falcula (fl. around 70 BCE) was a senator of the late Roman Republic, of the gens Fidiculania. He is known only from the speeches of Cicero.

In 74 BCE, Falcula was one of the judges at the trial of Statius Albius Oppianicus, who was accused of attempting to poison his stepson, Aulus Cluentius Habitus. Falcula was involved in the general indignation that attended the conviction of Oppianicus. The majority of judges who condemned Oppianicus was very small. Falcula was accused by the tribune, Lucius Quintius, of having been illegally balloted into the concilium by Gaius Verres, at that time city praetor, for the express purpose of convicting Oppianicus, of voting out of his proper decuria, of giving sentence without hearing the evidence, of omitting to apply for an adjournment of the proceedings, and of receiving 40,000 sesterces as a bribe from the prosecutor, Cluentius. He was, however, acquitted, since his trial did not take place until after the excitement that followed Oppianicus's verdict, the Judicium Albianum, had in some measure subsided.

But eight years later, in 66 BCE, Falcula was again brought to public notice by Cicero, in his defence of Cluentius, Pro Cluentio. After recapitulating the circumstances of the Judicium Albianum, Cicero asks, if Falcula were innocent, who in the concilium at Oppianicus's trial could be guilty? This equivocal plea inferred, without asserting, the guilt of Falcula, in 74 BCE. In his defence of A. Caecina, in 69 BCE, Cicero ushers in the name of Falcula, a witness against the accused, with ironical pomp, and proceeds to point out gross inconsistencies in Falcula's evidence.

Great uncertainty is thrown over the history of Falcula by the circumstance that it suited Cicero to represent at different times, in different lights, the Judicium Albianum. When Cicero was pleading against Verres, Oppianicus was unjustly condemned, and Falcula was an illegal corrupt judge. When he defended Cluentius, it was necessary to soften the details of the Judicium Albianum. But when he spoke for Caecina, it was his interest to direct public feeling against Falcula.
