= Accia gens =

Plebeian family at ancient Rome

The gens Accia was a plebeian family at ancient Rome during the late Republic. The gens is known primarily from two individuals, Lucius Accius, a tragic poet of the second century BC, and Titus Accius, best known for his prosecution of Aulus Cluentius Habitus in Cicero's oration Pro Cluentio. Other Accii are known from inscriptions.

== Origin ==
The most famous members of this gens, Lucius and Titus Accius, were from the town of Pisaurum, although it is not known whether or how they were related. Pisaurum was founded as a Roman colonia in the Ager Gallicus in 184 BC. This region had been settled by the Senones during the fourth century BC, and was later divided between Umbria and Cisalpine Gaul, with Pisaurum being included in Umbria. Pisaurum itself is not mentioned as a city prior to its establishment as a Roman colony. Its earliest inhabitants were Romans, but early sources describe the natives of this area as Picentes, among whom there were probably also Umbrians, Etruscans, and Gauls. A large number of Accii are known from inscriptions of central Italy, from Umbria to Samnium, and adjoining regions, so nothing definite can be said of their ethnicity.

== Praenomina ==
Most of the Accii bore very common praenomina, including Gaius, Lucius, Marcus, Titus, Publius, and Quintus. There are individual instances of Gnaeus, Numerius, and Spurius.

== Members ==
This list includes abbreviated praenomina. For an explanation of this practice, see filiation.

- Lucius Accius, also found as Attius, was one of the earliest tragic poets at Rome. He was the son of a freedman, and modeled most of his tragedies on Aeschylus and other Greek examples, but he also wrote Praetextata, works on Roman subjects, an Annales, or history of Rome in verse, and some prose works, including a history of poetry. He was greatly admired for his language, but only fragments of his works are preserved.
- Titus Accius, an eques from Pisaurum, who in 66 BC undertook the prosecution of Aulus Cluentius Habitus for the alleged murder of his stepfather, Statius Albius Oppianicus. Cluentius was famously defended by Cicero in his oration Pro Cluentio. Accius had studied rhetoric under Hermagoras, and Cicero praises him for his careful and deliberate style and command of Latin.

=== Accii from inscriptions ===
- Accia C. l., a freedwoman named in an inscription from Rome.
- Accius, named in an inscription from Praeneste in Latium, dating between AD 14 and 16.
- Accius, buried at Venusia in Samnium.
- Accius Amoenitae l., a freedman buried at the present site of Segoyuela de los Cornejos, near Salmantica in Hispania Citerior, aged eighty.
- Gaius Accius, the former master of Accius Antiochus and Accia, according to an inscription from Rome.
- Gaius Accius, the father of Marcus, and perhaps the former master of Gaius Accius Dio.
- Gaius Accius, the former master of Gaius Accius of Mevania.
- Gaius Accius, the father of Gaius Accius Faber.
- Gaius Accius C. l., a freedman named in an inscription from Mevania in Umbria.
- Lucius Accius, the father of Lucius Accius Calvius.
- Lucius Accius M. f., named in an inscription from Aquileia in Venetia and Histria.
- Marcus Accius, the father of Lucius Accius of Aquileia.
- Marcus Accius, the father of Marcus, the quattuorvir.
- Marcus Accius, the former master of Marcus Accius Primus.
- Marcus Accius, the father of Marcus Accius of Hatria.
- Marcus Accius, the husband of Accia Valentina, to whom he dedicated a monument at Colonia Claudia Ara Agrippinensium in Germania Inferior.
- Marcus Accius C. f., buried at Reate in Samnium, probably the former master of Gaius Accius Dio.
- Marcus Accius M. f., one of the quattuorviri jure dicundo at Volcei in Lucania, according to an inscription dating from the mid-first century BC.
- Marcus Accius M. f., named in an inscription from Hatria in Venetia and Histria.
- Numerius Accius, the former master of Numerius Accius Philonicus.
- Publius Accius, the father of Gaius Accius Ruficanus.
- Publius Accius, the former master of Publius Accius Athictus and Accia Horrea.
- Publius Accius Q. f., the father of Quintus Accius Aco Auditus.
- Quintus Accius, the father of Quintus Accius Masculus.
- Quintus Accius, the grandfather of Quintus Accius Aco Auditus.
- Quintus Accius Fus[...], named in an inscription from Ateste in Venetia and Histria.
- Spurius Accius, the father of Gaius Accius Tiro.
- Titus Accius, the former master of Titus Accius Simplicius, Titus Accius Paelinus, Titus Accius Vitalis, Accia Nais, Titus Accius Cerealis, Titus Accius Salvus, Titus Accius Tiro, and Accia Thabis.
- Quintus Accius P. f. Q. n. Aco(?) Auditus, named in an inscription from Hatria.
- Accia Amabilis, named in a funerary inscription from Salona in Dalmatia.
- Accius C. l. Antiochus, a freedman named in an inscription from Rome.
- Publius Accius P. l. Athictus, a freedman, and the husband of Accia Horrea, was one of the Seviri at Aquileia.
- Lucius Accius Augurinus, a soldier buried at Rome.
- Lucius Accius Caeno, buried at the present site of Hinojosa de Duero, formerly part of Lusitania, aged fifty.
- Lucius Accius L. f. Calvius, buried at Altinum in Venetia and Histria.
- Titus Accius T. l. Cerealis, a freedman named in a funerary inscription from Corfinium in Samnium.
- Marcus Accius Crescens, buried at Norba in Lusitania, aged sixty years.
- Gaius Accius C. M. l. Dio, a freedman buried at Reate.
- Gaius Accius Diodatus, dedicated a monument to his beloved Primilla at Caesarobriga in Lusitania.
- Gaius Accius C. f. Faber, named in an inscription from Hatria.
- Marcus Accius Felix, one of the vigiles at Rome, named in an inscription dating to about AD 210.
- Marcus Accius Florus, buried at Gades in Hispania Baetica, aged seventy-five, together with Accia Stratonice.
- Accius Granius, died six days before the Kalends of September in AD 409, and buried at Altava in Mauretania Caesariensis, aged seventy-five.
- Gaius Accius Hedychrus, made a libationary offering to Mithras at Emerita Augusta in Lusitania.
- Accia Hel[...], named in a funerary inscription found at Campodipietra in Samnium.
- Accia Horrea, a freedwoman, and the wife of Publius Accius Athictus, with whom she was buried at Aquileia.
- Lucius Accius Justus, made an offering at Rome during the reign of Septimius Severus and Caracalla, early in the third century.
- Lucius Accius Lemnus, made an offering at Narbo in Gallia Narbonensis.
- Gnaeus Accius Mahes, named in a dedicatory inscription from Rome.
- Accius Marcianus, died eleven days before the Kalends of November in AD 444, and buried at Altava, aged fifty-two.
- Titus Accius Marcus, buried at Virunum in Noricum with his wife, Saturnina, and son, Accius Maximus.
- Lucius Accius Mascel, buried at Cirta in Numidia, aged fifty.
- Quintus Accius Q. f. Masculus, buried at Corduba in Hispania Baetica.
- Accius Maximus, Decurion of the colonia at Aquincum in Pannonia Inferior.
- Accius T. f. Maximus, son of Titus Accius Marcus and Saturnina, buried with his parents at Virunum, aged twenty-two. He was a soldier in the Second Legion.
- Publius Accius Mercurius, named in an inscription from Cortona in Etruria.
- Accia Nais, a freedwoman, named in a funerary inscription from Corfinium.
- Titus Accius T. l. Paelinus, a freedman named in a funerary inscription from Corfinium.
- Numerius Accius N. l. Philonicus, a freedman named in a funerary inscription found at Campodipietra.
- Marcus Accius M. l. Primus, a vestiarius, or clothier, buried at Narbo.
- Lucius Accius Reburrus Ter(mestinus?), buried at Salmantica in Lusitania, aged sixteen.
- Quintus Accius Rogatianus Caecilianus, sacerdos maximus, a high-ranking priest, named in an inscription found at Choud el-Batel, formerly part of Africa Proconsularis, dating to the reign of Marcus Julius Philippus.
- Gaius Accius P. f. Ruficanus, a veteran of the twelfth cohort of the Praetorian Guard at Rome.
- Titus Accius T. l. Salvus, a freedman, son of Titus Accius Tiro and Accia Thabis, who dedicated a monument to him at Corfinium.
- Titus Accius T. f. Secundus, named in a libationary inscription from Axima in the province of Alpes Poeninae.
- Titus Accius Severus, gave a libationary offering to Jupiter Optimus Maximus, according to an inscription found at Krapina in Croatia.
- Titus Accius T. l. Simplicius, a freedman named in a funerary inscription from Corfinium.
- Accius Statutus, named in a dedicatory inscription from Liternum in Campania.
- Accia Stratonice, buried at Gades, aged sixty-five, together with Marcus Accius Florus.
- Lucius Accius Terentus, made an offering to Jupiter, according to a libationary inscription from Atina in Latium, dating to either AD 114 or 144.
- Gaius Accius Tertius, dedicated a monument to his brother, Gaius Julius Donatus, who was buried at Altava, aged about twenty.
- Accia T. l. Thabis, a freedwoman, was the wife of Titus Accius Tiro and mother of Titus Accius Salvus.
- Gaius Accius S. f. Tiro, buried at Carthage in Africa Proconsularis.
- Titus Accius T. l. Tiro, a freedman, was the husband of Accia Thabis, and father of Titus Accius Salvus.
- Accia Valentina, a freedwoman, and the wife of Marcus Accius, buried at Colonia Claudia Ara Agrippinensium.
- Lucius Accius Venustus, named in an inscription from Philippi in Macedonia.
- Lucius Accius Vitalis, made an offering at Madaurus in Africa Proconsularis.
- Titus Accius T. l. Vitalis, a freedman, and one of the seviri at Corfinium.
- Lucius Accius Zosimianus, buried at Salona, aged thirteen.
- Marcus Flavius Accius, a soldier in the Twenty-Second Legion, buried at Aquae Statiellae in Liguria.

== See also ==
- List of Roman gentes

== Bibliography ==
- Marcus Tullius Cicero, Brutus, De Legibus, Pro Archia Poeta, Pro Cluentio, Pro Plancio, Pro Sestio.
- Titus Livius (Livy), History of Rome.
- Quintus Horatius Flaccus (Horace), Epistulae.
- Gaius Plinius Secundus (Pliny the Elder), Historia Naturalis (Natural History).
- Marcus Fabius Quintilianus (Quintilian), Institutio Oratoria (Institutes of Oratory).
- Claudius Ptolemaeus (Ptolemy), Geographia.
- Aulus Gellius, Noctes Atticae (Attic Nights).
- Dictionary of Greek and Roman Biography and Mythology, William Smith, ed., Little, Brown and Company, Boston (1849).
- Dictionary of Greek and Roman Geography, William Smith, ed., Little, Brown and Company, Boston (1854).
- Theodor Mommsen et alii, Corpus Inscriptionum Latinarum (The Body of Latin Inscriptions, abbreviated CIL), Berlin-Brandenburgische Akademie der Wissenschaften (1853–present).
- Ettore Pais, Corporis inscriptionum Latinarum supplementa Italica (Italian Supplement to the Corpus Inscriptionum Latinarum), Rome (1884).
- René Cagnat et alii, L'Année épigraphique (The Year in Epigraphy, abbreviated AE), Presses Universitaires de France (1888–present).
- Bruna Forlati Tamaro, "Inscrizioni Inedite di Adria" (Unedited Inscriptions from Adria, abbreviated "IlAdria"), in Epigraphica, vol. 18, pp. 50–76 (1956).
- Jean Marcillet-Jaubert, Les Inscriptions d’Altava (The Inscriptions of Altava, abbreviated IdAltava), Aix-en-Provence (1968).
- Brigitte and Hartmut Galsterer, Die Römischen Steininschriften aus Köln (The Roman Stone Inscriptions of Cologne, abbreviated RSK), Cologne (1975).
- Ángeles Alonso Ávila and Santos Crespo Ortiz de Zárate, Corpus de Inscripciones Romanas de la Provincia de Salamanca (The Body of Roman Inscriptions from the Province of Salamanca, abbreviated CIRPSalamanca), Valladolid (1999).
