= Marcus Aurius =

Ancient Roman nobleman of the 1st century BCE

- Born: 1st century BCE; Larinum, Ancient Rome
- Died: 89 BCE (approximately); Ager Gallicus, Ancient Rome
- Cause of death: Assassination
- Military career
- Allegiance: Ancient Rome
- Branch: Military
- Known for: Central figure in Cicero's Pro Cluentio, Prisoner in the Social War
- Conflicts: Social War (Battle of Asculum)

Marcus Aurius was a nobleman of ancient Rome, of the Auria gens of Larinum. He lived in the 1st century BCE, and was a fighter in the Social War, and was one of the notable characters in Cicero's speech Pro Cluentio.

He was the son of the wealthy Dinaea, and brother to Numerius Aurius, Gnaeus Magius, and Magia. He was taken prisoner in the Battle of Asculum in 89 BCE, after which he fell into the hands of Quintus Sergius, who confined him in the ergastulum (slave prison) on his estate in Ager Gallicus. Virtually everyone believed him dead.

During this time it transpired that all of Marcus's siblings died, and it became known that Marcus was a captive of Sergius, and Dinaea, on discovering that she still had one surviving child pleaded for his release and urged her relations to bring every power they had to bear in securing his freedom. Shortly thereafter, she fell ill, and designated the younger Oppianicus—her grandson and late daughter's child by Statius Albius Oppianicus—as her heir, but also left a fortune of 400,000 sestertii to her son Marcus. An expedition of Marcus's kin set out for Ager Gallicus, led by the informant who had told Dinaea that Marcus still lived.

Meanwhile Statius Albius Oppianicus bribed the informant to lead the party astray and delay their arrival, and also paid a group of people to kidnap and murder Marcus, in order that his young son—and by extension, himself—might enjoy the full inheritance. This group succeeded in assassinating Marcus, though the elder Oppianicus's scheme was exposed.
