= Accia =

Accia may refer to:

- Accia (gens), a Roman gens
- Diocese of Accia, on Corsica, disestablished 1544
- Plukenetia (syn. Accia), a genus of plant of the family Euphorbiaceae
