= Spedia gens =

Ancient Roman family

The gens Spedia was an obscure plebeian family at ancient Rome. No members of this gens are mentioned in ancient writers, but many are known from inscriptions, and several were locally important, serving as duumvirs at Antinum in Samnium, Pompeii in Campania, and Sarmizegetusa in Dacia.

== Origin ==
The nomen Spedius is probably of Oscan origin, as many of the inscriptions of this gens are from Samnium and surrounding regions in central and southern Italy, and the early Spedii used a number of Oscan praenomina.

== Praenomina ==
The Spedii used a variety of common praenomina, chiefly Lucius, Gaius, Publius, and Quintus. The older epigraphy shows that they used the less-common praenomina Vibius, Numerius, and Salvius, all of which were typical in families from Oscan-speaking regions.

== Members ==
This list includes abbreviated praenomina. For an explanation of this practice, see filiation.

- Spedia, buried at Portus in Latium, with a monument from her husband Lucius Larg[...], dating to the reign of Hadrian.
- Spedia, dedicated a second-century tomb at Saepinum in Samnium for her father, Gaius Aedius Crescens, one of the Seviri Augustales.
- Spedia P. l., a freedwoman named in a sepulchral inscription from Bononia in Cisalpine Gaul.
- Spedia Q. f. M. n., dedicated a tomb at Atina in Latium, dating from the Julio-Claudian dynasty, for her father, Quintus Spedius.
- Spedia, or Cerrinia Celerina, buried at Beneventum in Samnium, with a monument from her husband, Gaius Liconius Celer, to whom she had been married for forty-seven years and eight months.
- Spedius, buried at Rome, in a tomb dedicated by his wife, whose name has not been preserved.
- Spedius, named in a pottery inscription from Altinum in Venetia and Histria.
- Spedius, dedicated a tomb at Carales in Sardinia, for his brother, Rufus Valentinus, the son of Tabusus, aged thirty, a soldier in the cohort of the Aquitani, in the middle part of the first century.
- Spedius, a centurion serving in the Legio X Gemina at Carnuntum in Pannonia Superior in AD 68.
- Spedius, mentioned in an inscription from Rome, dating to AD 438.
- Gnaeus Spedius Q. f., along with his brother, Lucius, mother, Maria, and sister-in-law, Varia, dedicated a tomb at Terventum in Samnium for his brother, Quintus Spedius Albanus.
- Lucius Spedius, one of the Seviri Augustales, honoured by an inscription at Brundisium in Calabria, dating from AD 32 or 33.
- Lucius Spedius Q. f., along with his brother, Gnaeus, mother, Maria, and sister-in-law, Varia, dedicated a tomb at Terventum in Samnium for his brother, Quintus Spedius Albanus.
- Lucius Spedius Sal. f., named in an inscription from Aquileia in Venetia and Histria, dating from the first half of the first century BC, along with his brother, Publius.
- Publius Spedius, named in a first-century inscription from Abellinum in Samnium.
- Publius Spedius P. f., one of the quattuorvirs at Antinum in Samnium, buried in a second-century tomb dedicated by Spedia Felicia and Spedia Optata.
- Publius Spedius P. f., named in an inscription from Narona in Dalmatia, dating from the first century, or the first half of the second.
- Publius Spedius Sal. f., named in an inscription from Aquileia, dating from the first half of the first century BC, along with his brother, Lucius.
- Quintus Spedius M. f., buried at Atina, in a tomb dating from the Julio-Claudian dynasty, dedicated by his daughter, Spedia.
- Quintus Spedius P. f., buried at Supinum Vicus in Sabinum, aged twenty-seven, in a tomb dedicated by his parents.
- Titus Spedius V. f., buried at Parma in Cisalpine Gaul during the latter half of the first century, along with his wife, Satria.
- Gaius Arrius Spedius Actianus, a man of senatorial rank, named in a late third- or early fourth-century inscription from Abellinum.
- Publius Spedius P. l. Adjutor, a freedman named in an inscription from Narona, dating from the second century, or the latter half of the first.
- Quintus Spedius Q. f. Albanus, buried at Terventum, aged twenty-three, in a tomb dating from the first half of the first century, dedicated by his wife, Varia, mother, Maria, and brothers, Lucius and Gnaeus Spedius.
- Lucius Spedius L. l. Amandus, a freedman who was selected as one of the magistrates of the Vicus Salutaris, a ward of the tenth region of Rome, in AD 136.
- Spedius Antymo[...], named in a first-century inscription from Herculaneum in Campania.
- Spedia Apula, buried at Beneventum, aged thirty-two years, six months, and six days, in a tomb dedicated by her husband, Gaius Umbrius Primus, to whom she had been married for seven years, seven months, and seven days.
- Gaius Spedius C. f. Asiaticus, built a sepulchre at Corfinium in Sabinum for his parents, Gaius Spedius Atimetus, and Allidia Statuta, dating between AD 1 and 70.
- Spedius Atimetus, dedicated a tomb at Valva in Lucania, for his old nurse, Castricius Marcianus, dating between AD 170 and 250.
- Gaius Spedius Atimetus, one of the Seviri Augustales, buried at Corfinium, along with his wife, Allidia Statuta, in a tomb dedicated by their son, Gaius Spedius Asiaticus.
- Gaius Spedius C. f. Bassus, a boy buried at Cosilinum in Lucania, aged six years, ten months, along with his sister, Spedia Galla, in a tomb dating from the time of Augustus.
- Spedia Callisto, a freedwoman buried at Ravenna in Cisalpine Gaul during the latter half of the second century, in a tomb dedicated by Spedia Fortunata.
- Lucius Spedius L. f. Capitulus, named in an inscription from Atria in Venetia and Histria.
- Spedia Chreste, named in an inscription from Rome, dating from the first half of the first century.
- Lucius Spedius Chrysanthus, buried at Palmyra in Syria.
- Spedia Clara, probably the wife of Publius Libarius, dedicated a tomb at Abellinum, dating from the early or middle first century, for herself, Gaius Hostius, and Gaius Tullius Clemens.
- Gaius Spedius Clemens, duumvir of the colony of Sarmizegetusa, where he dedicated a tomb for his wife, Cornelia Faustina, dating to the first half of the second century.
- Marcus Spedius M. f. Corbulo, a native of Hippo in Africa Proconsularis, a soldier named in a military diploma from Syria, dating from AD 105.
- Spedia L. C. l. Cuca, a freedwoman named in a first-century inscription from Rome.
- Gaius Spedius C. f. Cyrenaeus, a soldier in the century of Firmus, in the fifth cohort of an unspecified military unit stationed at Mons Claudianus in Egypt, where they dedicated a shrine to Apollo at the Hydreuma.
- Numerius Spedius V. f. Dexsanicus, buried at Aeclanum in Samnium, during the late first century BC, or the early first century AD.
- Publius Spedius P. l. Dionysius, a freedman named in a sepulchral inscription from Rome, dating from the first half of the first century.
- Spedia Euplia, dedicated a monument at Ostia for a slave-child, Parthenope, aged one year, eleven months, and twenty-five days.
- Spedia L. l. Eutaxia, a freedwoman who dedicated a tomb at Rome for her husband, the freedman Amianthus.
- Spedia Felicia, along with Spedia Optata, dedicated a second-century tomb at Antinum to Publius Spedius, the quattuorvir.
- Spedia Felicissima, dedicated a tomb at Aeclanum for her husband, Lucudeius Festinus.
- Gaius Spedius Felix, buried at Lacum Mephiticum in Samnium, with a monument from his client, Spedia Maximina.
- Lucius Spedius Firmus, buried at Rome in a second-century tomb dedicated by his wife, Aurelia Felicissima.
- Quintus Spedius Q. f. Firmus, one of the duumvirs at Pompeii in Campania during the late first century BC, or early first century AD.
- Spedia P. f. Fortunata, buried at Rome, along with her father, Publius Spedius Successus, in a tomb dedicated by her mother, Artemas.
- Spedia Fortunata, dedicated a tomb for Spedia Callisto at Ravenna, dating to the latter half of the second century.
- Spedia C. f. Galla, a little girl buried at Cosilinum, aged two years, ten months, along with her brother, Gaius Spedius, in a tomb dating to the time of Augustus.
- Spedia Helpis, a freedwoman buried at Patrae in Achaia during the second century, perhaps dedicated by a Fortunatus.
- Gaius Spedius Hermias, flamen of the colony of Sarmizegethusa in Dacia, made an offering to Aesculapius and Hygeia during the second or early third century.
- Spedia L. l. Laudica, a freedwoman, dedicated a monument at Casilinum in Campania, dating to the late first century BC, or early first century AD, for herself and her son, Lucius Spedius Pamphilus.
- Marcus Spedius Magnus, buried in a late first-century tomb at Rome, dedicated by his wife, Scoedia Herois.
- Spedia Marcelina, dedicated a monument at Narona in Dalmatia to her son, Spedius Paulinus, dating from the third century, or the latter half of the second.
- Spedia L. f. Marcia, a little girl buried in a second-century tomb at Rome, aged three, along with her father, Lucius Spedius Romulus, in a tomb dedicated by her mother, Flavia Vitalis.
- Spedia Materna, dedicated a second-century family sepulchre at Singidunum in Moesia Superior for her husband, Titus Flavius Victorinus, winner of the mural crown, and her children, Titus Flavius Victorianus and Flavia Victorina.
- Spedius Maternianus, dedicated a tomb at Tarraco in Hispania Citerior for his wife, Veneris Latinilla.
- Spedia Maximina, dedicated a tomb at Lacum Mephiticum to her patron, Gaius Spedius Felix.
- Quintus Spedius Mercator, dedicated a tomb at Altinum for Gaius Turellius Rufus, a native of Sardinia, aged forty-five years and twenty-five days. (Note: The inscription actually says "months", rather than days, followed by an extraneous 'A'. Presumably the engraver was distracted, and either skipped the number of months, or wrote "months" instead of "days".)
- Lucius Spedius L. L. l. Mithridas, a freedman buried at Rome.
- Lucius Spedius Ɔ. l. Musicus, a freeman, dedicated a tomb at Rome for his wife, the freedwoman Vedia Litens, dating from the second century, or the latter half of the first.
- Spedia Nice, buried at Luceria in Apulia, aged thirty years, six months, and twenty days, in a second-century tomb dedicated by her husband, Marcus Titius Primitivus.
- Spedia Optata, along with Spedia Felicia, dedicated a second-century tomb at Antinum to Publius Spedius, the quattuorvir.
- Lucius Spedius L. l. Pamphilus, a freedman buried in a tomb at Casilinum, dating from the late first century BC, or early first century AD, built by Spedia Laudica for herself and her son.
- Spedia Pannycis, buried at Ravenna, with a tomb dedicated by her husband, Publius Cassius Verus.
- Spedius Paulinus, buried at Narona, aged nine, with a monument from his mother, Spedia Marcelina, dating to the third century, or the latter half of the second.
- Gaius Spedius Pidinus, a soldier who dedicated a second- or third-century monument at Misenum in Campania for Justitia, aged thirty-three.
- Spedia Prisca, a freedwoman who dedicated a tomb at Ravenna to her stepson of eleven years, whose name has not been preserved.
- Spedia Prisca, along with her sons, Aelius Stasimus and Aelius Primianus, dedicated a tomb at Rome, dating from the reign of Hadrian, for her husband of fourteen years, Publius Aelius Primus, a freedman of the emperor, aged forty-seven years, five months, and twenty-one days.
- Spedia Priscilla, buried in a first-century tomb at Rome, dedicated by her husband, Valerianus, a freedman of the emperor.
- Spedia Procula, dedicated a sepulchre at Narona, dating to the third century, or the latter half of the second, for her husband, Valerius Taurus, and daughter, Valeria Pia, aged twelve.
- Lucius Spedius Quadratus, made an offering to Sol at Rome.
- Spedia T. f. Quarta, named in an inscription from Atria.
- Lucius Spedius Rhodinus, named in a first-century inscription from Interpromium in Samnium.
- Lucius Spedius Romulus, buried at Rome, aged twenty-one, along with his daughter, Spedia Marcia, in a second-century tomb dedicated by his wife, Flavia Marcia.
- Spedia L. l. Salvia, a freedwoman buried at Rome, along with Lucius Spedius Salvius.
- Lucius Spedius L. l. Salvius, a freedman buried at Rome, along with Spedia Salvia.
- Spedia L. f. Secunda, buried at Atria.
- Spedia L. l. Secunda, a freedwoman named in an inscription from Atria.
- Spedius Secundus, named in an inscription from Rome.
- Lucius Spedius Secundus, buried at Ameria in Umbria, in a tomb dedicated by Orbia Secunda.
- Spedius Severianus, dedicated a third-century tomb at Aeclanum to his wife, Auguria.
- Lucius Spedius L. f. Severus, a native of Florentia in Etruria, and a soldier in the seventh cohort of the Praetorian Guard, serving in the century of Maximinus, was buried at Rome between AD 130 and 170, in a tomb dedicated by Gaius Vibius Super, a member of the same maniple.
- Publius Spedius Successus, buried at Rome, along with his daughter, Spedia Fortunata, in a tomb dedicated by his wife, Artemas.
- Spedia Tyche, buried at Puteoli in campania, in a tomb dedicated by Gaius Julius, dating between AD 70 and 150.
- Gaius Spedius Valerianus, decurion of the collegium fabrum at Apulum in Dacia, during the second century, made an offering to Sol Invictus and Mithras at Sarmizegethusa.
- Gaius Spedius Victor, named in a third-century inscription from Sarmizegethusa.

== See also ==
- List of Roman gentes

== Bibliography ==
- Theodor Mommsen et alii, Corpus Inscriptionum Latinarum (The Body of Latin Inscriptions, abbreviated CIL), Berlin-Brandenburgische Akademie der Wissenschaften (1853–present).
- Supplementa Italica (Supplement for Italy), Unione Accademica Nazionale.
- Wilhelm Henzen, Ephemeris Epigraphica: Corporis Inscriptionum Latinarum Supplementum (Journal of Inscriptions: Supplement to the Corpus Inscriptionum Latinarum, abbreviated EE), Institute of Roman Archaeology, Rome (1872–1913).
- René Cagnat et alii, L'Année épigraphique (The Year in Epigraphy, abbreviated AE), Presses Universitaires de France (1888–present).
- Inscriptions Grecques et Latines de la Syrie (Greek and Latin Inscriptions of Syria, abbreviated IGLS), Paris (1929–present).
- Inscriptiones Italiae (Inscriptions from Italy), Rome (1931–present).
- Hilding Thylander, Inscriptions du port d'Ostie (Inscriptions from the Port of Ostia, abbreviated IPOstie), Acta Instituti Romani Regni Sueciae, Lund (1952).
- Bruna Forlati Tamaro, "Inscrizioni Inedite di Adria" (Unedited Inscriptions from Adria, abbreviated "IIAdria"), in Epigraphica, vol. 18, pp. 50–76 (1956).
- Tyche, Beiträge zur Alten Geschichte, Papyrologie und Epigraphik (Contributions to Ancient History, Papyrology, and Epigraphy), University of Vienna (1986–present).
- Athenasios D. Rizakis, Achaïe II. La cité de Patras: Épigraphie et histoire (Achaia II. The City of Patras: Epigraphy and History), Athens (1998).
