= Iteia gens =

Ancient Roman family

The gens Iteia or Itia was an obscure plebeian family at ancient Rome. No members of this gens are mentioned by ancient writers, but several are known from inscriptions. Perhaps the most illustrious of the family was Iteius Rufus, legate of Thracia during the reign of Hadrian.

== Origin ==
Several inscriptions of this gens are from Casilinum in Campania, while others are from Larinum in Samnium, suggesting an Oscan origin. The nomen Iteius appears to belong to a class of gentilicia formed using the suffix -eius, which was typical of Oscan names.

== Praenomina ==
The main praenomina of the Iteii were Quintus, Gaius, and Marcus, all of which were among the most common names throughout Roman history. Other praenomina are found in early inscriptions, including Decimus, Gnaeus, Lucius, and Publius. Of these, Decimus was relatively uncommon in the time of the Republic, but became more widespread in the imperial era.

== Members ==
This list includes abbreviated praenomina. For an explanation of this practice, see filiation.

- Lucius Itius or Iteius, a moneyer who issued denarii in 149 BC. His coins depict a head of Roma on the obverse, and the Dioscuri on the reverse.
- Decimus Iteius Cn. l., a freedman at Casilinum in Campania, named in an inscription dating from 106 BC.
- Gaius Iteius C. l. Stabilio, a freedman at Casilinum during the first century BC.
- Iteia P. l. Moschis, a freedwoman who built a sepulchre at Casilinum for herself and several other freedmen, dating to the late first century BC, or the early first century AD.
- Quintus Itius Q. f., buried at Larinum in Samnium, in a sepulchre built by his freedman, Quintus Itius, for himself, his patron, Itia Sympherusa, Quintus Itius Celadus, and Gnaeus Maius.
- Quintus Itius Q. l., the freedman and client of Quintus Itius, dedicated a sepulchre at Larinum for himself, his patron, Itia Sympherusa, Quintus Itius Celadus, and Gnaeus Maius.
- Itia Sympherusa, probably a freedwoman, was buried at Larinum in a sepulchre built by the freedman Quintus Itius for himself, his patron, Sympherusa, Quintus Itius Celadus, and Gnaeus Maius.
- Quintus Itius Celadus, probably a freedman, was buried at Larinum in a sepulchre built by the freedman Quintus Itius for himself, his patron, Itia Sympherusa, Celadus, and Gnaeus Maius.
- Itia Q. f. Prisca, buried at Rome during the first century, with a monument from the freedwoman Urbana.
- Gaius Itius C. l. Priscus, one of the Seviri Augustales at Sentinum in Umbria, during the first or second century.
- Iteius or Itius Rufus, legate of Thracia during the reign of Hadrian.
- Marcus Iteius M. f. Justus, buried at Casilinum between the middle of the second century, and the middle of the third.
- Marcus Itius, dedicated a tomb at Rome for his wife.
- Itius, a potter whose maker's mark is found on pottery from Gallia Aquitania, Lugdunensis, and Raetia.

== See also ==
- List of Roman gentes

== Bibliography ==
- Theodor Mommsen et alii, Corpus Inscriptionum Latinarum (The Body of Latin Inscriptions, abbreviated CIL), Berlin-Brandenburgische Akademie der Wissenschaften (1853–present).
- George Davis Chase, "The Origin of Roman Praenomina", in Harvard Studies in Classical Philology, vol. VIII, pp. 103–184 (1897).
- Paul von Rohden, Elimar Klebs, & Hermann Dessau, Prosopographia Imperii Romani (The Prosopography of the Roman Empire, abbreviated PIR), Berlin (1898).
- La Carte Archéologique de la Gaule (Archaeological Map of Gaul, abbreviated CAG), Académie des Inscriptions et Belles-Lettres (1931–present).
- Michael Crawford, Roman Republican Coinage, Cambridge University Press (1974, 2001).
- Heikki Solin, "Nuove iszrizioni di Capua" (New Inscriptions from Capua, part 3), in Oebalus, No. 6, pp. 119–129 (2011).
