= Frentani =

Ancient Italian people

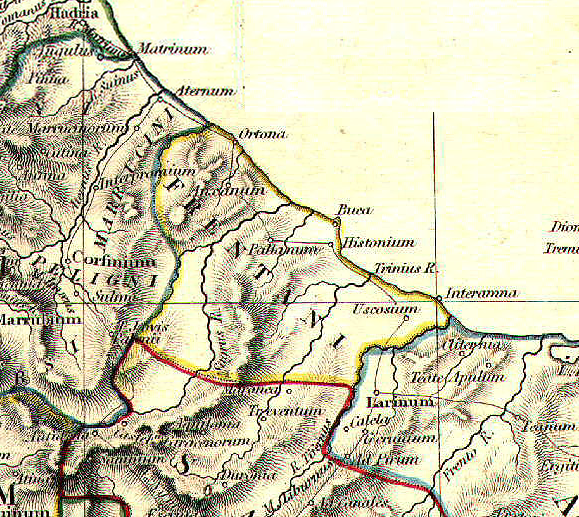
The territory of the Frentani according to the Historical Atlas, just north to the Samnium.

The Frentani were an Italic tribe occupying the tract on the southeast coast of the Italian Peninsula from the Apennines to the Adriatic, and from the frontiers of Apulia to those of the Marrucini. They were bounded on the west by the Samnites, with whom they were closely connected, and from whom they were originally descended. Hence Scylax assigns the whole of this line of coast, from the frontiers of Apulia to those of Picenum, to the Samnites. Their exact limits are less clearly defined, and there is considerable discrepancy in the statements of ancient geographers: Larinum, with its territory (extending from the Tifernus (modern Biferno) to the Frento), being by some writers termed a city of the Frentani, while the more general opinion included it in Apulia, and thus made the river Tifernus the limit of the two countries. The northern boundary of the Frentani is equally uncertain; both Strabo and Ptolemy concur in fixing it at the river Sagrus (modern Sangro), while Pliny extends their limits as far as the Aternus, and, according to Mela, they possessed the mouths both of that river and the Matrinus. The latter statement is certainly inaccurate; and Strabo distinctly tells us that the Marrucini held the right bank of the Aternus down to its mouth, while the Vestini possessed the left bank; hence, the former people must have intervened between the Frentani and the mouth of the Aternus. Pliny's account is, however, nearer the truth than that of Strabo and Ptolemy; for it is certain that Ortona and Anxanum (modern Lanciano), both of which are situated considerably to the north of the Sagrus, were Frentanian cities. The latter is indeed assigned by Ptolemy to that people, while Strabo also terms Ortona the port or naval station of the Frentani, but erroneously places it to the south of the river Sagrus. Hence, their confines must have approached within a few miles of the Aternus, though without actually abutting upon that river. On the west, they were probably not separated from the Samnites by any well-marked natural boundary, but occupied the lower slopes of the Apennines as well as the hilly country extending from thence to the sea, while the more lofty and central ridges of the mountains were included in Samnium.

== Affiliations and history ==
The Frentani are expressly termed by Strabo as a Samnite people, and he appears to distinguish them as such from the neighbouring tribes of the Marrucini, Peligni, Marsi, and Vestini, with whom they had otherwise much in common. They, however, appear in history as a separate people, having their own national organisation; and though they may at one time have constituted one of the four nations of the Samnite confederacy, this seems to have been no longer the case when that power came into collision with Rome. Their conduct during the long struggle between the Samnites and Romans renders this almost certain. In 319 BC, indeed, when their name occurs for the first time in history, they appear in arms against Rome, but were quickly defeated and reduced to submission; and a few years afterwards (304 BC), at the close of the Second Samnite War, the Frentani are mentioned, together with the Marsi, Marrucini, and Peligni, as coming forward voluntarily to sue for a treaty of alliance with Rome, which they seem to have subsequently adhered to with steadfastness. Hence we find more than once express mention of the Frentanian auxiliaries in the war with Pyrrhus; and one of their officers, by the name of Oblacus Volsinius, distinguished himself at the battle of Heraclea. They gave a still more striking proof of fidelity during the Second Punic War, by adhering to the Roman cause after the battle of Cannae, when so many of the Italian allies, including the greater part of the Samnites, went over to Hannibal.

Throughout this period they appear to have been much more closely connected in their political relations with their neighbours the Marrucini, Peligni, and Vestini, than with their Samnite kinsmen: hence, probably, it is that Polybius, in enumerating the forces of the Italian allies, classes the Frentani with the Marsi, Marrucini, and Vestini, while he reckons the Samnites separately. Notwithstanding their vaunted fidelity, the Frentani joined in the general outbreak of the Italian allies in the great Social War, 90 BC: they do not, however, appear to have taken any prominent part, and we can only infer that they received the Roman franchise at the same time as the neighbouring tribes. Hence they are mentioned by Cicero, a few years later, as sending some of their chief men to support the cause of Cluentius, a native of Larinum. Their territory was traversed without resistance by Julius Caesar at the outbreak of the Civil War, 49 BC, and this is the last occasion on which their name appears in history. Their territory was formed into the fourth region of Augustus, together with that of the Marrucini, Peligni, Marsi, etc.; but at a later period it appears to have been reunited with Samnium, and was placed under the authority of the governor of that province.

== Geography ==
The territory of the Frentani is for the most part hilly, but fertile. It is traversed by numerous rivers, which have their sources in the more lofty mountains of Samnium, and flow through the land of the Frentani to the Adriatic: the principal of these, besides the Tifernus, which constituted the southern limit of their country, are the Trinius (modern Trigno), which, according to Pliny, had a good port at its mouth; and the Sagrus (Sangro), which enters the Adriatic about halfway between Histonium (modern Vasto) and Ortona.

The Tabula Peutingeriana also gives the name of a river that it places between Ortona and Anxanum, calling it Clotoris. The name is probably corrupt; but the stream meant (if its position can be depended upon) could be the Moro, which falls into the Adriatic a few kilometers south of Ortona. The coast-line of this part of the Adriatic presents few remarkable features, and no good natural harbors. The mouths of the rivers, and the two projecting points of Termoli (ancient Buca) and the Punta della Penna, afford the only places of anchorage.

=== Towns ===
The towns of the Frentani mentioned by ancient writers are few in number; but the topography of the district has been thrown into great confusion by the perverted zeal of certain local antiquarians, and by the reliance placed on inscriptions published by some early writers, which there is great reason to regard as forgeries. The Antichità Frentane (1809) by Domenico Romanelli, who was a native of this part of Italy, is a very uncritical performance; but the author was led astray principally by the inscriptions and other documents put forth by Polidoro, an Italian antiquary of the 18th century, who appears to have had no hesitation in forging, or at least corrupting and altering them in such a manner as to suit his purpose. Along the sea-coast (proceeding from north to south) were situated Ortona, Histonium, and Buca. The two former may be clearly fixed, Ortona retaining its ancient name, and the ruins of Histonium being still extant at Vasto, but there is considerable difficulty in determining the site of Buca, which may however be fixed with much probability at Termoli; the arguments that have led many writers to place it near Villa Santa Maria being based principally upon the spurious inscriptions just alluded to. The existence of a town called Interamna, supposed by Romanelli and Cramer to have occupied the site of Termoli, is derived only from the same apocryphal source; and, even were the inscription itself authentic, the Interamna there meant is probably the well-known town of the Praetutii. The only inland town of importance among the Frentani was Anxanum (Lanciano); but, besides this, Pliny mentions, in the interior of the country, the "Carentini supernates et infernates", and the Lanuenses; the former (apparently a corruption of Caretini or Carricini) and the latter are otherwise unknown, and the site of their towns cannot be fixed with any approach to certainty. On the other hand, the Tabula gives the name of a place called Pallanum of which no other mention occurs, but the site of which, according to Romanelli, is marked by extensive ruins at a place called Monte Pallano, about 5 km southwest of Atessa. The previous station given by the same authority is called Annum; a name probably corrupt, but the true reading for which is unknown. Uscosium, a place given in the Itinerary of Antoninus, which reckons it 15 miles from Histonium, on the road into Apulia, is fixed by this distance at a spot near the right bank of the little river Sinarca, about 9 km southwest of Termoli, but in the territory of Guglionesi, where considerable remains of an ancient town are said to exist

=== Roads ===
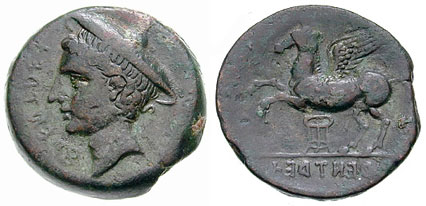
Coin from Frentrum with a head of Mercury and Pegasus.

There is considerable obscurity in regard to the Roman roads through the territory of the Frentani. The name of the Via Trajana Frentana rests only on the authority of a dubious inscription; nor is there any better evidence for the fact that the construction of the high road through this district was really owing to that emperor. But it is certain that an ancient road traversed the territory of the Frentani, in its whole length from Aternum to Larinum, keeping for the most part near the sea-coast, but diverging for the purpose of visiting Anxanum. The stations along it are thus given in the Itinerary of Antoninus:

- Ostia Aterni to Angulum (Angulus), x. M.P.
- Angulus to Ortona, xi. M.P.
- Ortona to Anxano, xiii. M.P.
- Anxano to Histonios, xxv. M.P.
- Histonios to Uscosio, xv. M.P.
- Uscosio to Arenio (Larinum ?), xiv. M.P.

Of these, Angulus or Angulum is certainly misplaced, possibly present day Città Sant'Angelo, and should have been inserted between Hadria (modern Atri) and the Aternus. The distance from the mouths of the Aternus at Pescara to Ortona is considerably understated, and that from Ortona to Anxanum as much overrated; but still the line of the road may be tolerably well made out, and an ancient Roman bridge, over the Sangro between Lanciano and Vasto, supplies a fixed point in confirmation.

The road given in the Tabula, on the contrary, strikes inland, from the mouth of the Aternus to Teate (modern Chieti), and thence to Ortona, and again between Anxanum and Histonium makes a bend inland by Annum and Pallanum. The distances given are very confused, and in many instances probably corrupt. They stand thus:

- Ostia Aterni to Teano Marrucino, xvi. M.P.
- Teano Marrucino to Ortona, xi. M.P.
- Ortona to Anxana, iii. M.P.
- Anxana to Annum, iiii. M.P.
- Annum to Pallanum, xii. M.P.
- Pallanum to Istonium, xxiii., M.P.
- Istonium to Larinum, "corrupt"

== Coinage ==
There exist copper coins with the Oscan legend "Frentrei", which may probably be referred to the Frentani rather than to the town of Ferentum in Apulia, to which they have been assigned by some writers. Others are of opinion that they indicate the existence of a city of the name of Frentrum as the capital of the Frentani, which is supposed to be the one referred to by Livy where he says "Frentanos vicit urbemque ipsam - in deditionem accepit", without naming the city.

The town Larinum issued coins of the 3rd century BC that bear a Latin legend "LARINOR(VM)".

== See also ==
- Ancient peoples of Italy
- List of ancient Italic peoples
