= Statius Albius Oppianicus =

1st century BC Ancient Roman nobleman

Statius Albius Oppianicus was a nobleman of the 1st century BCE notable for his role in some events described in Cicero's speech Pro Cluentio, and for the many crimes he was accused of. He was accused of having killed at least eight people, mostly his own family, for money.

In 74 BC, he was accused by his stepson, Aulus Cluentius Habitus, of having tried to poison him via two agents: Fabricius and Scamander, Fabricius's freedman, both of whom were convicted of their crime. After the agents' trials, Habitus went after Oppianicus, whom he accused of being the mastermind behind the plot. The trial garnered wide publicity, and was highly divisive in Roman society. He was convicted by a narrow margin, 17 voted for conviction and 15 voted against, with the majority of those voting against being non liquet ("it is not clear") votes rather than votes for outright acquittal. Habitus was accused of bribing jurors to convict, but modern scholars think it is likely that both sides bribed jurors.

Oppianicus died in 69 BCE, and shortly afterwards, Habitus was accused of poisoning him, the charge against which Cicero defended him in the speech Pro Cluentio of 66 BCE, which is the source for most of our information about Oppianicus.

According to Cicero in Pro Cluentio, Oppianicus

- poisoned Cluentia, his wife
- poisoned Gaius Oppianicus, his brother
- poisoned Auria, the pregnant wife of his brother
- fraudulently gained possession of the inheritance of his brother-in-law Numerius Magius by persuading his pregnant widow to abort her child who would otherwise have inherited the estate
- had a role in poisoning Dinaea -- by virtue of hiring an itinerant quack to provide care -- his mother-in-law
- forged and edited Dinaea's will to make his son Oppianicus her primary heir
- contrived the murder of Marcus Aurius
- orchestrated the killing by proscription of several of the witnesses to, and accusers of, his crimes
- murdered his children by past wives in order to remove obstacles to his marriage to Sassia, a wealthy widow who objected to their union on the grounds he had children by a past marriage
- attempted to poison Aulus Cluentius Habitus, Sassia's son, and Oppianicus's stepson
