= Fidiculania gens =

Ancient Roman family

The gens Fidiculania was a plebeian family at Rome. It is known chiefly from a single individual, Gaius Fidiculanius Falcula, a Roman senator, and one of the judices at the trial of Statius Albius Oppianicus in 74 BC. The general indignation at the verdict convicting Oppianicus led to accusations of irregularities against Fidiculanius, but he was acquitted. On subsequent occasions Cicero presented Fidiculanius in different lights, according to the needs of his clients.

== See also ==
- List of Roman gentes
