= Accius =

Accius was a Latin poet of the 16th century, to whom is attributed a paraphrase of Aesop's Fables, of which Julius Scaliger speaks with great praise.
