= Cesare Antonio Accius =

Italian engraver

Cesare Antonio Accius (or Accer) was an Italian engraver working in the early 17th century. According to William Young Ottley, writing in 1831, his work was known from a single print, showing a mountainous landscape, with a chapel, a large house and three figures, one of which is beating a drum. The artist signed it "Cesare Antoni Accius, fecit, inv. A.D. 1609.".

The Yale University Art Gallery has an impression of a print answering this description under the title Landscape with Men Stealing Waterfowl.

== Sources ==
- Bryan, Michael (1886). Robert Edmund Graves (ed.). Dictionary of Painters and Engravers, Biographical and Critical. Vol. II L-Z. London: George Bell and Sons. p. 4.
- Ottley, William Young (1831). "Caesar Antonius Accius". Notices of Engravers, and Their Works. London. p. 17.
