= Bruna Forlati Tamaro =

Italian archaeologist

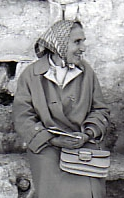
Bruna Forlati Tamaro

Bruna Forlati Tamaro (1894–1987) was an Italian archaeologist, classical scholar and museum curator. In the early 1960s, together with her husband Ferdinando Forlati, she participated in the Caesarea excavations in Israel. A member of several prestigious organizations, she initiated efforts directed at safeguarding Italy's archaeological heritage. In addition to publications on preservation, she examined and wrote extensively on archaeological inscriptions in Pula and southern Istria in Croatia. Forlati Tamaro supervised numerous national restoration projects in Veneto and the surrounding regions.

== Biography ==
Born on 31 March 1897 in Grumello del Monte, Bruna Tamaro was the daughter of a father from Piran in Slovenia and a mother from the Dompieri family in Trieste. As a result, she always felt closely attached to Istria. She studied at the universities of Bologna and Padua where she graduated in classics in 1915 with a dissertation on Lucretius. After the end of World War I, she continued her studies in Rome and Athens, focusing on archaeology.

From 1921, she was archaeological inspector in Venezia Giulia which included the peninsula of Istria. She undertook conservation work in Pula on the Temple of Augustus and on the ancient city walls. In 1929, she married Ferdinando Forlati who was responsible for monuments in the Trieste region. They had a son together. When her husband became Superintendent of Antiquities in Venice in 1936, Forlati Tamaro was appointed director of the Venice Archaeological Museum. From 1952 to 1961, she was Superintendent of Monuments in the greater Province of Padua region. In 1961, she participated in the excavations in Caesarea, which included the discovery of the Pilate stone.

Forlati Tamaro participated in Italy's most significant cultural heritage bodies and was a member of several major archaeological institutes including the German Archaeological Institute, the Italian Institute of Etruscan Studies and the Italian Institute of Prehistory and Protohistory. She was nominated a Commander of the Order of Merit of the Italian Republic (1986) and received several awards, including a gold medal from the city of Aquileia where she had organized outstanding excavation work.

Bruna Forlati Tamaro died in Venice on 13 February 1987.
