= Titus Accius =

1st-century BC Roman jurist

Titus Accius was a Roman jurist and knight.

Accius was a native of Pisaurum. In 66 BC he stood as prosecutor in the murder trial of Aulus Cluentius Habitus, accused of killing Oppianicus the elder with poison. Cicero was Cluentius's sole defender, and composed his famous speech Pro Cluentio for the occasion.

Accius was a pupil of Hermagoras of Temnos, and is praised by Cicero for his accuracy and fluency.
