= Auria gens =

Ancient Roman family

The gens Auria was a Roman family at Larinum in southern Italy, known chiefly from Cicero's oration, Pro Cluentio.

== Praenomina ==
The Aurii are known to have used the praenomina Marcus, Numerius, Aulus, and Gaius.

== Branches and cognomina of the gens ==
The only cognomen associated with this family is Melinus.

== Members of the gens ==
This list includes abbreviated praenomina. For an explanation of this practice, see filiation.

- Marcus Aurius, taken prisoner at the Battle of Asculum during the Social War, in 89 B.C., and subsequently murdered by Statius Albius Oppianicus.
- Numerius Aurius, predeceased his brother, Marcus.
- Auria, wife of Gaius Albius Oppianicus, murdered, together with her husband, by his brother, Statius.
- Aulus Aurius Melinus, threatened to prosecute Oppianicus, but later proscribed and put to death by him.
- Gaius Aurius A. f., proscribed and put to death by Oppianicus.
- Auria A. f., daughter-in-law of Oppianicus.

== See also ==
- List of Roman gentes
