= Aulus Cluentius Habitus =

Aulus Cluentius Habitus was a wealthy citizen of Larinum in Samnium, and subject of a Roman cause célèbre.

In 74 BC, he accused his stepfather Statius Albius Oppianicus of an attempt to poison him; had it been successful, the property of Cluentius would have fallen to his mother Sassia. Oppianicus was found guilty. It is almost certain that both sides attempted to bribe the jury. The case became notorious as an example of a prosecutor obtaining a guilty verdict through his money.

In 66 BC, Sassia induced her stepson Oppianicus to charge Cluentius with having poisoned the elder Oppianicus. The prosecutor in the trial was Titus Accius. The defense was undertaken by Cicero; his extant speech Pro Cluentio, written up after the trial, is regarded as a model of oratory and Latin prose. Cluentius was acquitted and Cicero subsequently boasted that he had thrown dust in the eyes of the jury "...se tenebras iudicibus offudisse in causa Cluenti gloriatus est". This was reported by Quintilian, Instit. ii. 17. 21, who quotes this speech more than any other.

== Pro Cluentio ==
The trial of 66 BC took place before the court of poisonings but the precise legal position is unclear. Most of Cicero's speech concerns the earlier trial and supposed prejudice surrounding it [the word "invidia" is constantly repeated]; Cicero claims this is strictly irrelevant to his case. He presents Oppianicus as a monster who killed many members of his own family, Sassia as a stock figure of female wickedness. He then declares that either Cluentius or Oppianicus bribed the earlier court; and having proven that Oppianicus did so, claims that Cluentius was innocent of bribery. The judges who voted for Oppianicus's condemnation did so because they thought he was not going to fulfil his promise to pay them. Cicero deals at length with earlier verdicts quoted against Cluentius, offers a fairly brief rebuttal of the charge of poisoning and finishes with a rousing peroration. Throughout, Cluentius is represented as a paragon of honesty and virtue; there is every reason to doubt this.
