= Flavio Bertelli =

Italian painter (1865–1941)

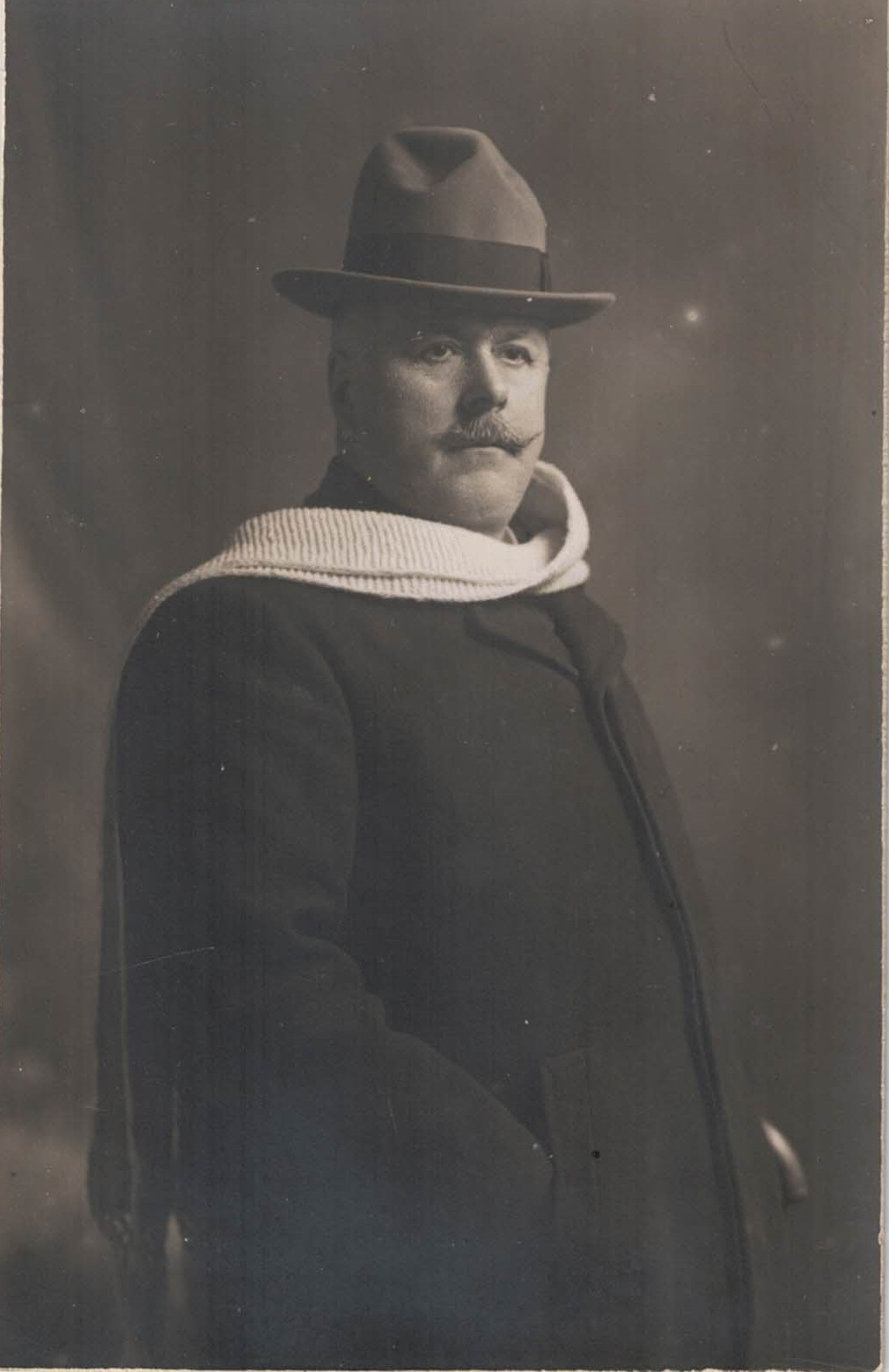
Photo of Flavio Bertelli

Flavio Bertelli (San Lazzaro di Savena, 15 August 1865 – Rimini, 29 December 1941) was an Italian painter.

Flavio Bertelli was among the few exponents of divisionism in the Bolognese area, in addition to Augusto Majani and Alessandro Scorzoni. Furthermore, he belongs to that group of landscape painters of the early 1900s of the "Bolognese School of Painting", such as Luigi Bertelli (Flavio's father), Antonino Sartini, Guglielmo Pizzirani, Giovanni Secchi, Alessandro Scorzoni and Gino Marzocchi, who painted the Emilia-Romagna landscapes, reproducing their beauties and witnessing, with the brush, the changes over time.

== Biography ==
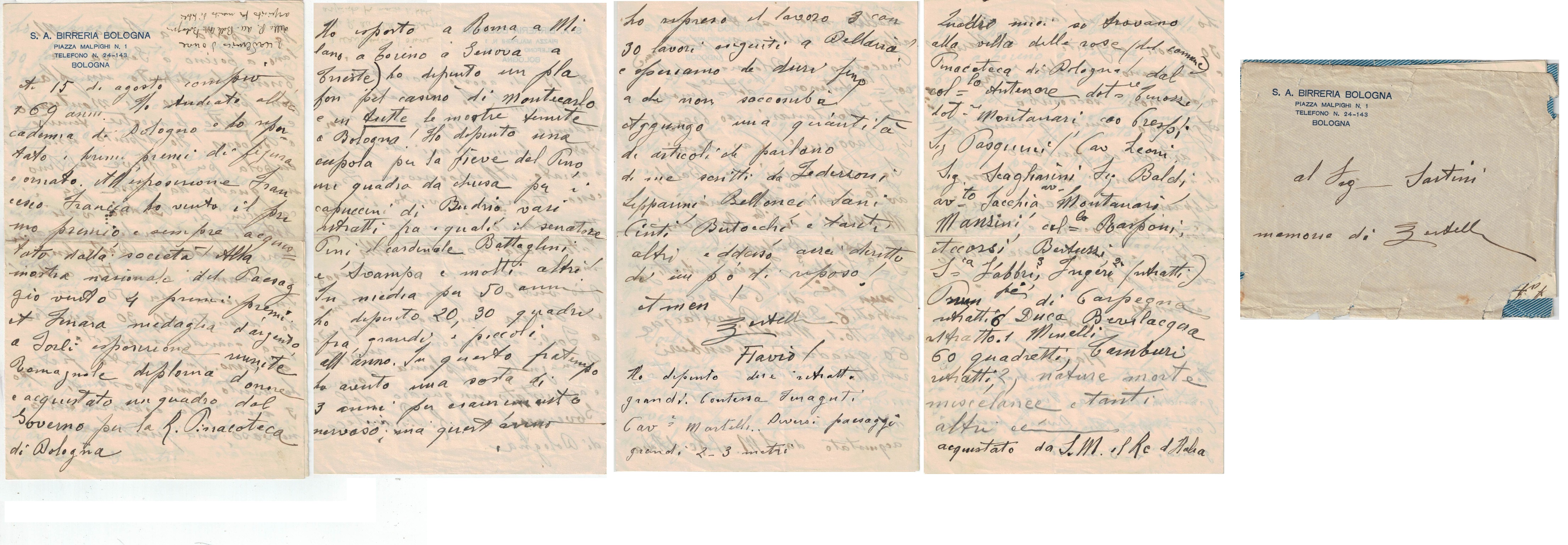
Memoirs of Flavio Bertelli, written in his own hand and sent to his friend Antonino Sartini in 1932.

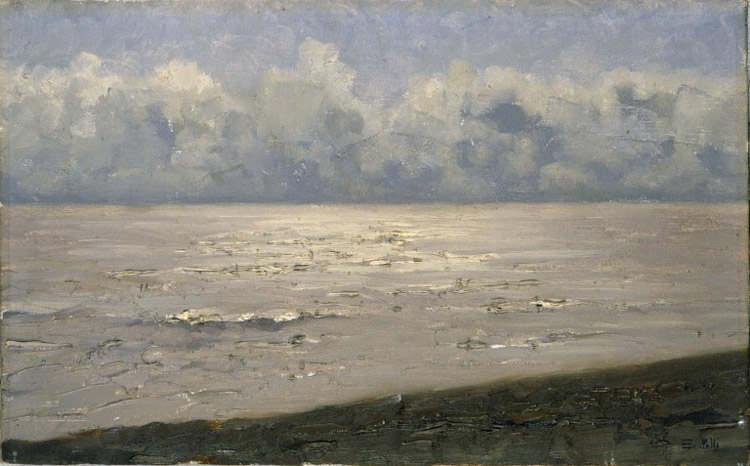
Marina (seascape), 1921, Pinacoteca comunale di Faenza (Municipal Art Gallery of Faenza).

Son of the painter Luigi Bertelli and Matilde Benetti, Flavio Bertelli was born in San Lazzaro di Savena in 1865. The family is wealthy and of a good cultural level: an uncle of Luigi Bertelli, Francesco Bertelli, is a professor of Astronomy at the University of Bologna; one of these sons, Timoteo Bertelli, is a Barnabite father of vast knowledge. He attended the college "Collegio di San Luigi" in Bologna and subsequently the college "Collegio Alle Querce" in Florence, also attending the lessons of Telemaco Signorini, gaining admiration and affection for the teacher. The latter was the painter who had met Manet and Degas personally, he was the most open mind of the whole Macchiaioli movement. Back in Bologna, in 1883 he enrolled at the Academy of Fine Arts where he remained for only one year, despite the victory of two medals.

In 1885 he abandoned his studies to devote himself to painting and at only twenty-three he participated in the National Exhibition of "Belle Arti" (fine Arts) in Bologna. In 1891 he exhibited the painting Nevicata (snowfall) at the first "Triennale di Brera" (triennial exhibition of Brera) and probably on this occasion he met Vittore Grubicy de Dragon with whom he shared the principles of divisionism. In that same year, following the failure of the family brickyard, Flavio is in a very difficult economic condition. Forced to leave the family home, he moves to an attic of Palazzo Bentivoglio in Bologna, where he later meets Alfredo Baruffi and becomes part of the cenacle of the "Giambardi della Sega", with whom he will share the brief experience of the "Academia (academy) de la Lira". He exhibited at the second "Triennale di Brera" (triennial exhibition of Brera) obtaining great success with critics and in 1895 he took part in the exhibition of the "Society of Francesco Francia", which he would continue to take part in until 1922.

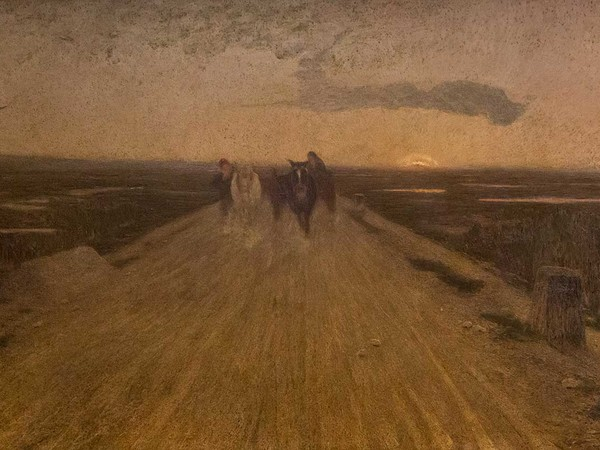
Sera, (Evening) 1898, oil on canvas, 150x300 cm, private collection.

In 1898 at the National Exhibition of Turin he presented the great pointillist painting Sera (evening). In 1900 he left Palazzo Bentivoglio to move his studio to via del Poggiale. In the same year he collaborated in the illustration of the magazine "Italia ride" (Italy laughs) and refused the important proposal of the publisher Giulio Ricordi to illustrate musical scores. In 1903 he took part in the LXII Exhibition of the Turin by Società Promotrice delle Belle Arti (Promoting Society of fine Arts) and in 1905 he took care of the decoration of the baptistery of the church of S. Ansano in Pieve del Pino (near Bologna). In 1909 he was appointed academic by the Accademia di Belle Arti di Bologna (Academy of Fine Arts of Bologna). In 1915 he finished the painting Oltre il Pincio, considered by critics to be his masterpiece, which cost him years of effort.

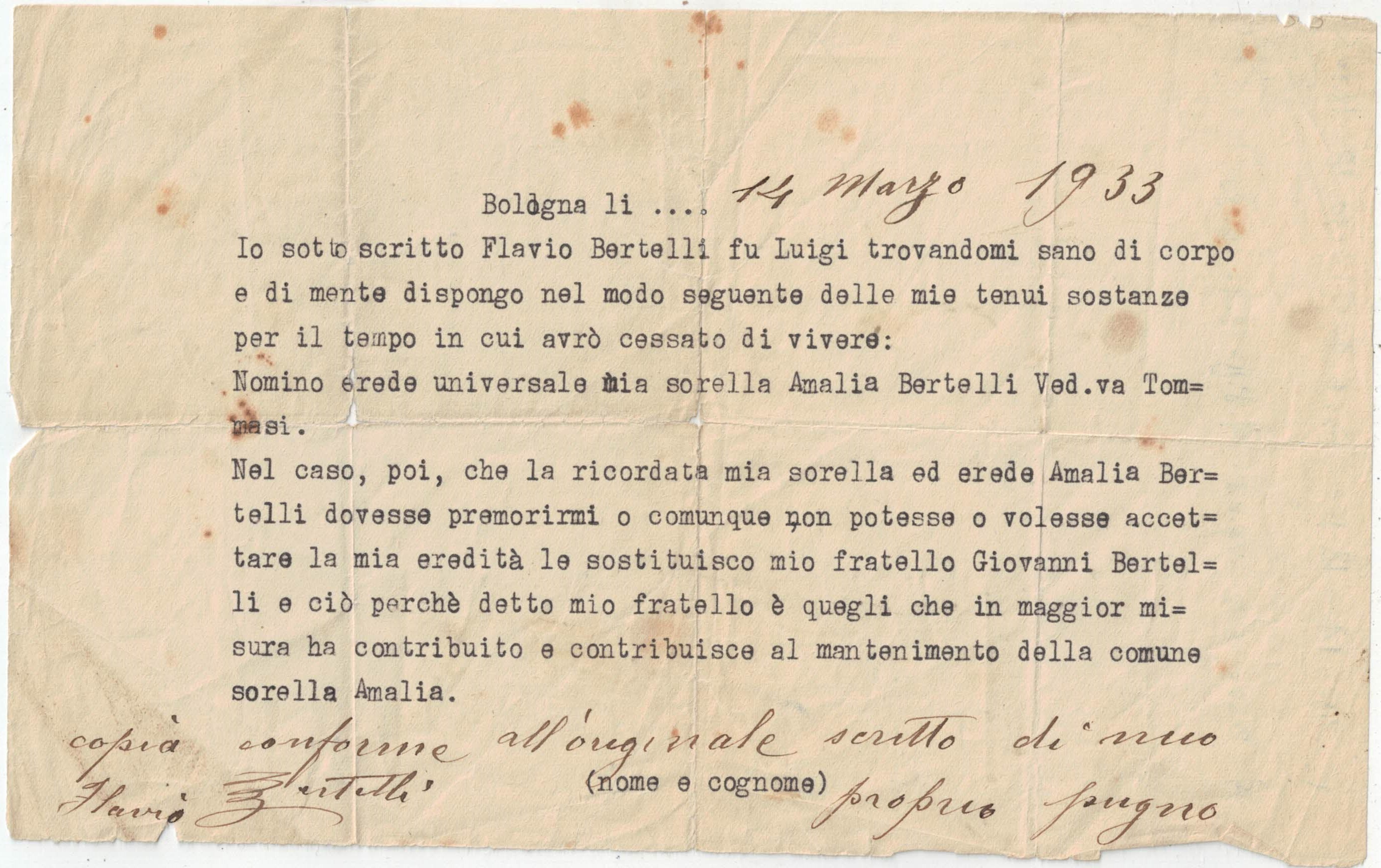
Authenticated copy of Flavio Bertelli's will in 1933.

His passion for divisionism comes to fruition and ends with the spiritual crisis of 1918. In fact, the strong depressive crisis will convince him to abandon the Divisionist technique which requires maximum concentration and long times. Bertelli recovers the post Macchiaioli painting learned in the Florentine years. In 1921 he participated in the 1st Roman Biennial exhibition and in the "Fiorentina primaverile". During the twenties Flavio made several trips between the Italian regions Romagna and the Marche: he stayed in Carpegna, in Montefeltro, in Monghidoro, Pennabilli, Modigliana, Gabicce and Cattolica. In these years he paints many works that he gives to his friends in exchange for hospitality. We know from them that Flavio was a kind and welcome guest: they remember him as a pleasant pianist, a lovable, cultured and reserved person.

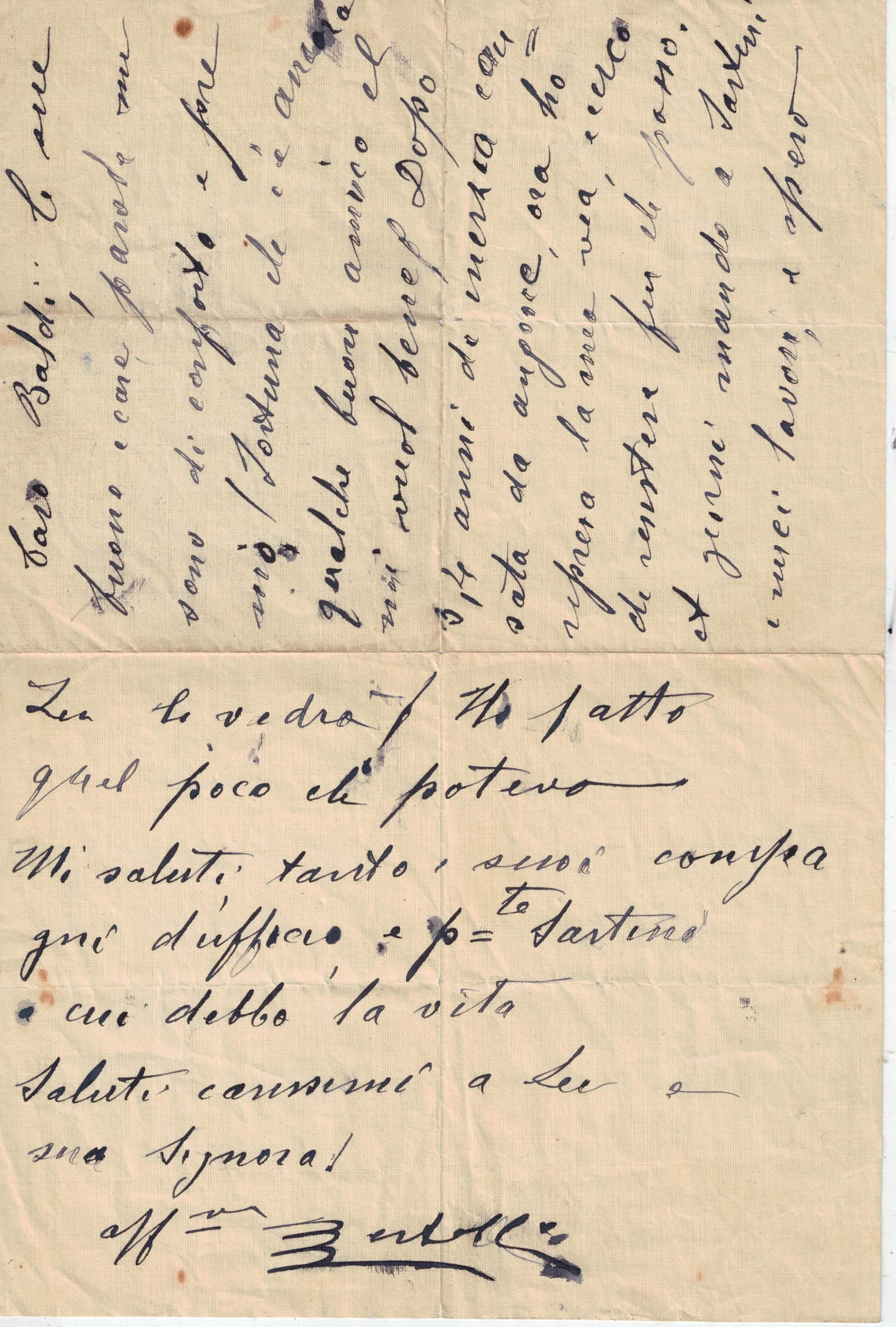
Letter from Flavio Bertelli to Baldi Alfredo (also a friend of Sartini), in which he expresses his gratitude towards Sartini.

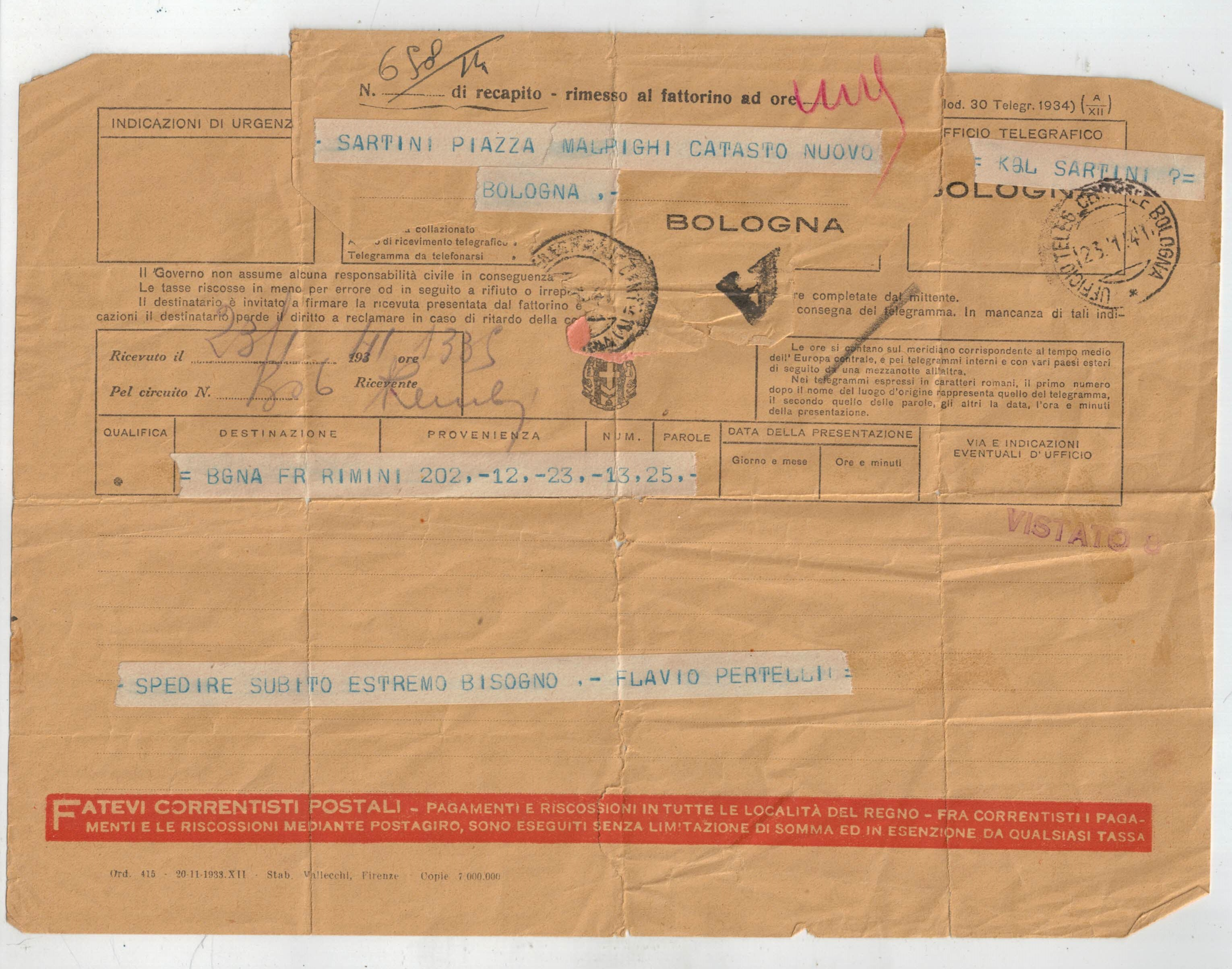
Telegram sent by Flavio Bertelli to his friend Antonino Sartini on 23 January 1941

In 1929 he was hit by a new very serious depressive crisis. Hospitalized in a private clinic, he is forced to leave prematurely because he is unable to pay the costs. He then leaves his studio in "via del Poggiale" and is first a guest in Crespellano by his friend and painter Antonino Sartini, who improvises himself as a merchant to sell him the paintings accumulated over many years and at the same time he convinces him to go back to painting. In 1933 he moved to Cagnona di Bellaria in a humble house with his sister Amalia. During these years he is supported by friends who provide him with the tools and deal with the sale of the paintings. Among these we find his friend and painter Antonino Sartini who continues to help and support him. However, there are others who from Bologna bring brushes, colors and other materials as gifts to the painter, to buy Bertelli's paintings at an extremely low price, leaving very little profit margin to the artist. On 29 December 1941, at the age of seventy-six, Bertelli died of a gastric neoplasm at the Rimini Hospital. He is buried in the monumental cemetery of the Certosa di Bologna. However, it is reported in the catalog of the Bertelli Flavio retrospective exhibition of 1952, 1981 and 1991 that: "Il Circolo Artistico di Bologna (The Artistic Circle of Bologna), in the decade of the artist's death, allocates a sum to transport the remains of Flavio Bertelli to Bologna. But arrives late: the bones of Flavio are now confused with those of other poor people in a mass grave in the Rimini Cemetery." In fact, the same Circolo Artistico di Bologna (Artistic Circle of Bologna) wrote in 1952 that: "It was intended to recover the remains of the body, buried in a common field of the cemetery of Rimini, before they were confused with others in the ossuary, and to give them perpetual distinction in our Certosa ... The intervention of the Club did not come in time to save the bones from dispersion."

== Style ==
Flavio Bertelli was one of the main representatives of Bolognese divisionism. Among the most significant pointillist works we remember: Paesaggio (Landscape) (1891), Sera (evening) (1898) and Oltre il Pincio (1915). The depressive crisis of 1918 was followed by the gradual abandonment of the pointillist technique in favor of the recovery of the stain painting learned in the Florentine years by Telemaco Signorini. In the Thirties the painting evaporates becoming less material and letting the support shine through without ever losing the lyricism typical of all his production.

== Works (dated) ==
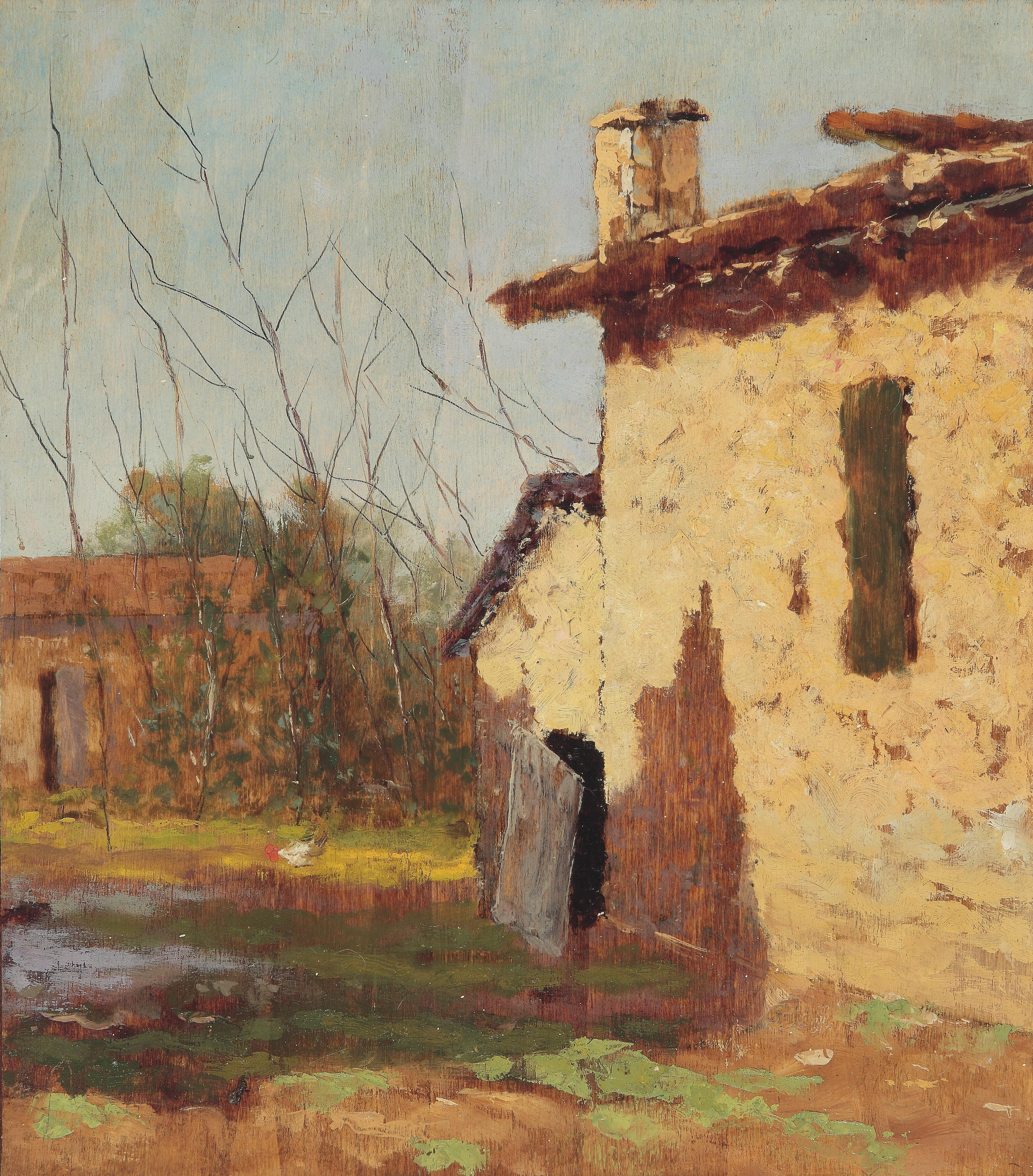
Casa al sole (House under the sun), 1938

- Ritratto ovale di giovane donna, (Oval portrait of a young woman), about 1885, oil on canvas pasted on cardboard, 19x16 cm, private collection.
- Appennino (Apennines) (pointillist style), 1891, oil on panel, 17.5x32.5 cm, private collection.
- Appennino (Apennines) (Macchiaioli style), 1891, oil on panel, private collection.
- Paesaggio (Landscape) (pointillist style), 1891, oil on panel, 17.5x32.5 cm, private collection.
- Paesaggio (Landscape) (Macchiaioli style), about 1891, oil on panel, 29x44 cm, private collection.
- Il tramonto e l'alba, (The sunset and the dawn), 1895, oil on canvas, 130x205 cm, MAMbo – Museum of Modern Art of Bologna.
- Ultimo bacio di sole morente, (Last kiss of the dying sun), 1897, oil on canvas, 65x44.5 cm, private collection.
- Sera, (Evening) 1898, oil on canvas, 150x300 cm, private collection.
- Premilcore, 1907, oil on canvas, 40x57 cm, private collection.
- Ritratto di signora con sfondo di rose, (Portrait of a Lady with Roses Background), 1907, oil on oval cardboard, 22x16 cm, private collection.
- Bimba al sole, (little girl under the sun) 1910, oil on panel, 34x25.4 cm, private collection.
- Al pascolo, (At the pasture), around 1912, oil on canvas, 46x82.5 cm, private collection..
- Sottobosco, (Undergrowth) around 1912, oil on canvas, 75x118 cm, private collection.
- Il tacchino, (The turkey) 1915, oil on canvas, 24.5x52.5 cm, private collection.
- Oltre il Pincio, (Beyond the Pincio) 1915, oil on canvas, 63x77 cm, private collection.
- Solitudine, (Solitude) 1915, oil on canvas, 55.5x153.5 cm, private collection.
- Gabicce, 1918, oil on canvas, 67x44 cm, private collection.
- Gabicce, around 1918, oil on panel, 41.5x61 cm, private collection.
- La demolizione delle torri, (The demolition of the towers) 1918, oil on panel, 35x26 cm, private collection.
- Il pane delle anime, (The bread of souls) about 1918, oil on cardboard, 20.7x34 cm, Collections of Art and History of the Cassa di Risparmio Foundation in Bologna.
- Rupe di Gabicce, (Cliff of Gabicce) about 1918, oil on panel, 33.5x22 cm, private collection.
- A Premilcore, about 1920, oil on cardboard, 32.5x48.5 cm, private collection.
- Ciliegio in fiore, (Cherry tree in bloom) about 1920, oil on cardboard, 30.5x41.5 cm, private collection.
- Fioritura, (Flowering) about 1920, oil on cardboard, 19x27.5, collection tested.
- Il ponte della signora a Modigliana, (The bridge of the lady in Modigliana) around 1922, oil on cardboard, 29x42.5 cm, private collection
- Primavera, (Spring) circa 1922, oil on panel, 20x35 cm, private collection.
- Primo sole, (First sun) about 1922, oil on panel, 27x42 cm, private collection.
- Lungo il canale, (Along the canal) around 1922, oil on canvas, 48x71.5 cm, private collection.
- Autoritratto, (Self-portrait) 1923, oil on canvas, 42x28.5 cm, Collections of Art and History of the Cassa di Risparmio Foundation in Bologna.
- Tramonto invernale in Carpegna, (Winter sunset in Carpegna) 1923, oil on cardboard, 43.5x55 cm, private collection.
- La trecciaiola, about 1923, oil on cardboard, 33.5x24 cm, private collection.
- Signorina nel castagneto, (Young lady in the chestnut wood)1923, oil on canvas, 56x72 cm, private collection.
- Carpegna, 1924, oil on plywood, 29.5x44.5 cm, private collection.
- Il bottaccio, 1924, oil on canvas, 60x95 cm, MAMbo – Museum of Modern Art of Bologna.
- Paesaggio della Carpegna, (Landscape of the Carpegna) 1925, oil on panel, 39.5x29.5 cm, private collection.
- I gelsi, (Mulberries) 1925, oil on panel, 24.5x38 cm, private collection.
- Sul Marecchia (Pennabilli), 1925, oil on canvas, 100x50 cm, private collection..
- Miscellanea, 1926, oil on panel, 21.5x32.5 cm, private collection.
- Carpegna, 1926, oil on canvas, 54.5x85 cm, private collection.
- Il canale, (The canal) 1926, oil on canvas, 55x85 cm, private collection.
- Orfana di guerra, (War orphan) 1926, oil on canvas, 29x44 cm, private collection.
- Alba d'autunno, (Autumn dawn) about 1928, oil on cardboard, 19x27.5 cm, private collection.
- La tagliata, about 1928, oil on canvas, 32.2 x50.7 cm, private collection.
- Paesaggio, (Landscape) 1930, oil on canvas, 28x28 cm, MAMbo – Museum of Modern Art of Bologna.
- Papaveri, (Poppies) 1930, oil on cardboard, 26.5x41 cm, private collection.
- Dopo la pioggia, (After the rain) 1930, oil on panel, 49x79 cm, private collection.
- Bellaria, 1933, oil on plywood, 30x39.5 cm, private collection.
- Ritratto di bambina, (Portrait of a girl) circa 1934, oil on plywood, 39x31 cm, private collection.
- Dicembre, (December) 1935, oil on panel, 29.9x44.8 cm, private collection.
- L'umile capanno del pescatore, (The humble fisherman's hut) 1935, oil on plywood, 50x60 cm, private collection.
- Nel silenzio della sera, (In the silence of the evening) 1935, oil on plywood, 49x60 cm, private collection.
- Alba, (Dawn) 1936, oil on panel, 46x36 cm, private collection.
- La celletta, (Small cell) 1936, oil on plywood, 50.5x39.5 cm, private collection.
- Autoritratto, (Self-portrait) 1937, oil on plywood, 49.5x35 cm, private collection.
- Andata al fonte, 1938, oil on plywood, 39.5x32 cm, private collection.
- La calma della sera, (The calm of the evening) 1938, oil on panel, 39x17.5 cm, private collection.
- Fiori di pesco, (Peach blossoms) 1939, oil on plywood, 40x60 cm, private collection.
- Lungo la ferrovia, (Along the railway) 1939, oil on panel, 48x32 cm, private collection.

== Works (undated) ==
- Notturno, (Nocturne) oil on panel, 26x47 cm, private collection.
- La lavandaia, (The washerwoman) oil on canvas, 30x49 cm, private collection.
- Paesaggio montano, (Mountain landscape) oil on panel, 23x32 cm, private collection.
- Casolare rustico, (Rustic cottage) oil on wood, 30x45 cm, private collection.

== Gallery ==
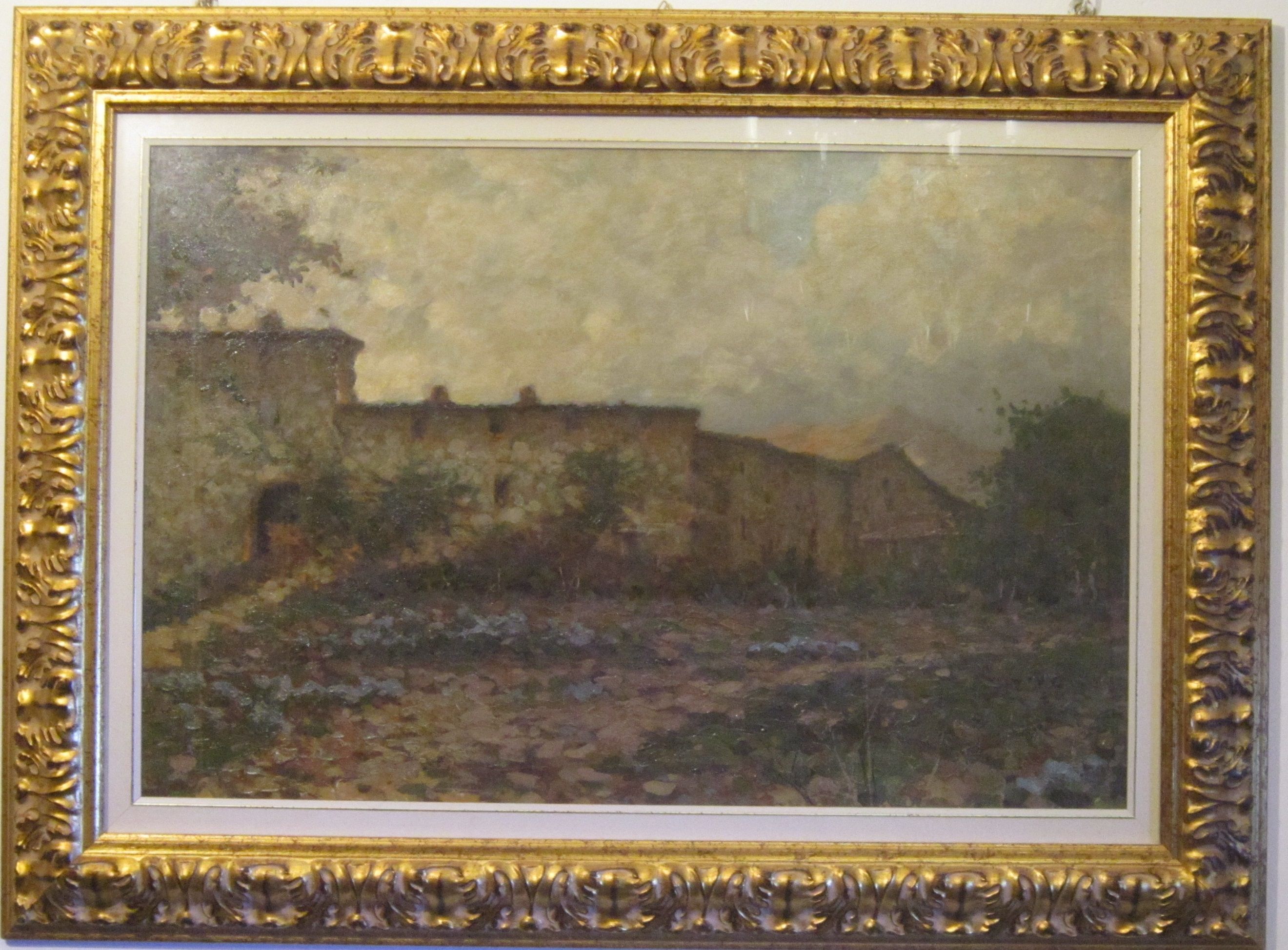
Dopo la pioggia, (After the rain) 1930, oil on panel, 49x79 cm, private collection.

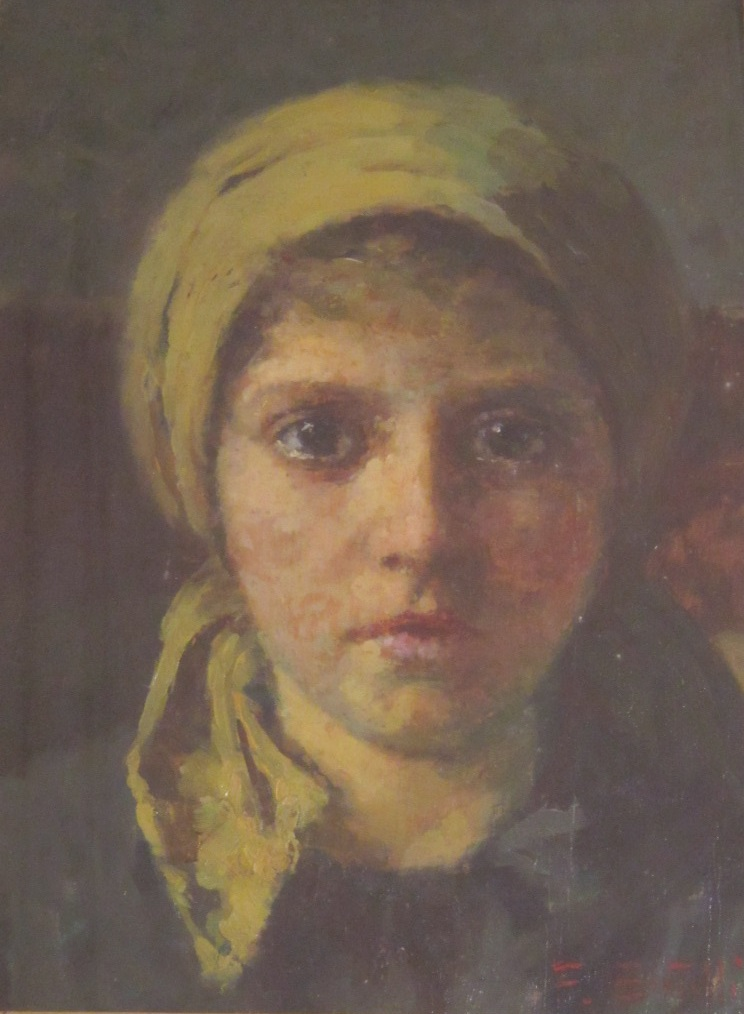
Orfana di guerra, (War orphan) 1926, oil on canvas, 29x44 cm, private collection.

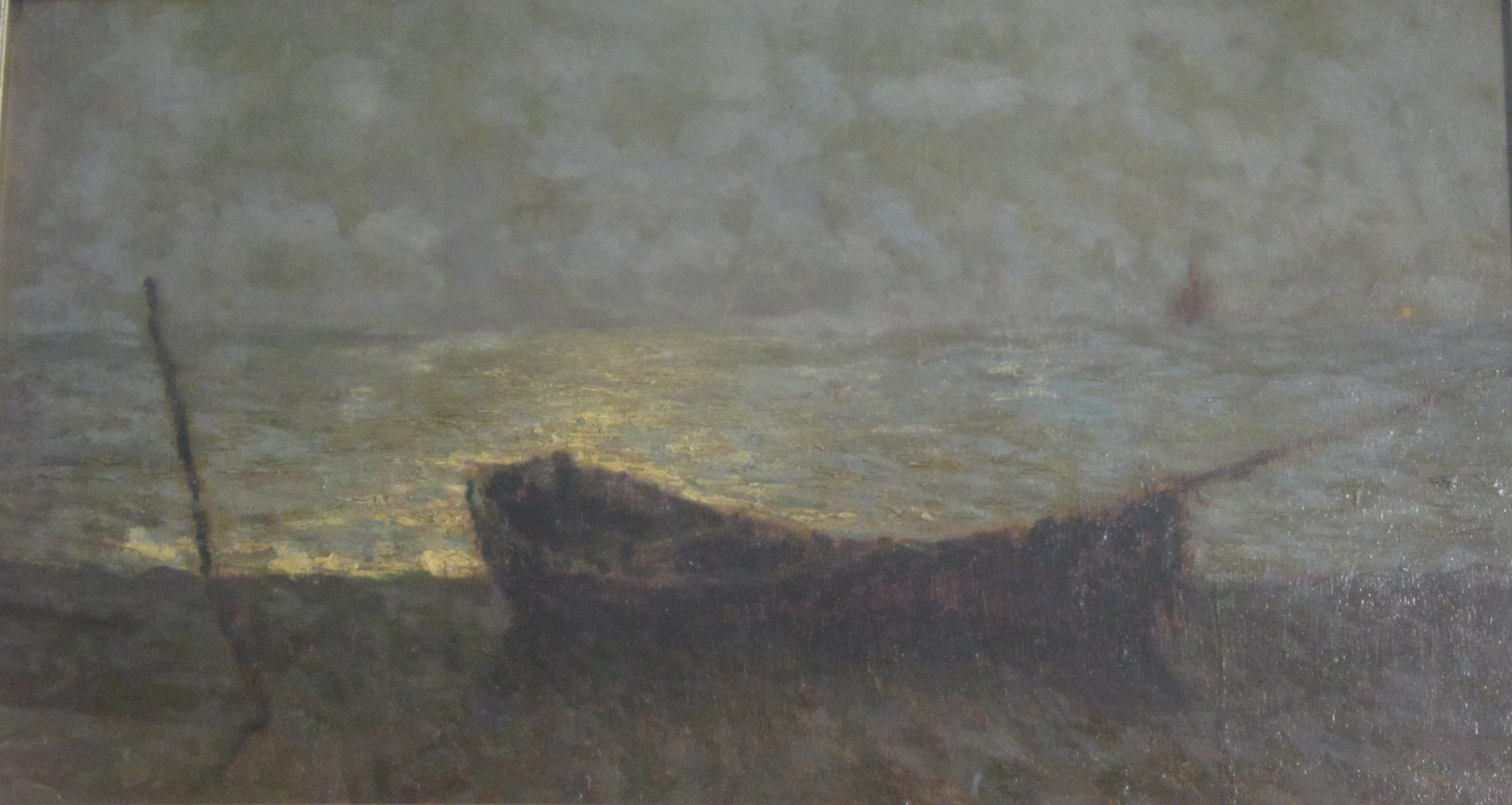
Notturno, (Nocturne) oil on panel, 26x47 cm, private collection.

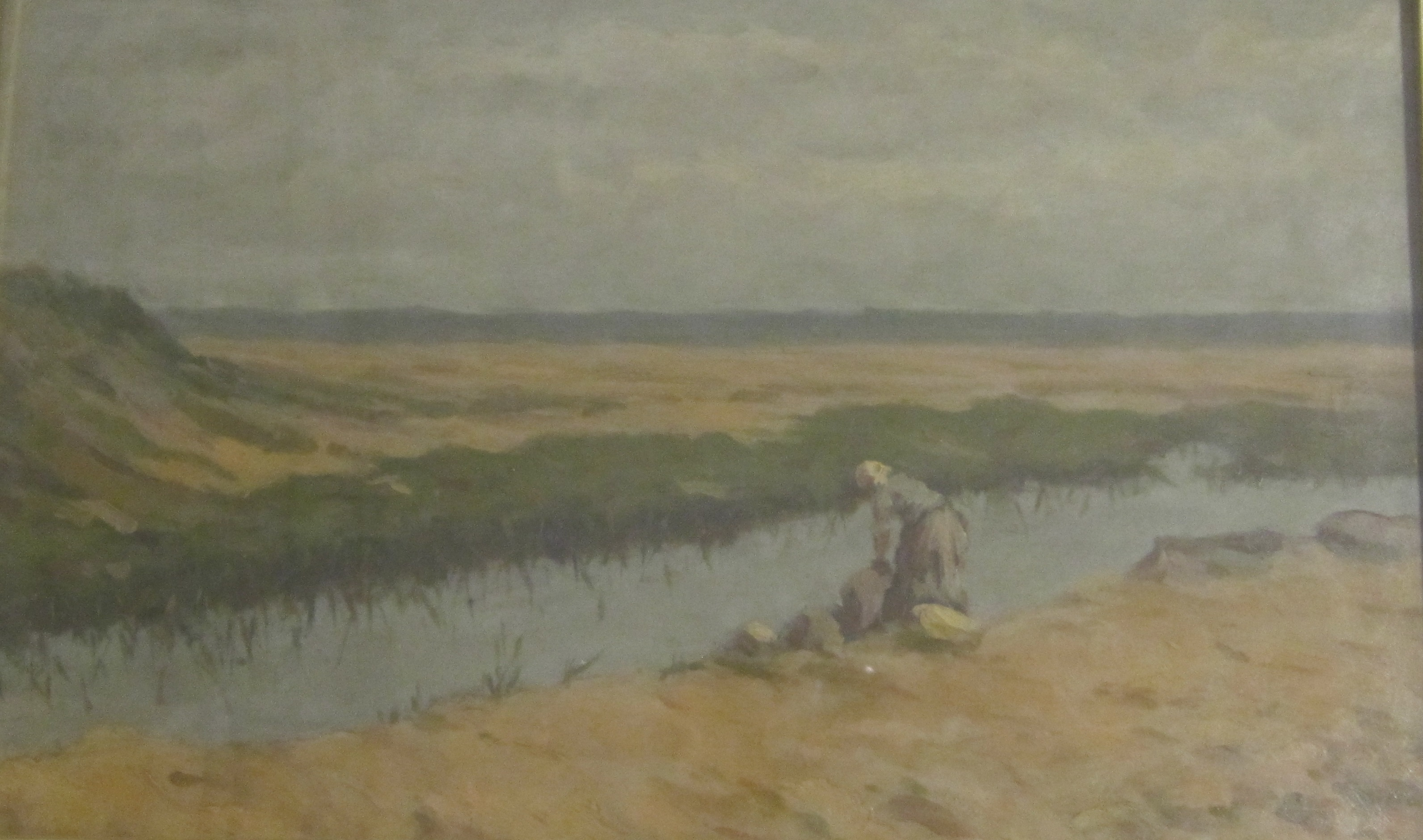
La lavandaia, (The washerwoman) oil on canvas, 30x49 cm, private collection.

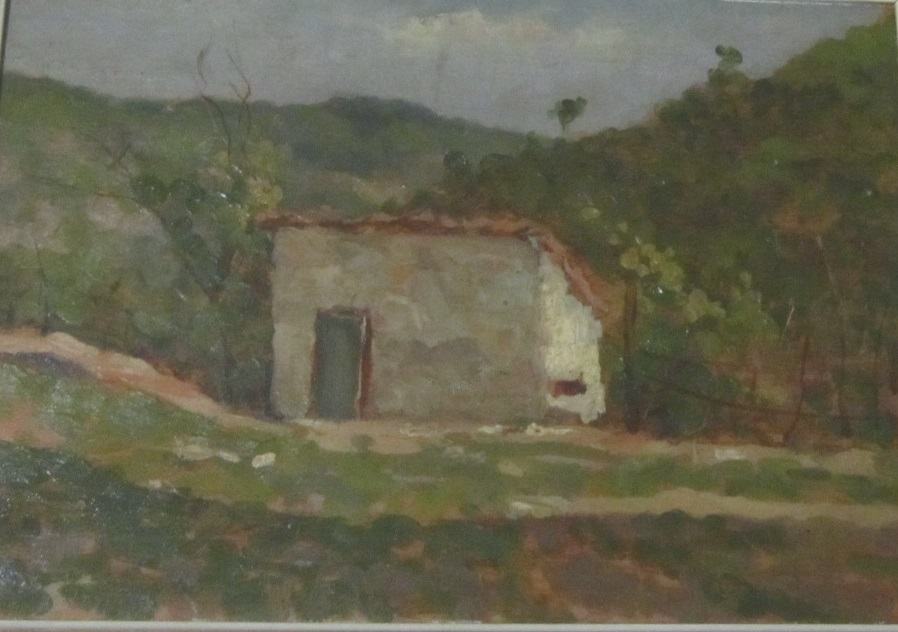
Paesaggio montano, (Mountain landscape) oil on panel, 23x32 cm, private collection.

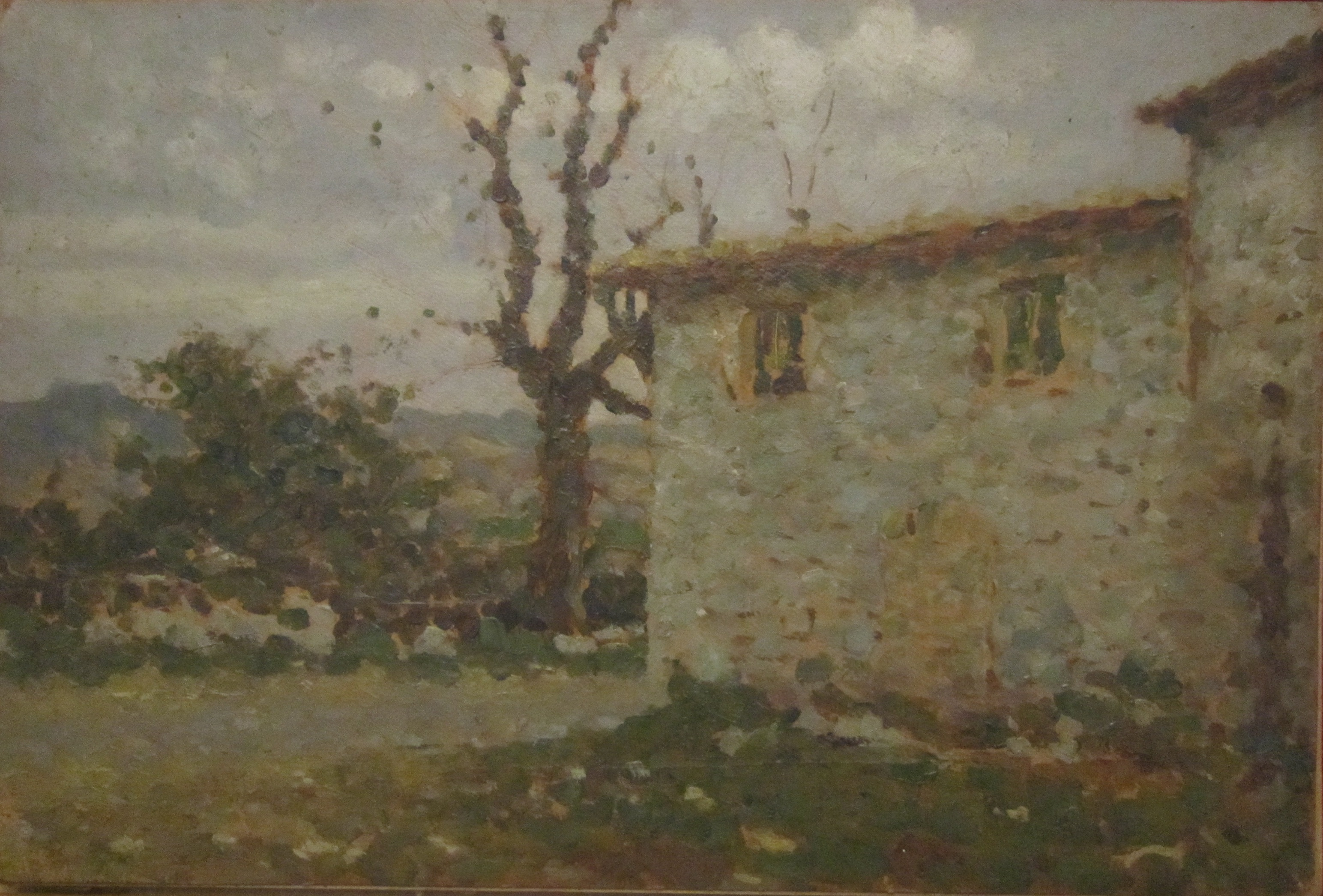
Casolare rustico, (Rustic cottage) oil on wood, 30x45 cm, private collection.

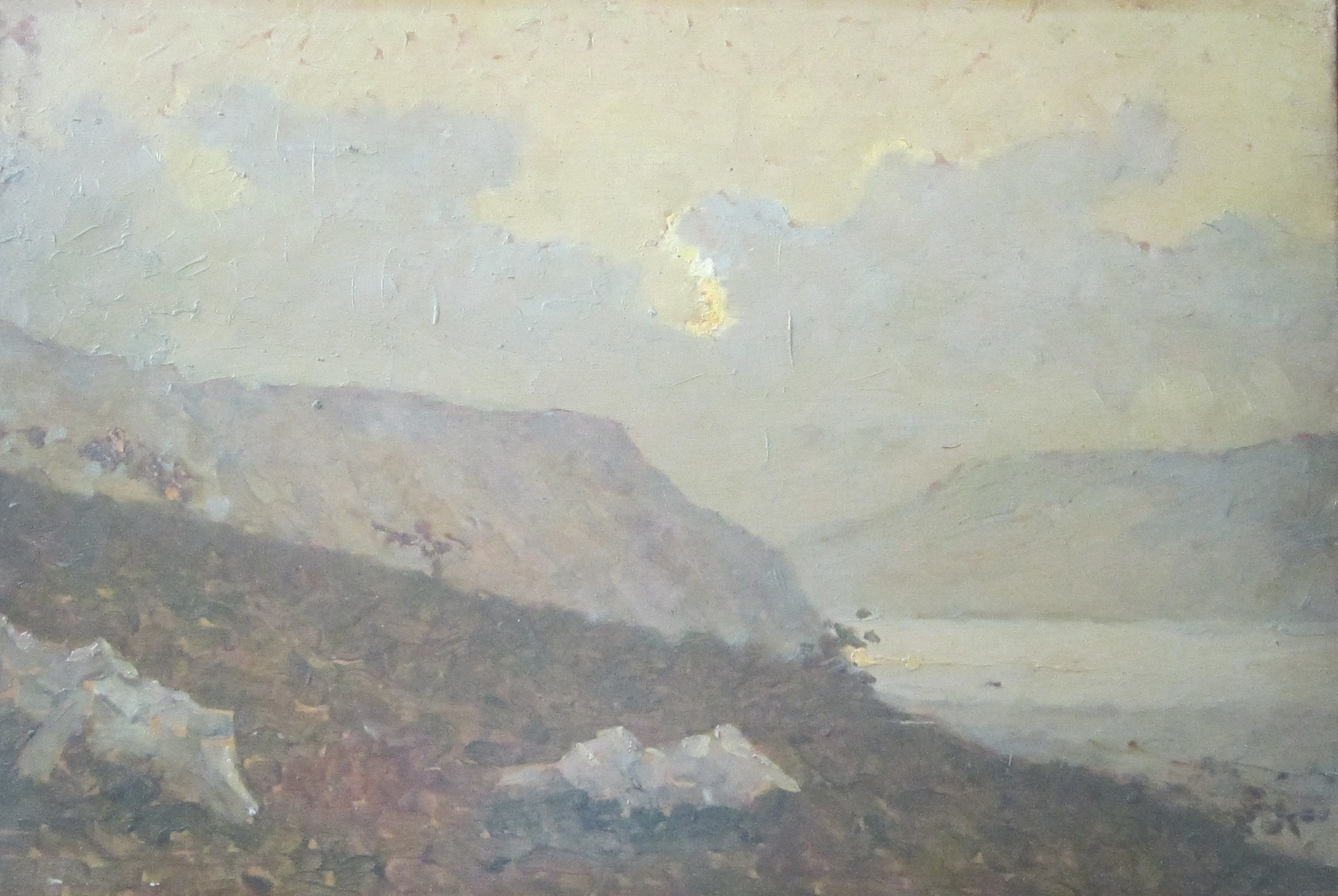
Paesaggio (Landscape) (Macchiaioli style), about 1891, oil on panel, 29x44 cm, private collection.

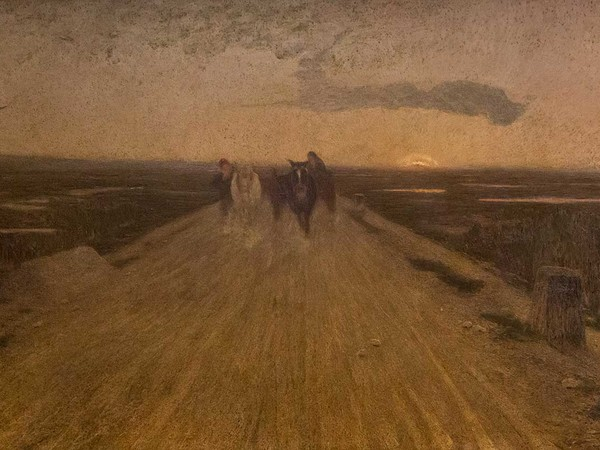
Sera, (Evening) 1898, oil on canvas, 150x300 cm, private collection.

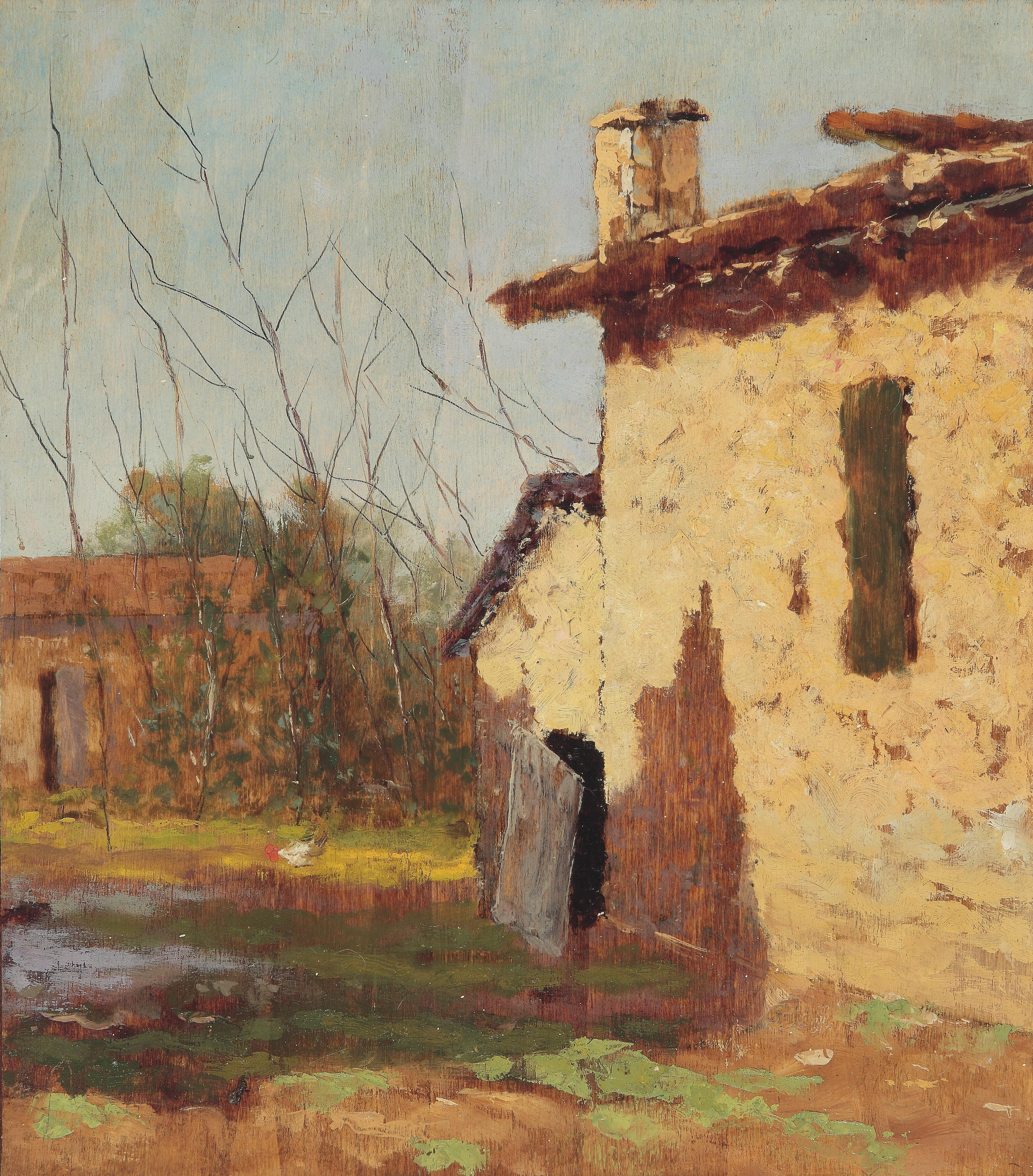
Casa al sole (House under the sun), 1938

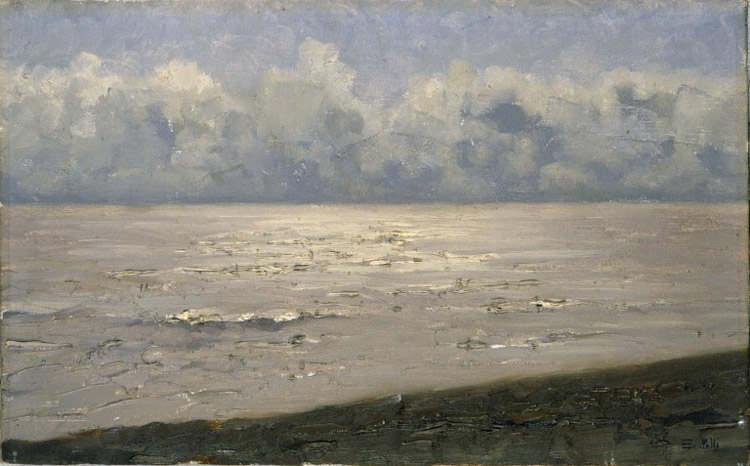
Marina (seascape), 1921, Pinacoteca comunale di Faenza (Municipal Art Gallery of Faenza).

== Photo gallery of Flavio Bertelli ==
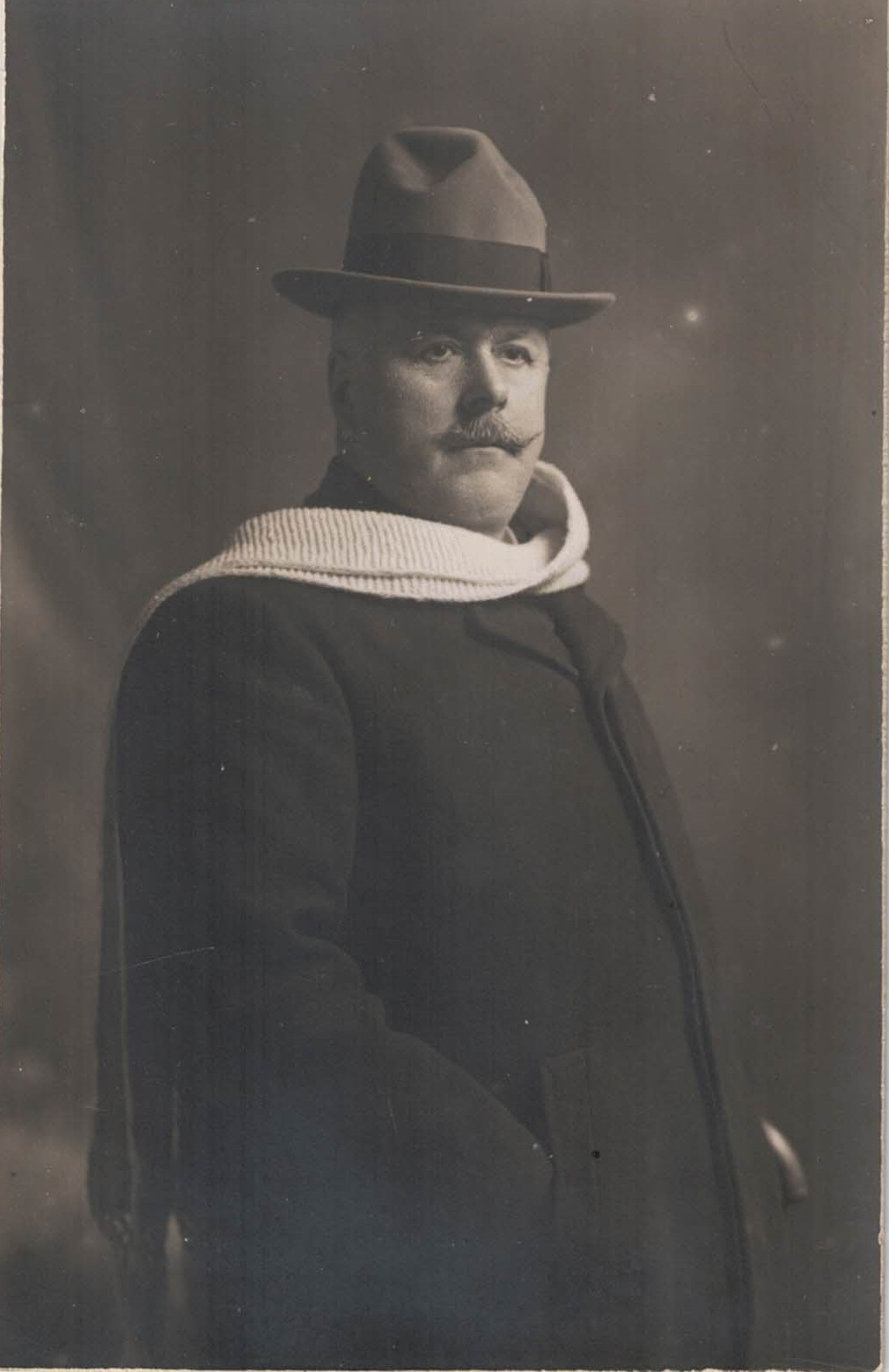
Photo of Flavio Bertelli

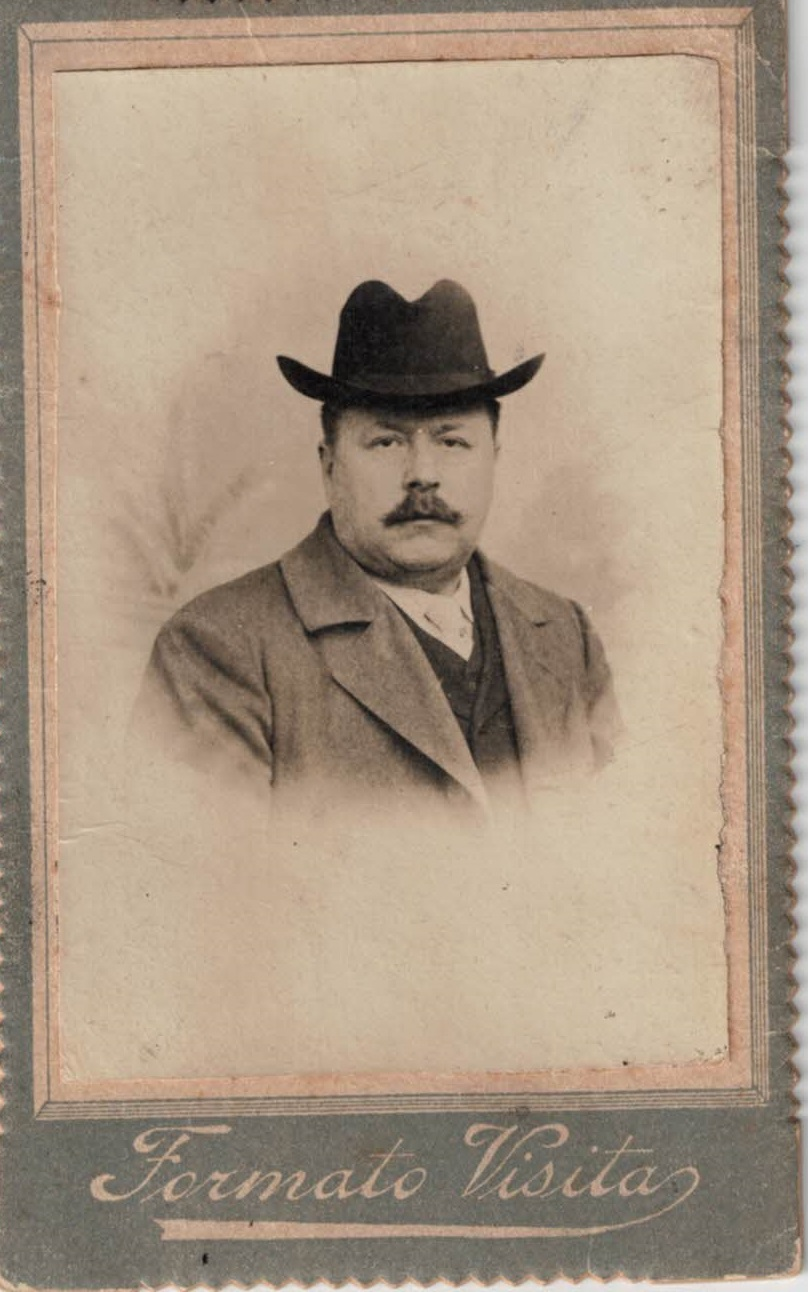
Photo of Flavio Bertelli

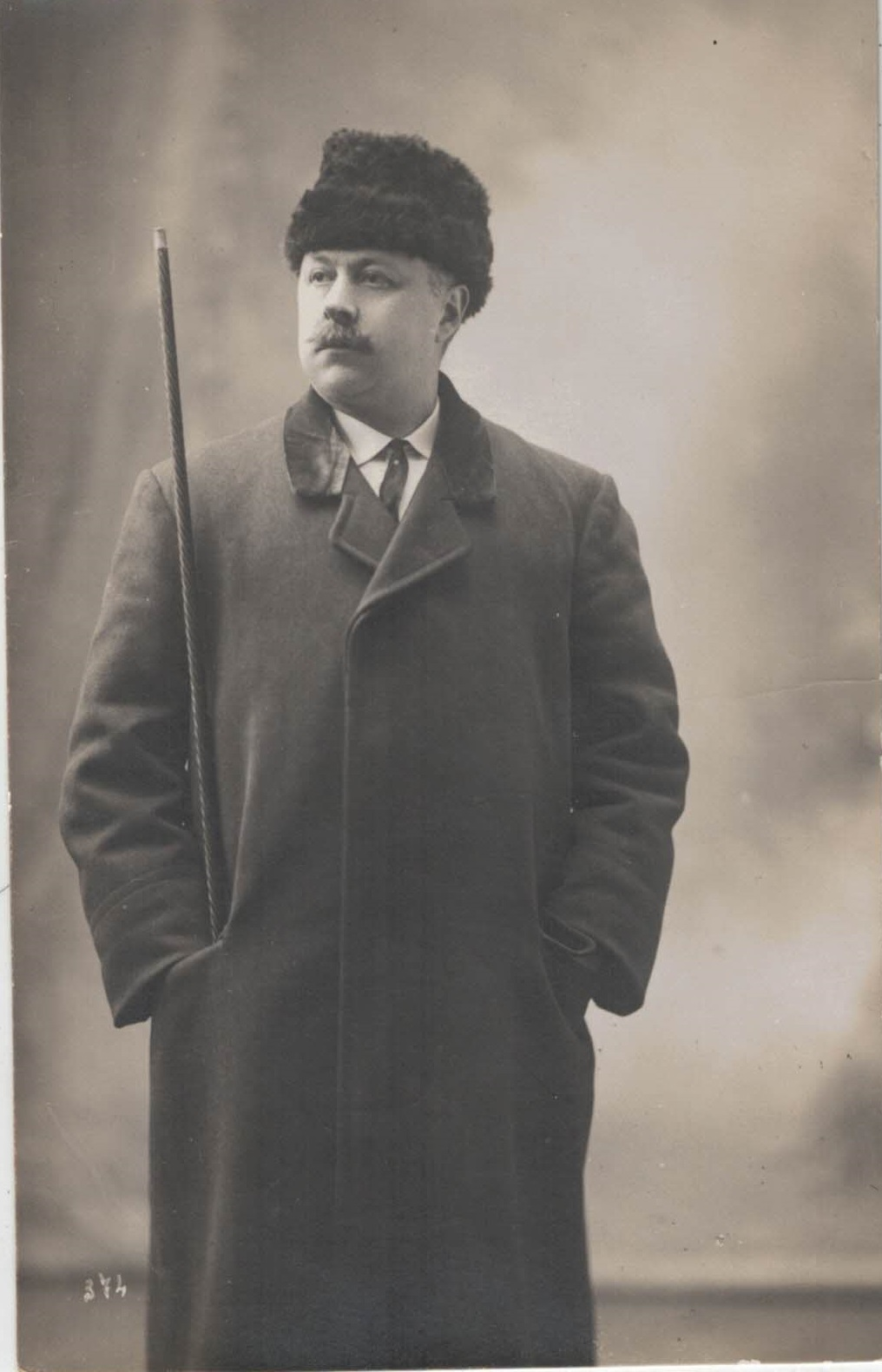
Photo of Flavio Bertelli

== Most important exhibitions ==
- 1952 Exhibition promoted by the Circolo Artistico (Artistic Circle) on the occasion of the tenth anniversary of the artist's death. The catalog lists 92 works, also indicating the ownership of the works. The organizing committee of the exhibition is made up of 5 painters, including Gino Marzocchi and his friend Antonino Sartini.
- 1981 Retrospective exhibition at the "Il 2 di Quadri" Gallery curated by Franco Solmi and Paolo Stivani.
- 1986 L'Associazione Francesco Francia (The Francesco Francia Association) dedicates a retrospective to him, in collaboration with l'Assessorato alla cultura del Comune di Bologna (the Department of Culture of the Municipality of Bologna), curated by Elena Gottarelli.
- 1991 On the fiftieth anniversary of his death, Bottegantica promotes a personal exhibition curated by Elena Gottarelli. From this exhibition a superb color catalog is printed where the works in the exhibition are presented and commented on.
- In the same year, Galleria d'Arte 56 promotes an exhibition curated by Paolo Stivani.
- 2015–2016 L'Associazione culturale Bologna per le Arti (The Bologna Cultural Association for the Arts), in collaboration with the Municipality of Bologna, organizes an anthological exhibition at Palazzo d'Accursio curated by Stella Ingino. The catalog resulting from the exhibition is completely in color (except for 15 black and white photos) with 105 photographs of Bertelli's works, complete with a description and a complete and updated bibliography.

== Bibliography ==
- Esposizione Nazionale di Belle Arti in Bologna, exhibition catalog, printing establishment L. Battei, Parma, 1888, p. 18.
- Brera 1891. Cronaca dell'Esposizione di Belle Arti, (publishing house) Casa editrice Miazzon & C., Milan 1891
- L. Chirtani, Esposizione Triennale di Belle Arti 1894, in «Natura ed Arte», 1894, p. 928.
- Guida critico umoristica alla terza esposizione di belle arti promossa dalla Società Francesco Francia. Note e appunti presi a galoppo da ser Cippelletto e zio Trippa, Cenerelli, Bologna 1897
- Il Natale de l'Accademia de la Lira, Libreria Universitaria, Bologna 1898, p. 94.
- L'Esposizione Nazionale del 1898, exhibition catalog, Turin 1898, p. 114.
- Prima Biennale Romana, Esposizione Nazionale di Belle Arti nel cinquantenario della Capitale, exhibition catalog, (publishing house) Casa editrice d'arte Bestetti e Tumminelli, Rome 1921
- G. Lipparini, ad vocem Flavio Bertelli, in La fiorentina Primaverile. Prima Esposizione Nazionale dell'Opera e del Lavoro d'Arte nel Palazzo del Parco di San Gallo a Firenze, exhibition catalog, (publishing house) Società delle Belle Arti di Firenze, Firenze 1922, p. 20.
- Mostra regionale del sindacato fascista emiliano-romagnolo degli artisti, Galavotti e Roncagli, Bologna 1929
- N. Bertocchi, Ricordo del pittore Flavio Bertelli, «Il Resto del Carlino» (newspaper), 12 January 1942
- I Mostra del paesaggio emiliano romagnolo e retrospettiva di Flavio e Luigi Bertelli: 25 July – 25 August, exhibition catalog, Azienda autonoma di soggiorno, Riccione 1948
- U. Beseghi, Il pittore Flavio Bertelli fu un mite uomo romantico, in «Il Resto del Carlino» (newspaper), 16 April 1952
- I. Cinti (edited by), Mostra retrospettiva di Flavio Bertelli nel decimo anniversario della morte, Circolo Artistico, (publishing house) Arti Grafiche, Bologna 1952
- C. Corazza, Pittori e Scenografi a Bologna intorno alla postuma di Flavio Bertelli, (newspaper) «L'Avvenire d'Italia», 20 April 1952
- V. Tristano, Flavio Bertelli, «Il Pomeriggio», 21 April 1952
- L. Bertacchini, Due veri protagonisti della pittura emiliana, (newspaper) «L'Avvenire d'Italia», 25 November 1967
- C. Corazza (introductory text by), Opere di Luigi e Flavio Bertelli, exhibition catalog, Galleria d'arte del Caminetto, (publishing house) Scuola professionale tipografica sordomuti, Bologna 1967
- E. Gottarelli, Flavio Bertelli fra il divisionismo e il Kitsch, «Il Carrobbio», 1975, I, pp. 193–209.
- L. Cavallari, Immagini padane di un divisionista, in «Il Resto del Carlino» (newspaper), 10 February 1976
- A. Vianelli, Lo Studio Farini ripropone Flavio Bertelli, in «Alla Ribalta», February 1976
- D. Auregli, Un artista bolognese dell'800: Flavio Bertelli, in «L'Unità» (newspaper), 12 December 1981
- F. Solmi, P. Stivani, Retrospettiva di Flavio Bertelli (S. Lazzaro 1865-Rimini 1941), Galleria d'Arte "Il 2 di quadri", exhibition catalog, (publishing house) Arti grafiche Tamari, Bologna 1981
- P. Stivani, Flavio Bertelli Divisionista, Galleria d'arte «Il 2 di quadri», Bologna 1983
- E. Gottarelli (edited by), Flavio Bertelli (1865–1941), Associazione per le Arti «Francesco Francia», exhibition catalog, (publishing house) La Fotocromo emiliana s.r.l., Bologna 1986
- E. Gottarelli (edited by), Flavio Bertelli (1865–1941), exhibition catalog, Bottegantica, Bologna 1991
- P. Stivani, Flavio Bertelli, Galleria d'Arte 65, exhibition catalog, Bologna 1991
- R. Roli, In margine ad alcuni dipinti inediti di Luigi e Flavio Bertelli, «Il Carrobbio», XXXII, 2006, pp. 239–246.
- R. Roli, Da Bertelli a Mandelli, il paesaggio in pittura, 1900–1950, «Il Carrobbio», XXXIII, 2007, pp. 245–258.
- S. Ingino (edited by), S. Del Moro (who reviewed the paintings), Flavio Bertelli. Armoniose visioni di natura 1865–1941, exhibition catalog, Associazione Bologna per le Arti, (publishing house) Grafiche dell'Artiere, Bologna 2015, ISBN 978-88-909463-2-5.
