= Bolognese school =

Art movement in early modern Italy

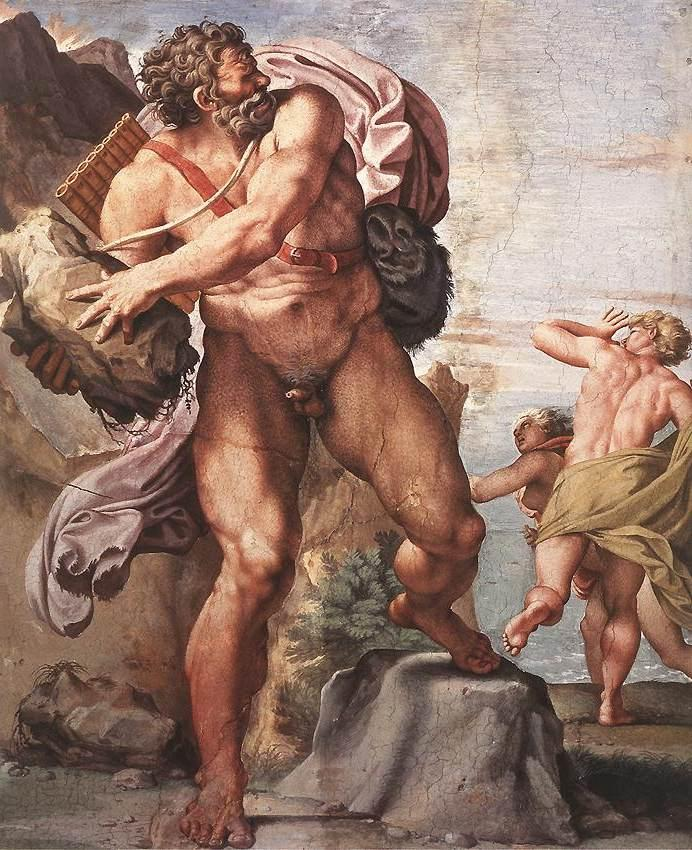
- Annibale Carracci, the Cyclops Polyphemus in his frescos for the Palazzo Farnese
- Years active: 16th–17th centuries
- Location: Bologna

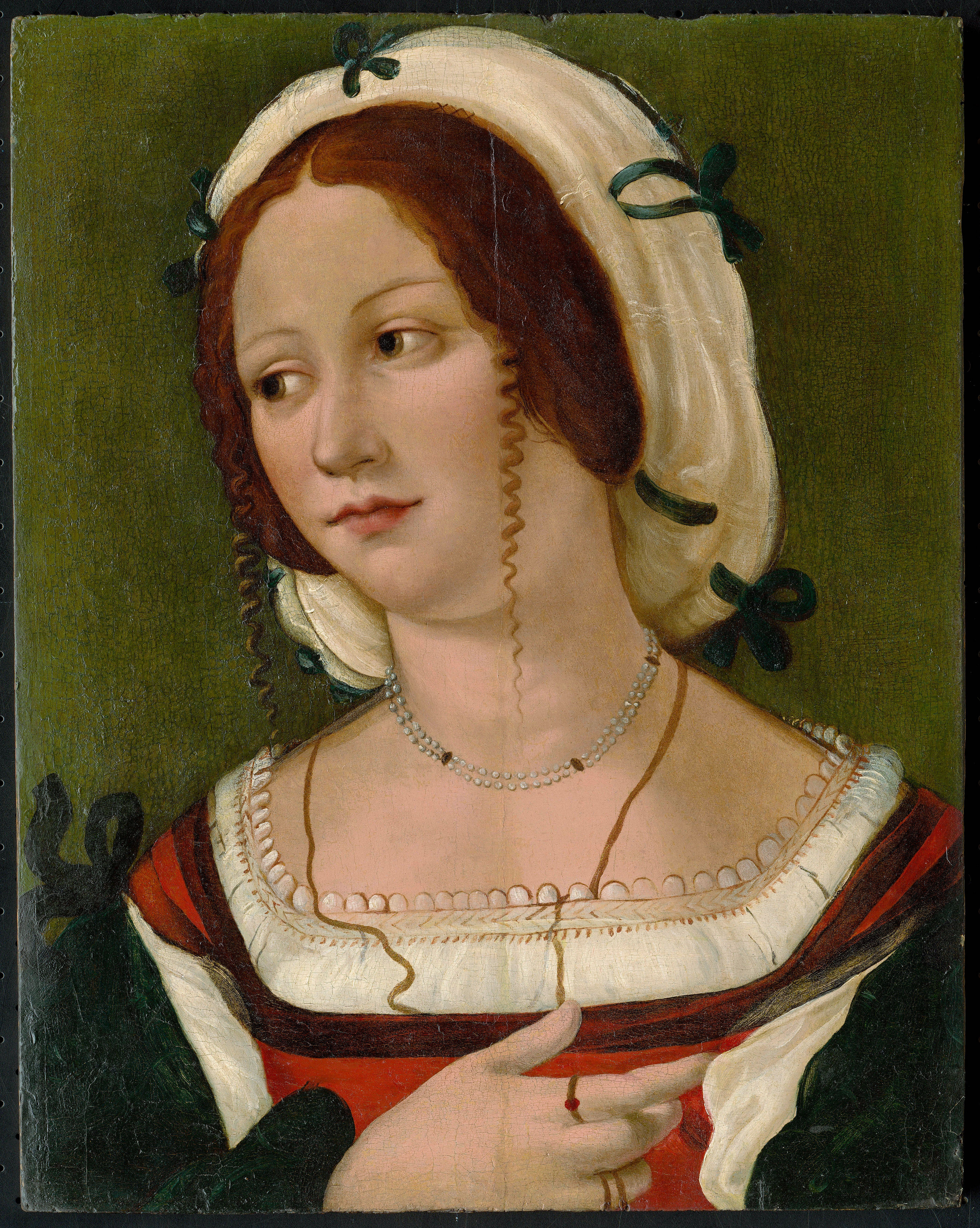
Portrait likely to be of Isabella d'Este, attributed to Francesco Francia, 1511

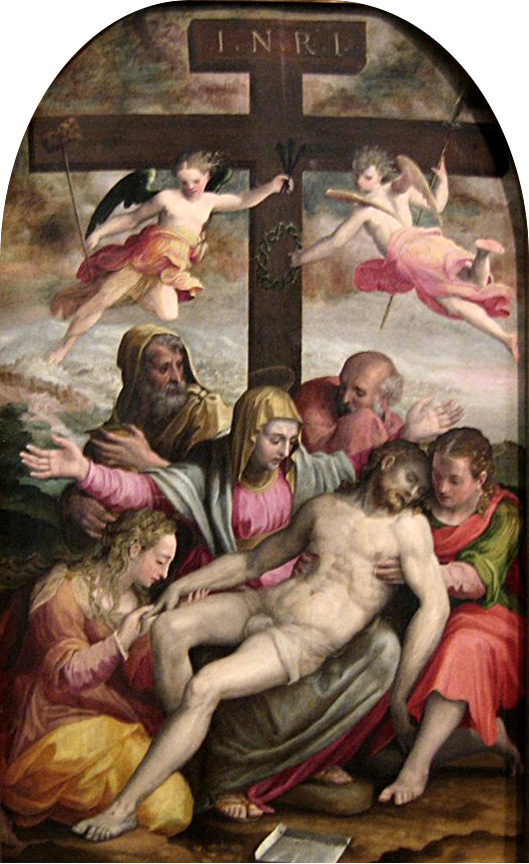
Deposition of Christ by Prospero Fontana, 1563

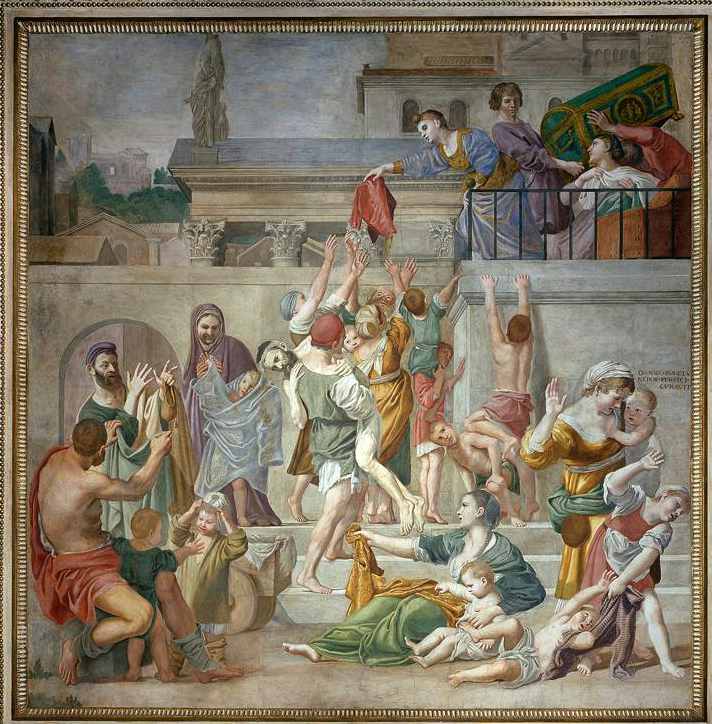
Domenichino, Saint Cecilia Distributing Alms, fresco, 1612–15, San Luigi dei Francesi, Rome

The Bolognese school of painting, also known as the school of Bologna, flourished between the 16th and 17th centuries in Bologna, which rivalled Florence and Rome as the centre of painting in Italy.

Its most important representatives include the Carracci family, including Ludovico Carracci and his two cousins, the brothers Agostino and Annibale Carracci. Later, it included other Baroque painters: Domenichino and Lanfranco, active mostly in Rome, eventually Guercino and Guido Reni, and Accademia degli Incamminati in Bologna, which was run by Lodovico Carracci. Certain artistic conventions, which over time became traditionalist, had been developed in Rome during the first decades of the 16th century. As time passed, some artists sought new approaches to their work that no longer reflected only the Roman manner. The Carracci studio sought innovation or invention, seeking new ways to break away from traditional modes of painting while continuing to look for inspiration from their literary contemporaries; the studio formulated a style that was distinguished from the recognised manners of art in their time. This style was seen as both systematic and imitative, borrowing particular motifs from the past Roman schools of art and innovating a modernistic approach.

== List of artists ==
=== Period of activity: 1501–1600 ===
- Francesco Francia (1447–1517)
- Amico Aspertini (1474–1552)
- Girolamo da Treviso (1497–1544)
- Pier Maria Pennacchi (1464 – before 1516)
- Biagio Pupini (c.1490 - c. 1575)
- Girolamo da Carpi (1501–1556)
- Lorenzo Sabbatini (c. 1530 – 1576)
- Denys Calvaert (1540–1619)
- Pietro Faccini (1552–1614)
- Prospero Fontana (1512–1597)
- Lavinia Fontana (1552–1614)
- Giovanni Francesco Bezzi (Nosadella) (1530–1571)
- Bartolomeo Passerotti (1529–1592)
- Bartolomeo Cesi (1556–1629)
- Annibale Carracci (1560–1609)
- Ludovico Carracci (1555–1619)
- Agostino Carracci (1557–1602)
- Carlo Bononi (1569 – c. 1632)
- Sisto Badalocchio (1581 – c. 1647)
- Camillo Procaccini (1551–1629)

=== 1601–1650 ===
- Angelo Michele Toni
- Benedetto Gennari
- Guido Reni (1575–1642)
- Domenichino (1581–1641)
- Francesco Albani (1578–1660)
- Giovanni Francesco Barbieri (Guercino) (1591–1666)
- Lionello Spada
- Lucio Massari
- Francesco Brizio
- Giacomo Cavedone
- Bartolomeo Schedoni
- Francesco Gessi (1558–1649)
- Simone Cantarini (Il Pesarese) (1612–1648)
- Carlo Cignani (1628–1719)
- Giovanni Antonio Burrini
- Giovanni Gioseffo dal Sole
- Lorenzo Pasinelli (1629–1772)
- Elisabetta Sirani (1638–1665)
- Marcantonio Franceschini
- Guido Cagnacci (1601–1663)
- Giuseppe Maria Mazza (sculptor, 1653–1741)
- Lorenzo Garbieri (1580–1654)
- Domenico Maria Canuti (1620–1660)
- Angelo Michele Colonna (1604–1687)
- Agostino Mitelli (1609–1660)
- Enrico Haffner (1640–1702)
- Giovanni Maria Bibiena
- Giovan Giacomo Monti
- Giovanni Battista Viola
- Alessandro Tiarini
- Giovanni Andrea Donducci (il Mastelletta)

=== 1650–1700 and after ===
- Giuseppe Maria Crespi (1665–1747)
- Donato Creti (1671–1749)
- Ubaldo Gandolfi (1728–1781)
- Gaetano Gandolfi (1734–1802)
- Giuseppe Marchesi (il Sansone; 1778–1867)

=== 1850–1960 (approximately) The landscape painters ===
- Luigi Bertelli (1833–1916)
- Alessandro Scorzoni (1858–1933)
- Flavio Bertelli (1865–1941)
- Giovanni Secchi (1876–1950)
- Guglielmo Pizzirani (1886–1971)
- Antonino Sartini (1889–1954)

== See also ==
- Florentine school
- Lucchese school
- School of Ferrara
- Sienese school
- Renaissance in Emilia
