= Antonino Sartini =

Italian painter

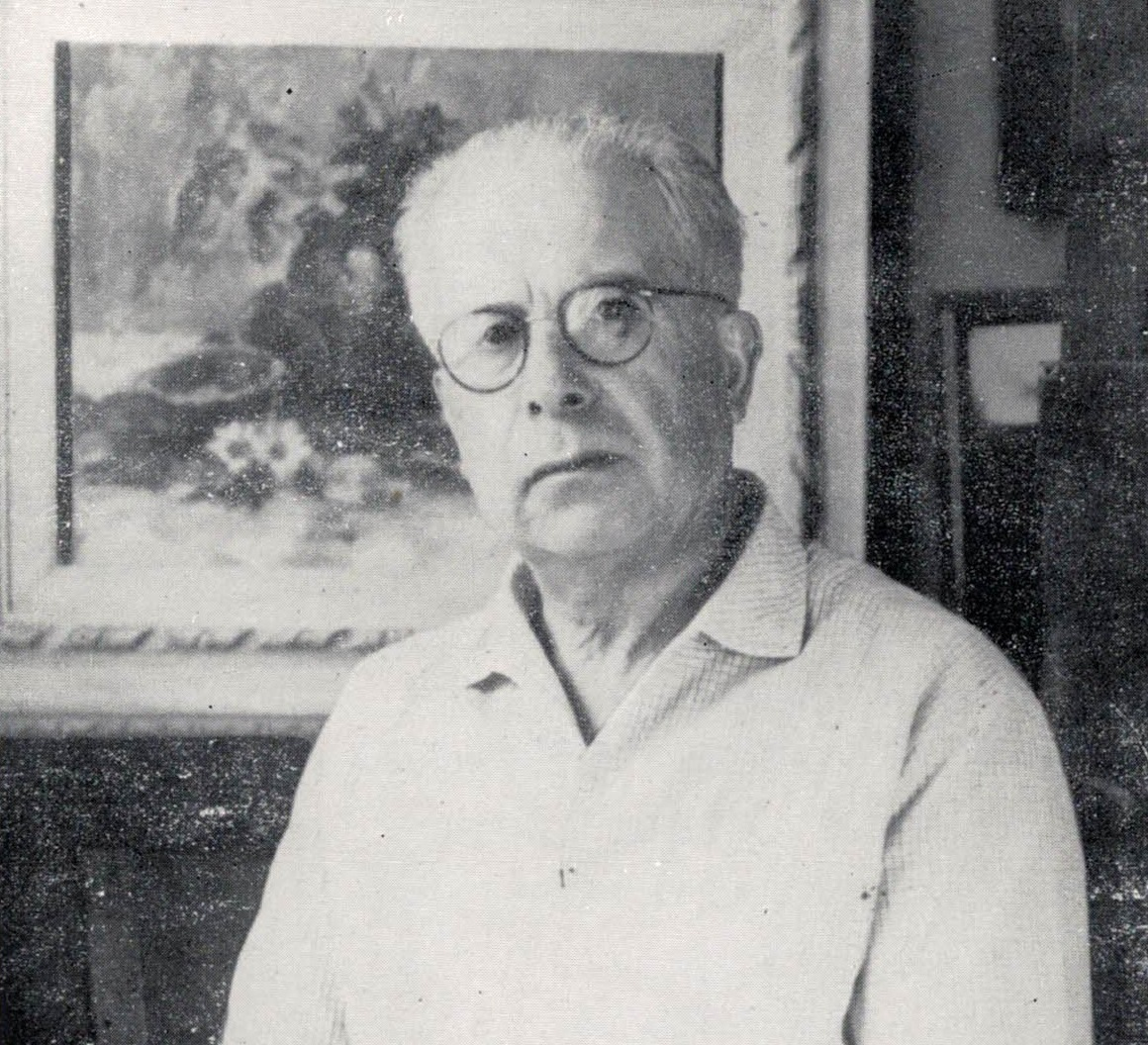
Antonino Sartini's photo in 1950

Antonino Sartini (Crespellano, 1889 – Bazzano, 7 May 1954) was an Italian painter.

He has been called the "painter of serenity" and belongs to that group of landscape painters of the early 1900s of the "Bolognese School of Painting", such as Luigi and Flavio Bertelli, Giovanni Secchi, Guglielmo Pizzirani, Alessandro Scorzoni, Gino Marzocchi and Garzia Fioresi, who painted the Emilia-Romagna landscapes, reproducing its beauty and witnessing its changes over time, with the paintbrush.

== Biography ==
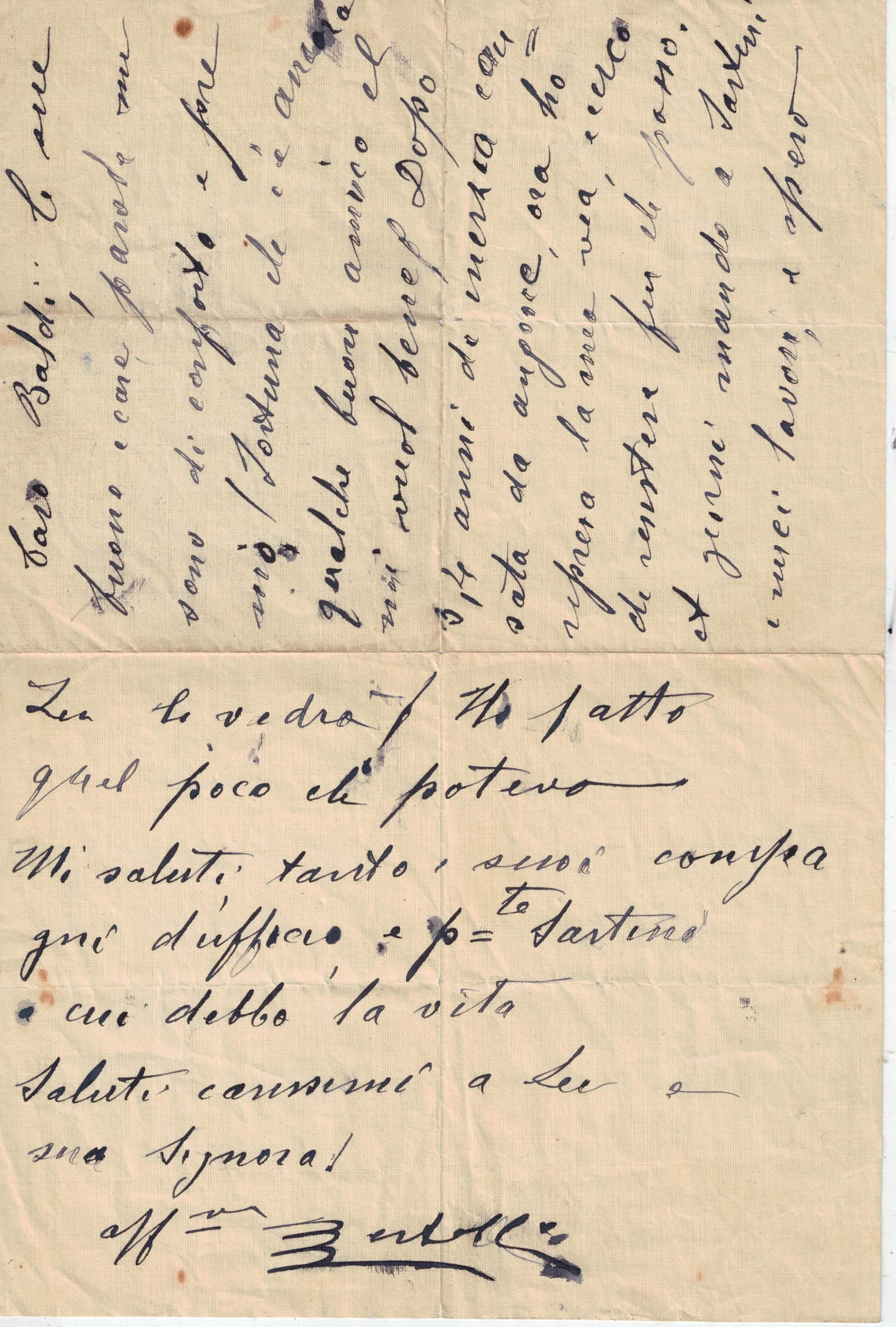
Letter from Flavio Bertelli to Baldi Alfredo (also a friend of Sartini), in which he expresses his gratitude towards Sartini.

Born in Crespellano in 1889, once a municipality [now merged into the new municipality of Valsamoggia] about twenty kilometers from Bologna and a few more kilometers from Modena, Antonino Sartini trained in an environment full of stimuli for art and painting : his father, Luigi, is an expert decorator, from whom he learns the first notions of painting; his brother Giuseppe, two years older, is a painter.

During the First World War, he performed military service in the health care sector, first at the military hospital in Bologna and then in the field hospitals, close to the front. In February 1918 his girlfriend Irene Berozzi died and after the death of the girl the young Sartini began to paint following the lessons of his “masters” Alessandro Scorzoni and Flavio Bertelli. Sartini will remain a friend of the latter for life, sharing with Flavio Bertelli for many years the studio in via del Poggiale, now via Nazario Sauro in Bologna, and supporting him for a long time both psychologically and concretely in the difficulties of his life, hosting him in Crespellano during a period of economic difficulty in the early 1930s. Meanwhile Sartini found a job as a draftsman at the Ufficio del Catasto (Land Registry Office), but this did not prevent him from continuing to cultivate his love for painting.

First known works of Sartini are from the late 1920s and his first personal exhibition is in January 1931: at the "Galleria d'Arte" (Art Gallery) of Casa Berti Pichat, where Sartini presents 27 works in a room reserved only for him, alongside other spaces reserved for Flavio Bertelli and other painters, for a total of 75 works on display. Here, Sartini is greeted by critics in laudatory tones: the chronicler Armando Pelliccioni wrote in 1931 in the newspaper "il Pavaglione": "Antonino Sartini is a new recruit who joins the numerous squad of Bolognese artists. He is a rookie who shows himself with such qualities that many stars of the local firmament have not yet achieved and, perhaps, never will ". Another chronicler, Nino Padano, wrote in the "Corriere Padano" also in 1931: "Antonino Sartini, who is exposed to the public for the first time, was a kind of revelation. In fact, as soon as you enter the room, you try immediately the impression of being attracted by the luminous and singing variety of his painting". And always the same chronicler writes in the newspaper "Le arti plastiche" (The plastic arts): "Sartini has an undoubted and lively native taste for painting". Finally, the chronicler Italo Cinti, writes in "Il comune di Bologna" (the Municipality of Bologna): "Sartini is a source of joy: he has such works that some very indignant censors would also like". The podestà of Bologna personally chooses and approves the purchase of some of the works exhibited to enrich the municipal gallery of modern art at Villa Armandi Avogli [the current Villa delle Rose] and to encourage the work of local artists: by Flavio Bertelli the painting Solitudine (Solitude) is acquired; By Sartini, the painting Vecchia strada a Bazzano (Old street in Bazzano). Both works do not appear today in the collections of the Galleria d’arte moderna (Bologna Gallery of Modern Art), because they probably went missing, along with many others during the Second World War. By Sartini, on the other hand, the oil Paesaggio di neve (Landscape of snow) of the same year 1931 is preserved in the Galleria comunale (Municipal Gallery). Still in 1931, in August, he participates in the "mostra del paesaggio porrettano" (exhibition of the Porretta landscape) at Porretta Terme (today a hamlet of Alto Reno Terme), together with other painters including his friend Flavio Bertelli. In the following years, the presence of Sartini's works at local exhibitions multiplied.

== Style ==
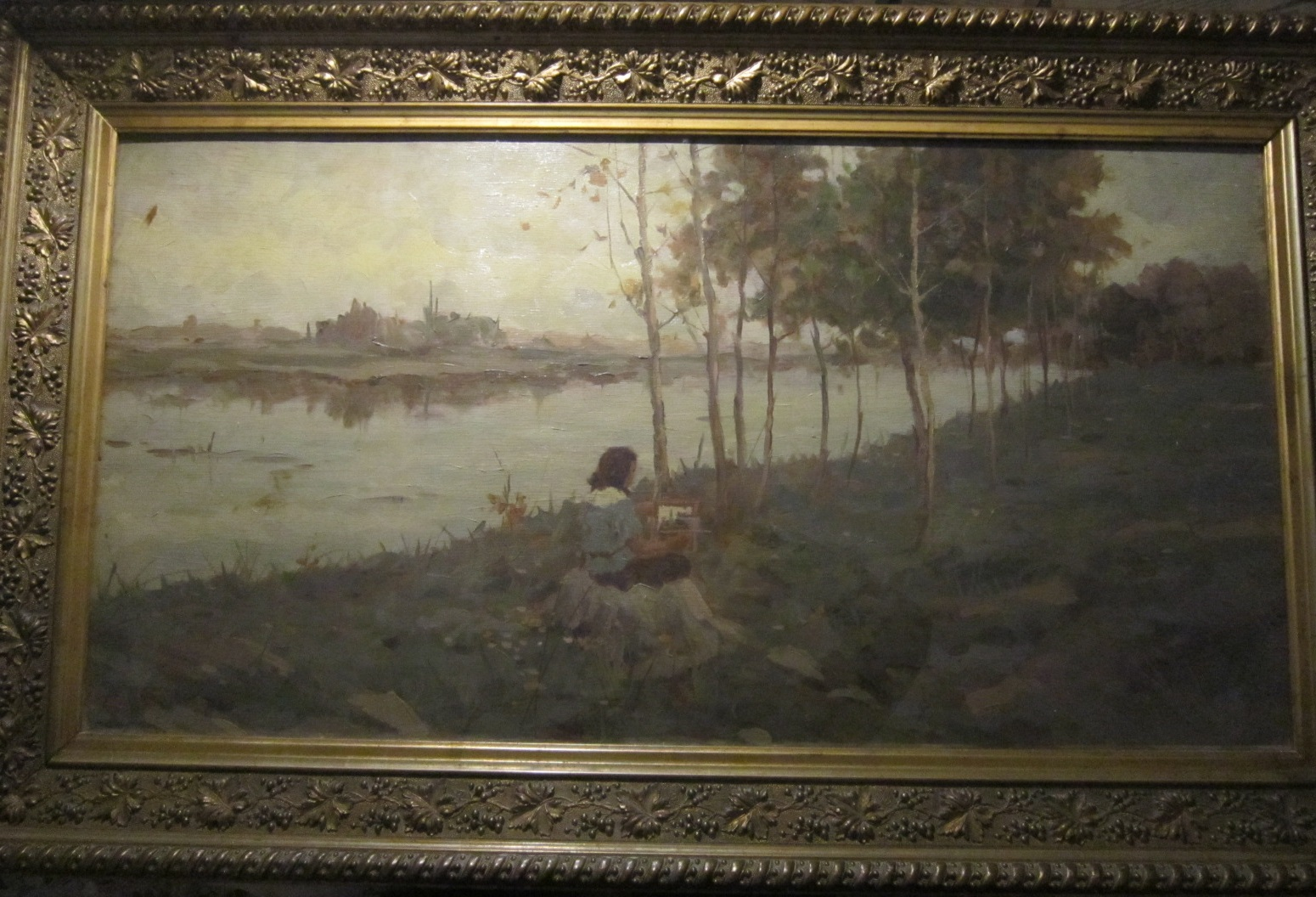
Donna in riva al fiume ("Woman by the river" private collection)

The psychological and aesthetic attitude of many of his works is of a crepuscular matrix, sweetly vespertine. Sartini's painting certainly has something of the Macchiaioli style, as well as undergoing the well-known influences of Bertelli (Luigi and Flavio). In fact, Umberto Beseghi (scholar and historian of the art, contemporary of Sartini) writes:

Antonino Sartini has been called a "Bertelliano". Saying this does not take anything away from him and his art. However, it is also necessary to recognize that he added his own personality to the school of the two great Bolognese painters, his style and that serene goodness that was in his character.

His way of painting is characterized by light touches, round spots, which give a sense of form, without weighing it down with contours or accentuated masses. In many of his works, in fact, everything appears to be intuited in its essence, as hinted at if not even reconstructed and humanized, through a light, never coldly descriptive image of things, where the viewer remains free to complete it and contemplate it with his own feeling. Many of his paintings testify to this, including Bucato al sole from 1930, Paesaggio from 1931, owned by the Gallery of Modern Art in Bologna, Lungo il rio from 1935, and Tessitrice [Weaver] from 1940.

Sartini does not limit himself to painting landscapes, but also portraits. And in the portrait Sartini knows how to grasp that intimate truth that puts the subject out of time: Portrait of Flavio Bertelli of 1931, Nostalgia of 1935, Contemplazione of 1942. About him, Umberto Beseghi (scholar and historian of the art, contemporary of Sartini) wrote in 1956:

There are the landscapes and the figures, which Antonino Sartini knew how to deal with subtle sensitivity, with depth of feeling, with psychological intuition, with that truth that does not deny, [...], but he knows how to transfuse in others what he sees and feels.
