= Macron (sportswear) =

Italian sportswear company

Macron S.p.A.
- Type: Private
- Industry: Textile
- Founded: 1971; 55 years ago
- Headquarters: Crespellano, Bologna, Italy
- Area served: Worldwide
- Key people: Francesco Bormioli; (President); Gianluca Pavanello; (CEO)
- Products: Sportswear; Sports equipment
- Revenue: ▲€196.6 million (2023)
- Number of employees: 808 (2026)
- Website: macron.com

Macron S.p.A. is an Italian manufacturer of sportswear and athletic clothing, headquartered in Crespellano, Bologna. It is considered a European leader in the production of active sportswear.

== Origin of name ==
The company's name comes from the greek prefix "μακρο-" (makro-) which means "large". This is to emphasize the large scope of the company and its view for the business. It was then modified to "Macron" to be the opposite of "micron", which is a unit of length to measure something small.

== History ==
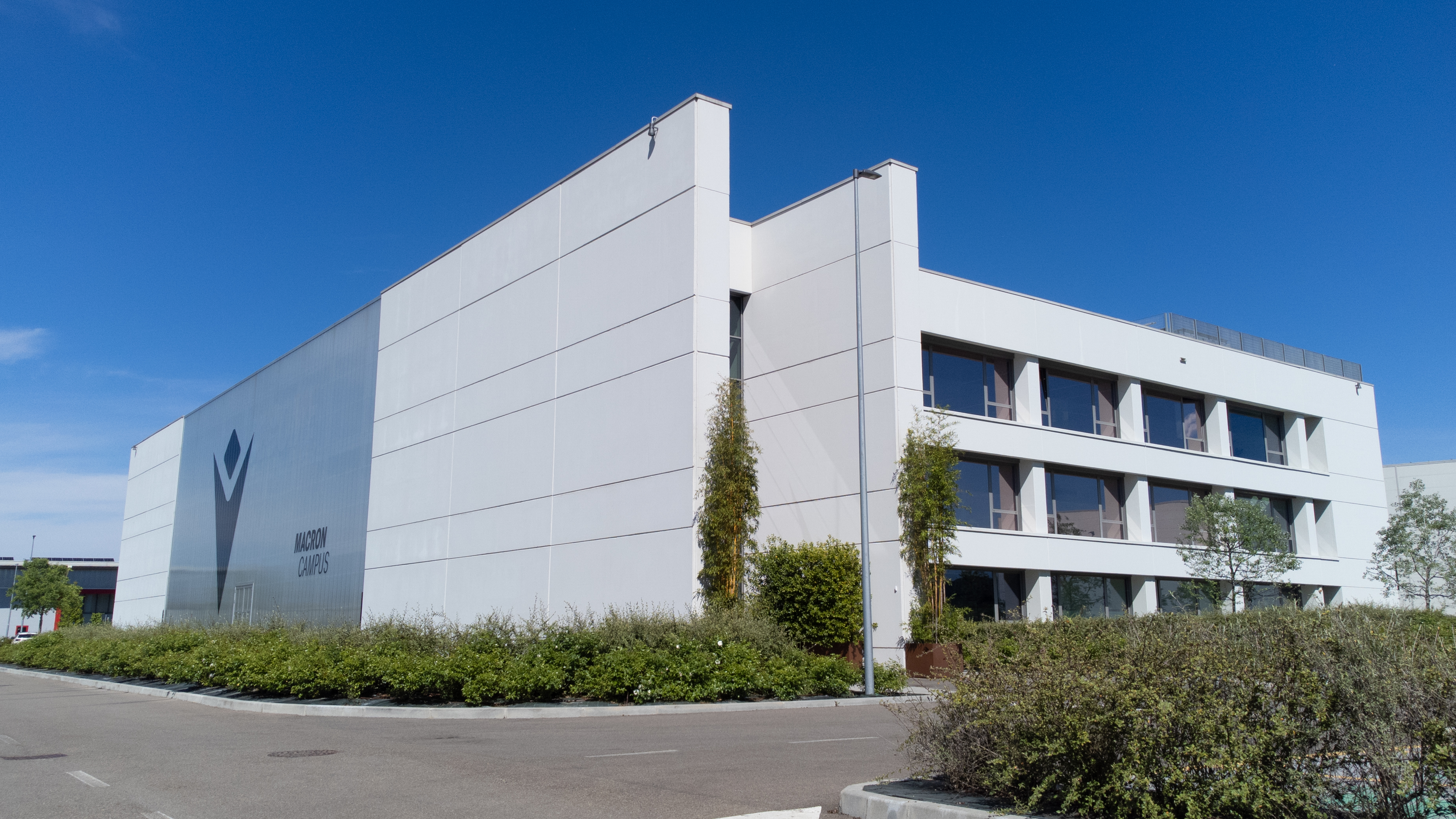
Macron Campus

Macron was founded in 1971 as a distributor of American sportswear brands in Italy. A major expansion of the organisation took place in 1994, coincident with relocation and consolidation to Crespellano.

Macron began providing teamwear to professional football in 2001, its first contract being with Bologna. Expansion beyond the domestic Italian market began in 2005.

In 2014, Macron secured a four-year agreement with Bolton Wanderers for naming rights to their home stadium, with the stadium becoming known as the Macron Stadium from July 2014. Macron supplanted Reebok as both stadium sponsor and kit supplier.

== Corporate governance ==
As of 2014, Macron's chief executive officer (CEO) was Gianluca Pavanello. and the company's president was Francesco Bromioli.
