= Alessandro Scorzoni =

Italian painter (1858–1933)

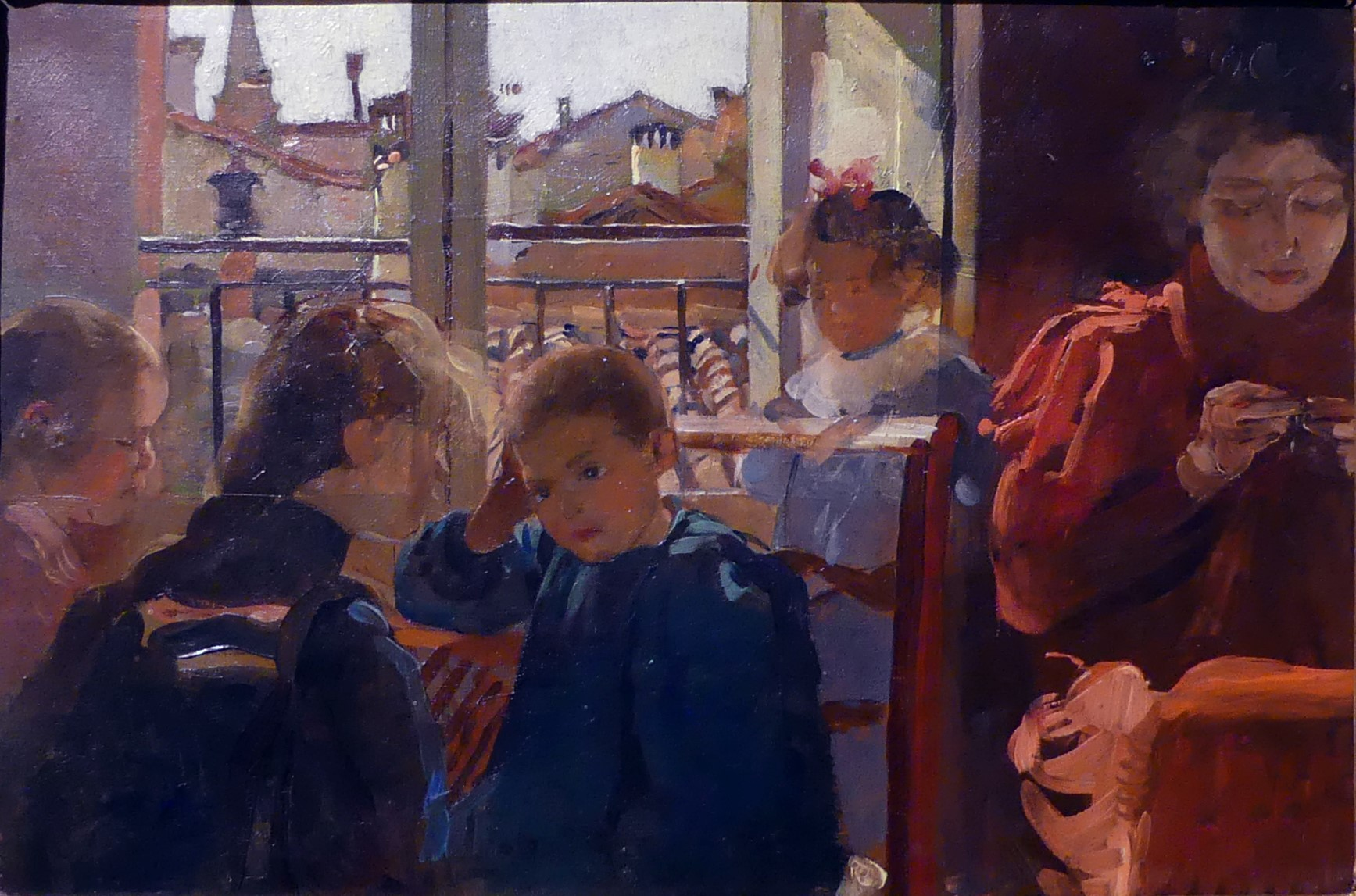
My Family (1898) at the Museo Ottocento Bologna

Alessandro Scorzoni (April 22, 1858, in Calcara di Crespellano, Province of Bologna – July 31, 1933, in Bologna) was an Italian painter, who depicted eclectic subjects, including sacred images, allegorical paintings, portraits, and landscapes.

== Biography ==
Born to a family of limited resources, he studied under Antonio Puccinelli and Salvatore Muzzi at the Bolognese Academy of Fine Arts. He also worked at painted interior decoration and illustrations for publications.

Among his fresco works, he painted 18 lunettes depicting the rural lifestyle for the villa Giovannina (Villa Calari) in Cento. He also painted a fresco of "San Martino distributes charity to poor" for the Castello dei Manzoli (Castello di San Martino in Soverzano), located near Minerbio, where he participated in the restoration works by Tito Azzolini and Alfonso Rubbiani. Other major works are frescoes for palazzo Malvezzi and the oratory of San Michele in Bosco.

His landscapes depict views surrounding Bologna, including San Ruffillo, il Savena, and l'Idice. Among his illustrations are l'Albo unico and "Anche Bologna!" (1880 Circolo Artistico) and "Il Natale della Lira" (1898, Accademia della Lira). He also made designs of decoration for ceramics of the Manifattura Minghetti, and completed two tapestries of "Amor Ardente" e "Amor Calmo" in Palazzo Corni in Modena. In 1884, he was awarded the Bevilacqua Prize. From 1895 al 1906, Scorzoni displayed works at the exhibitions of the "Francesco Francia" Art Association. In 1898, he was made honorary academic at the Bolognese Academy of Fine Arts, and Resident Academic in 1905. Scorzoni had as a pupil the painter Antonino Sartini. He died destitute in the Ospedale Maggiore of Bologna.

Retrospective exhibits of his work were held in December–January 1982, at the Museo Civico of Bologna, and in the fall of 1999 at the Museo Storico Didattico della Tappezzeria, in the Villa Spada of Bologna.
