= Antonio Puccinelli =

Italian painter (1822–1897)

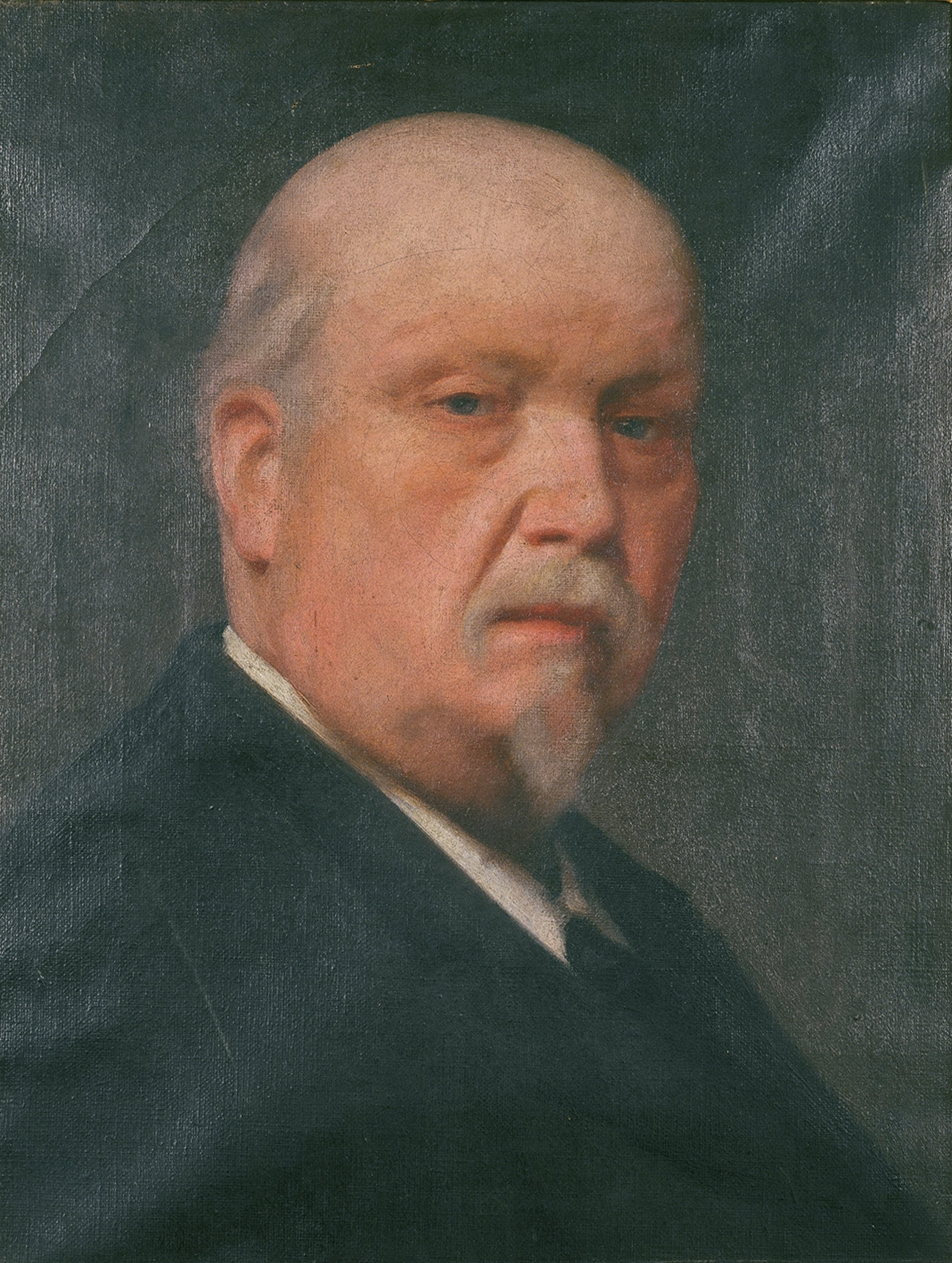
Self-portrait (1861)

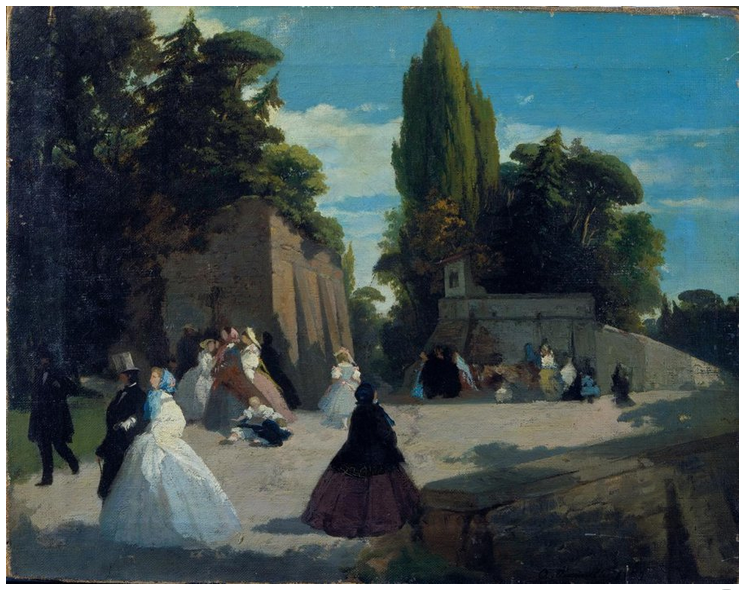
A Walking Tour at the Muro Torto

Antonio Puccinelli (19 March 1822, Castelfranco di Sotto - 22 July 1897, Florence) was an Italian painter; one of the group known as the "Macchiaioli".

== Biography ==
He was the son of a tailor and was planning to follow his father in that trade, but a group of local citizens noticed his talent for art. Thanks to a scholarship, he was able to attend the Accademia di Belle Arti di Firenze, where he studied with Giuseppe Bezzuoli. In 1846, he won the Grand Prize there for his painting The Young Moses Tramples the Crown of Pharaoh (Now at the Galleria d'Arte Moderna).

During the Revolutions of 1848, he enlisted in the Tuscan Expeditionary Corps and fought in the First Italian War of Independence. After the war's end, he received another scholarship and spent three years in Rome (1849-1852), where he worked with Tommaso Minardi and was influenced by purismo. He was also attracted to the works of Dominique Ingres.

He was among the first artists to become habitués of the Caffè Michelangiolo, which was a favorite meeting place of the Macchiaioli (a group that rejected the prevailing Academicism), until 1870. His first painting in the new style came in 1852, with La passeggiata del Muro Torto (Walking Tour at the Muro Torto).

Shortly after, he opened a studio in Florence and became a Professor at the Accademia. In 1859, he was awarded a prize at the Concorso Ricasoli for his portrait of Vincenzo Gioberti. He also participated in the Esposizione Nazionale of 1861. His success there resulted in an appointment as a professor at the Accademia di Belle Arti di Bologna.

In 1862, he married Francesca Guasconi, with whom he had been having a relationship for ten years. This was probably a last wish, as she died shortly thereafter and he married Adelaide Badioli, a cousin of one of his students.

In the years after 1872, for unknown reasons, his output gradually decreased. In 1897, he retired from the Accademia in Bologna and died not long after.
