= Guglielmo Pizzirani =

Italian painter

- Born: 1886; Bologna, Italy
- Died: 1971 (aged 84–85); Bologna, Italy
- Known for: Painting, sculpture
- Notable work: Landscapes, portraiture
- Movement: Gruppo Moderno Italiano (Modern Italian Group)

Guglielmo Pizzirani (1886–1971) was an Italian painter and teacher, belonging to the modernist group Gruppo Moderno Italiano (Modern Italian Group), and active in Bologna, Italy.

From 1909 he taught and exhibited his work at the three Secessioni Romane (Roman Secessions of 1913–1915), organised by the Roman School. In 1920 Pizzirani began participating in the Biennale di Venezia, as well as organising his first personal exhibition at the "Francesco Francia" Society. From 1931 he attended and exhibited at various sessions of the Rome Quadriennale.

In 1965, Pizzirani received the Gold Medal and the Certificate of Merit for Culture and the Arts, from the Italian Ministry of Public Education and several prizes from the Province of Bologna.

== Awards ==
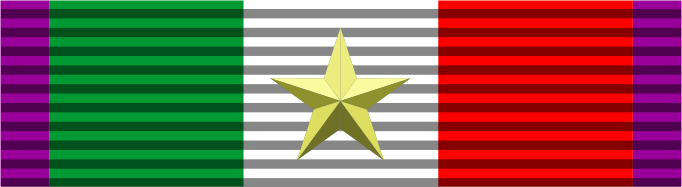
- — Italian Order of Merit for Culture and Art, on 2 June 1965.
- — Order of Merit of the Italian Republic, in Rome, 2 June 1969.

== Bibliography ==
- AA.VV., Guglielmo Pizzirani 1886-1971, Bologna, Associazione Bologna per le Arti, 2010. (in Italian)
