= Crespellano =

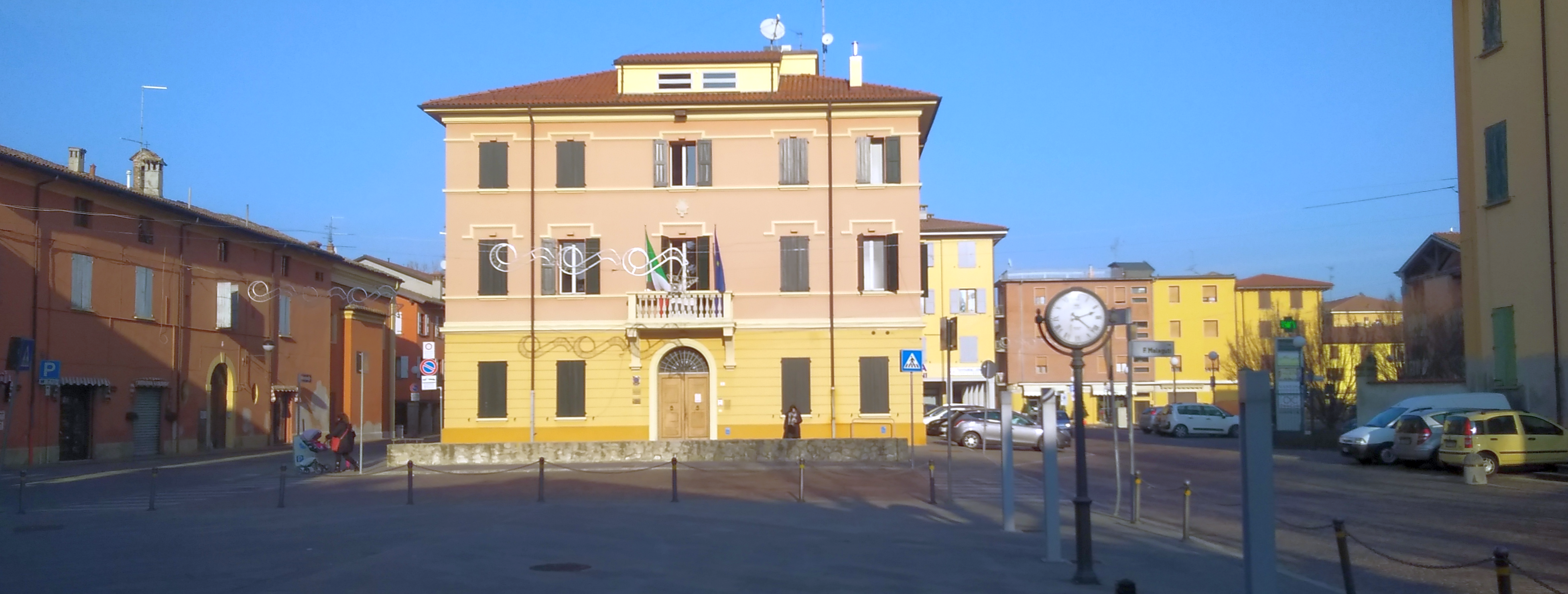
Crespellano

Crespellano is a frazione of comune (municipality) of Valsamoggia in the Metropolitan City of Bologna, in the Italian region Emilia-Romagna. It is located about 15 kilometres (9 mi) west of Bologna.

The main attraction is the Palazzo Garagnani, a former patrician villa of the Bentivoglio family of Bolognese lords.

The Italian painter Antonino Sartini was born in this place in 1889.
