= Abruzzo =

Region in southern Italy

Coordinates: 42°21′58″N 12°23′40″E

Abruzzo Aprùzzu / Aprùzzo Abruzzi
- Region
- Flag Coat of arms

- Location of Abruzzo in Italy
- Country: Italy
- Capital: L'Aquila
- Largest city: Pescara

Government
  - Type: Presidential system
  - President: Marco Marsilio (FdI)

Area
  - Total: 10,831.84 km^{2} (4,182.20 sq mi)
- Highest elevation: 2,914 m (9,560 ft)

Population (2026)
  - Total: 1,267,222
  - Density: 116.9905/km^{2} (303.0039/sq mi)
- Demonym: Italian: Abruzzese

GDP
  - Total: €40.761 billion (2024)
  - Per capita: €32,121 (2024)
- Time zone: UTC+1 (CET)
  - Summer (DST): UTC+2 (CEST)
- ISO 3166 code: IT-65
- HDI (2021): 0.892 very high · 13th of 21
- NUTS Region: ITF
- Website: Official website

Abruzzo (US: /ɑːˈbruːtsoʊ, əˈ-/, UK: /æˈbrʊtsoʊ/, Italian: [aˈbruttso]; Neapolitan: Aprùzzo [aˈpruttsə], Sabino: Aprùzzu [aˈpruttsu]), historically also known as Abruzzi, is a region of Southern Italy. It has a population of nearly 1.3 million in an area of 10,831.84 square kilometres (4,182.20 sq mi). It is divided into four provinces: L'Aquila, Teramo, Pescara, and Chieti. Its western border, shared with Lazio, lies 80 km (50 mi) east of Rome. L'Aquila is both the capital city of the Abruzzo region and of the Province of L'Aquila, and is the second largest city. The other provincial capitals are Pescara, which is Abruzzo's largest city and major port, Teramo, and Chieti. Other large cities and towns in Abruzzo include the industrial and high tech center Avezzano, as well as three important industrial and touristic centers, Vasto, Lanciano, and Sulmona.

Abruzzo borders the region of Marche to the north, Lazio to the west and northwest, Molise to the south, and the Adriatic Sea to the east. Geographically, Abruzzo is divided into a mountainous area in the west, which includes the highest massifs of the Apennines, such as the Gran Sasso d'Italia and the Maiella, and a coastal area in the east, with beaches on the Adriatic Sea.

Culturally, Abruzzo is considered a region of Southern Italy; however, geographically it is often considered part of Central Italy. Because of its historic association with the Kingdom of the Two Sicilies, the Italian statistical authority ISTAT deems it to be part of Southern Italy.

Abruzzo is known as "the greenest region in Europe" as half of the region's territory is protected through national parks and nature reserves, more than any other region in Italy. There are three national parks, one regional park, and 38 protected nature reserves. These ensure the survival of rare species, such as the golden eagle, the Abruzzo (or Abruzzese) chamois, the Apennine wolf, and the Marsican brown bear. Abruzzo's parks and reserves host 75% of Europe's animal species. The region is also home to Calderone, one of Europe's southernmost glaciers.

Nineteenth-century Italian diplomat and journalist Primo Levi (1853–1917) chose the adjectives forte e gentile ("strong and kind") to capture what he saw as the character of the region and its people. Forte e gentile has since become the motto of the region.

== Etymology ==
The name Abruzzo, according to the most accredited hypothesis first proposed by Renaissance historian Flavio Biondo in Italia Illustrata, derives from Aprutium as a popular evolution of (ad) Praetutium, meaning "land of the Praetutii", an ancient Italic people that lived in the area of present-day Teramo. According to other hypotheses, the name could also derive from abruptus (Latin for "steep" or "precipitous").

In the 1273 Treaty of Alife, King Charles I of Anjou divided the Justiciarate of Abruzzo (Giustizierato d'Abruzzo) into two territories along the Pescara river: Abruzzo Citeriore ("nearer Abruzzo") and Abruzzo Ulteriore ("further Abruzzo"); from this division, the region was also known by the plural name Abruzzi.

== History ==
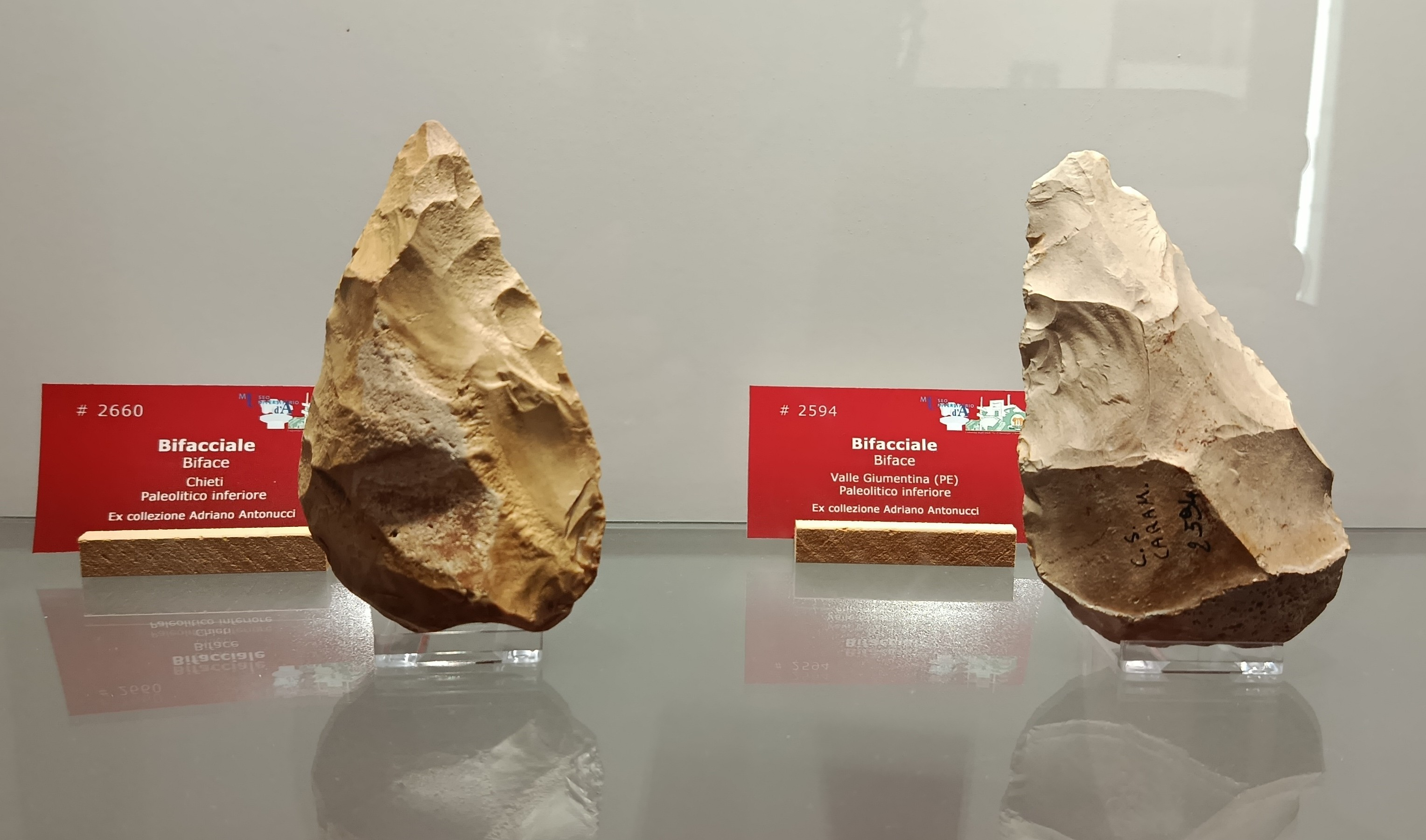
Lower Paleolithic hand axes from Valle Giumentina at Caramanico Terme and Chieti in the Chieti Museum of Biomedical Sciences

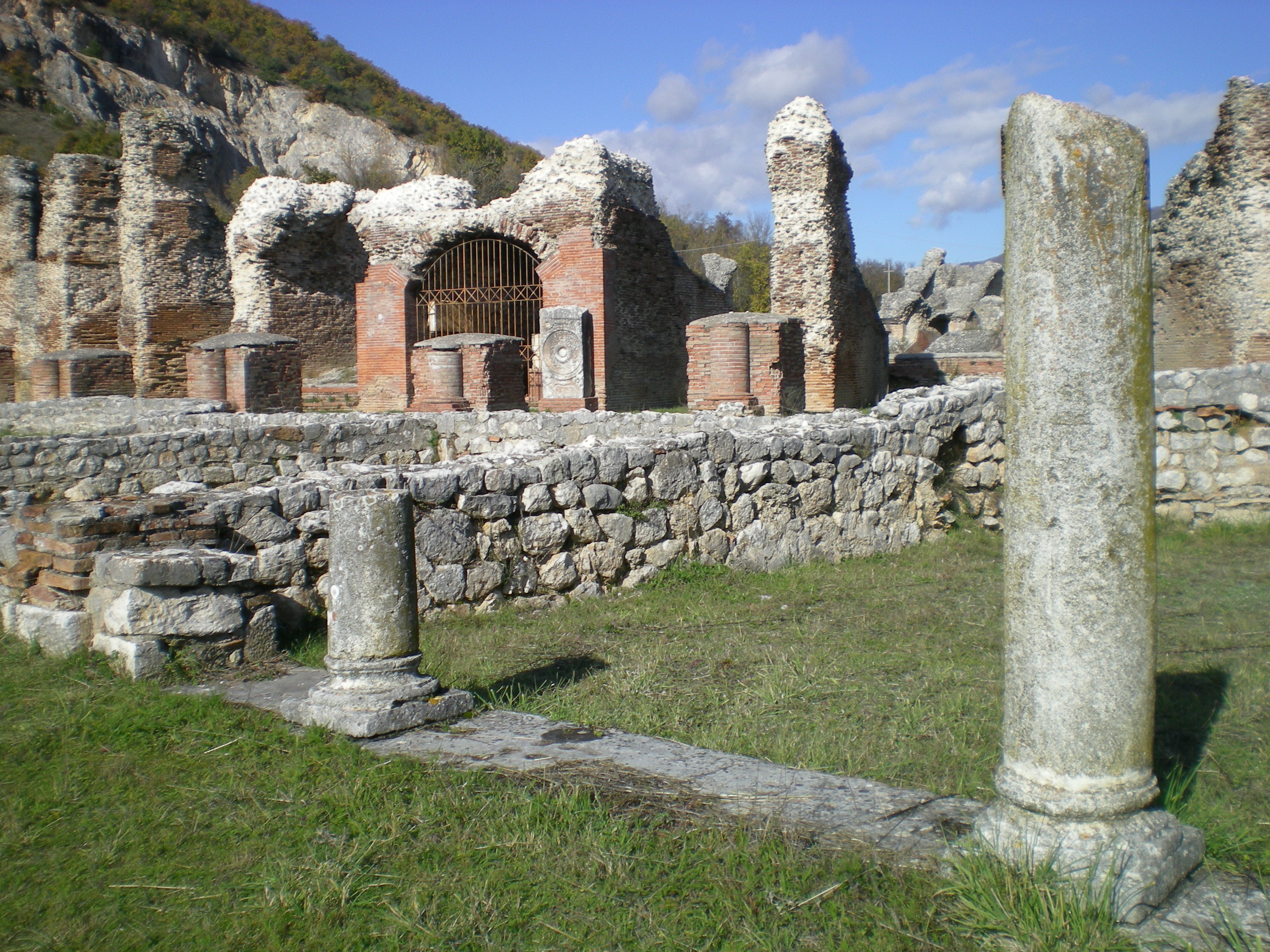
The Roman site Amiternum, located 9 km (5.6 mi) from L'Aquila

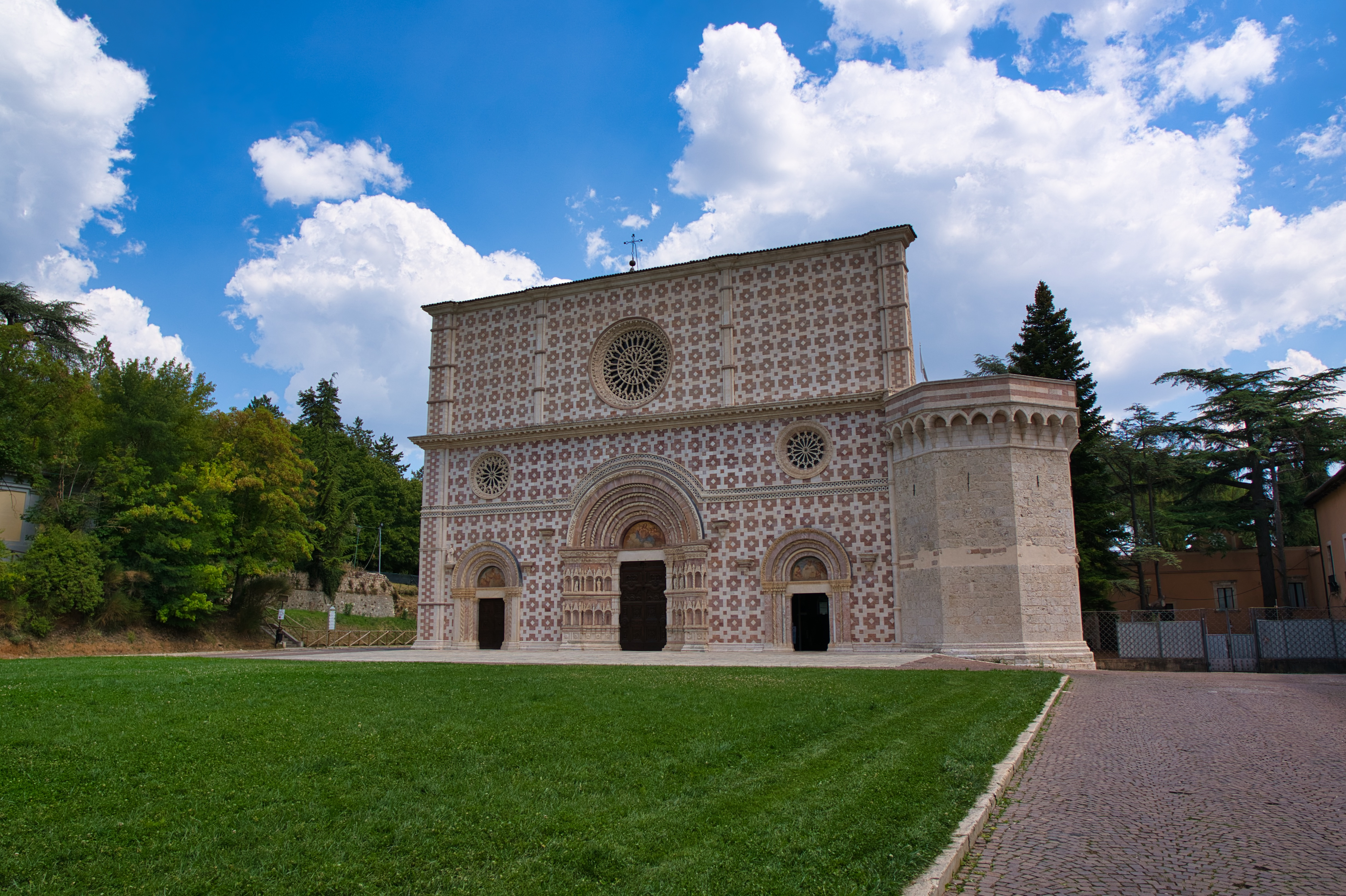
The church of Santa Maria di Collemaggio in L'Aquila, after the reconstruction in 2020

=== Prehistory ===
==== Paleolithic ====
Although an earlier presence cannot be ruled out, findings in the region related to archaic humans date from around 700,000 years ago (Acheulean Culture). Thousands of flint tools and weapons have been collected on fluvial terraces (e.g. Madonna del Freddo at Chieti) and near former lakes (e.g. Valle Giumentina at Caramanico Terme and Valle Peligna at Popoli). These testify to the presence of different Homo species over time, ranging from Homo erectus and Neanderthals to modern humans. A site located at Popoli (Svolte di Popoli) also contained hippopotamus bones. The most important evidence of Neanderthals' presence in the region was found in caves in Calascio and dates back to the Middle Paleolithic.

Significant evidence of Upper Paleolithic human populations has been found in various places, including the Fucino depression and Montebello di Bertona, the latter giving its name to a distinctive stoneworking technique called "Bertonian".

==== Neolithic ====
After the Mesolithic transition, which was characterized by climate change and a lack of food resources, agriculture was introduced in Abruzzo by Neolithic farmers from the Middle East. A skeleton from Lama dei Peligni in the province of Chieti was dated back to 6,540 BC using radiometric dating.

In Abruzzo and Marche, villages typical of the Ripoli culture in the 5–6th millennium BC consisted of huts, and were generally located on fluvial terraces or hills overlooking rivers. In some cases, they were defended by a moat. Caves were often used for rituals. These people practiced agriculture, husbandry, hunting, fishing, and production of pottery, which was painted or decorated. Other older Neolithic cultures present in Abruzzo are called the Impressed Ceramic culture and the Catignano culture.

==== Metal Ages ====
The Bronze Age saw the spread of the Apennine culture and the Subapennine culture in central-southern Italy, including in Abruzzo. The former has been associated with pastoralism, and the latter with agriculture. During the Late Bronze Age, the Proto-Villanovan culture emerged in Abruzzo.

There are sites of Iron Age necropoli at Fiorano (Loreto Aprutino's frazione), Campovalano (Campli), Alfedena, and Capestrano.

=== Ancient history ===
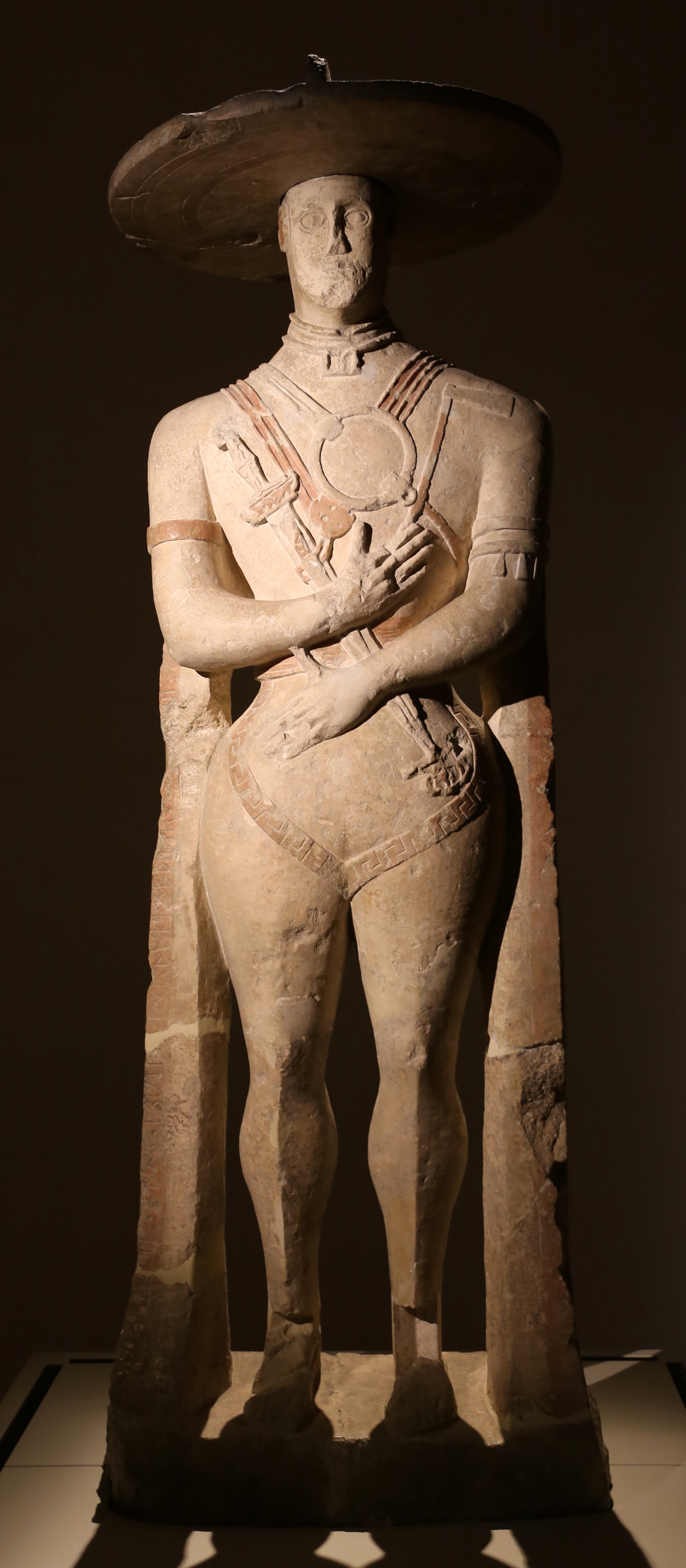
Warrior of Capestrano is the most famous example of Abruzzi Italic funerary sculpture (Museo Archeologico Nazionale d'Abruzzo, Chieti).

At the end of the Iron Age, Abruzzo was inhabited by different tribes, including the peoples defined by ancient Roman tradition as Sabelli: Oscan-speaking Pentri, Carricini, and Frentani, and, more generically, the Osco-Umbrian Aequi, Praetutii, Vestini, Marrucini, Marsi, and Paeligni.

Considered strong warriors by ancient writers, the tribes fought against the Romans in the Samnite Wars (from 343 to 290 BC). Some tribes accepted the alliance with the Romans, while others surrendered after the Samnite Wars. Following progressive Romanization, they supported the Romans and contributed to many victories in the 3rd and 2nd centuries BC. They fought again with Rome during the Social War (91–87 BC) to gain political rights and created the ephemeral state called Italia with Corfinio as the capital. After the Social War, they obtained Roman citizenship and in the Imperial period favoured economic activities such as trade and pastoralism. On the basis of a division by Augustus, the territory of what is now Abruzzo was part of "Regio V Picenum" and especially "Regio IV Sabina et Samnium". Much later, the region corresponded to the Valeria province, according to the Diocletian decisions, and was among the first to see the arrival of Christianity.

Evidence from archeological sites shows that many cities in Abruzzo date back to ancient times. Corfinio was known as Corfinium when it was the chief city of the Paeligni, and it became the capital of "Italia" against the Romans during the Social War. Today's Chieti has been inhabited since the Chalcolithic era, and was an important center for the Marrucini (Teate Marrucinorum). Atri was known as Hatria and Teramo was known variously in ancient times as Interamnia and Teramne. Pinna (today Penne), Anxanum (Lanciano), Hortona (Ortona), Histonium (Vasto), Sulmona, and Marruvium (San Benedetto dei Marsi) are among the settlements that are still inhabited while others are no longer so, such as Cluviae near Casoli.

=== Middle Ages ===
==== Early Middle Ages ====
After the fall of the Western Roman Empire and the Gothic War between the Byzantine Empire and the Ostrogothic Kingdom, looting and devastation of monasteries and towns accompanied the arrival of Germanic Lombards in the region. Around 572, the Lombards divided Abruzzo into the Duchy of Benevento and that of Spoleto, with the Faroald I of Spoleto becoming the first Duke of Spoleto. His successor, Ariulf of Spoleto, annexed other territories: the former territories controlled by the Aequi, Marsi, Peligni, and Vestini. In the 8th century, Transamund II of Spoleto rebelled against Liutprand, King of the Lombards, but was able to recover his duchy and also to include other remaining territories of the former Valeria province.

After the beginning of domination by the Franks, in 801, Teate (today's Chieti) also passed from the Lombardic Duchy of Benevento to the Frankish Duchy of Spoleto. In 843, some territories were separated from the duchy (all the region together with the district of Rieti, except that of Teramo, according to Liber provincialis), with Celano as the capital. Counts of Marsi from different lineages ruled "Marsia" from 843 to 926. In 871, Louis II of Italy founded, as the Carolingian Emperor, a monastery, which would become very powerful in the history of Abruzzo (Abbey of San Clemente a Casauria). With the rule of Hugh of Italy from 926, the territories were divided: Penne and Teate to Atto I, and today's province of L'Aquila to Berardo.

==== Kingdom of Sicily ====
After two attempted conquests by two Norman princes of Capua in Abruzzo, two other Normans, Robert Guiscard and Robert I of Loritello, conquered Teate, Valva, and Penne. Later, all of Abruzzo was definitively conquered by Norman Roger II of Sicily. In 1156, his son, William I of Sicily, had these victories officially recognized by Pope Adrian IV.

As part of the Kingdom of Sicily, Abruzzo was involved in the conflicts following the death of William II of Sicily in 1189. The territories sided with Constance, Queen of Sicily and Henry VI, Holy Roman Emperor, but after the death of the former in 1198, they were invaded by Otto IV, Holy Roman Emperor. They were also involved in the conflicts between Frederick II (son of Queen Constance) and Pope Gregory IX, including the War of the Keys. Following this, the administrative region of Abruzzo was formed in the 1230s, when Frederick II divided his realms into justiciarates, with Abruzzo forming one of them.

The newly founded L'Aquila was destroyed by Manfred, King of Sicily (son of Frederick II) in 1259, and in the Battle of Tagliacozzo (1268), supported the defeat of his nephew Conradin against Charles I of Anjou, the new king of Sicily. From the last half of the 13th century, L'Aquila took a central role in the region. Abruzzo was divided into Abruzzo Citra (nearer Abruzzo) and Abruzzo Ultra (further Abruzzo) by Charles I of Anjou in the 1270s.

=== Kingdom of Naples ===
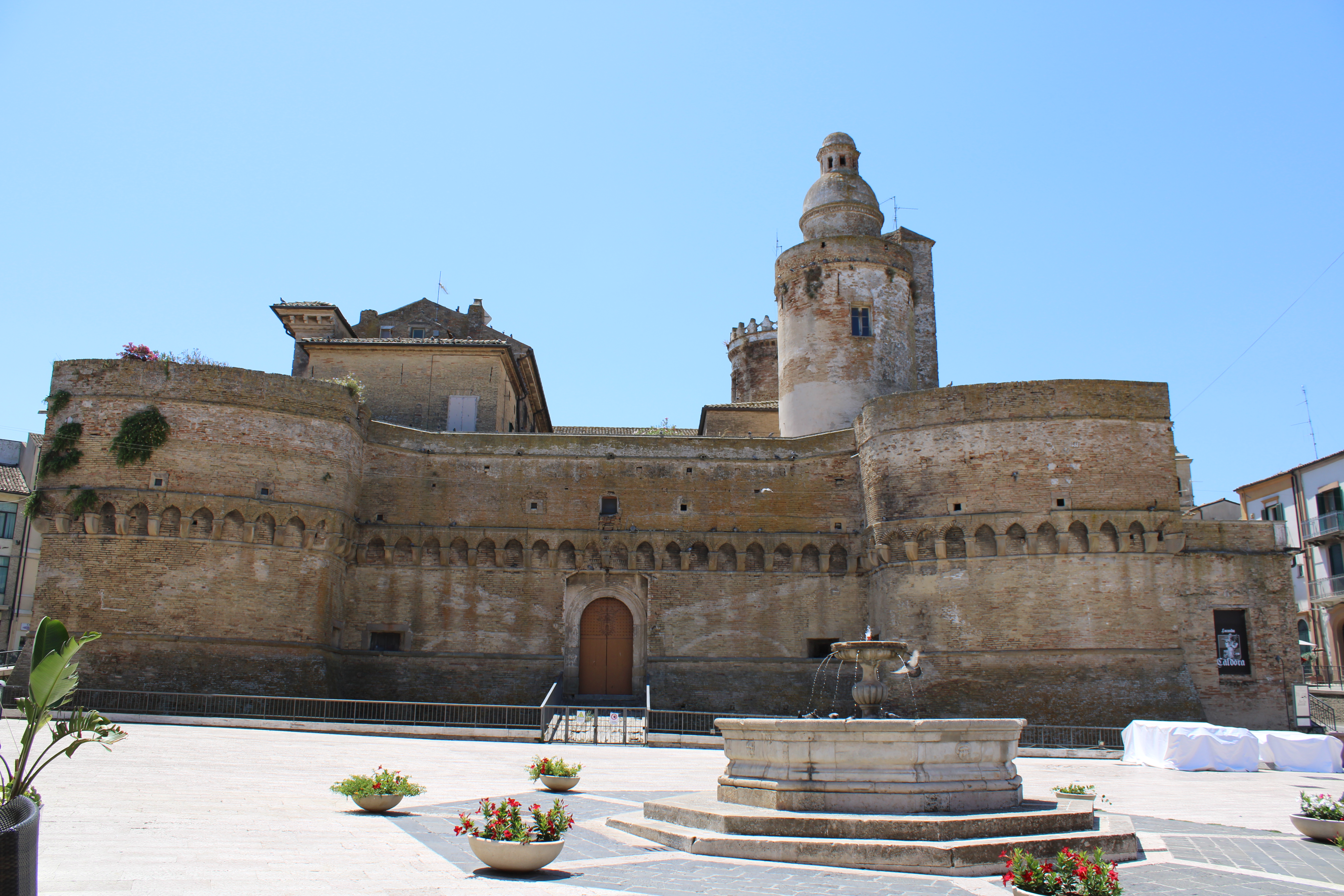
Castello Caldoresco, Vasto

In 1302, after the rebellion called Sicilian Vespers and the subsequent war, the Peace of Caltabellotta divided the former Kingdom of Sicily as follows: Sicily to the Crown of Aragon and the Southern Italian Peninsula (including Abruzzo) still to the Capetian House of Anjou.

The region was profoundly affected during the wars that followed a conspiracy which resulted in the assassination of Andrew, Duke of Calabria, the husband of Queen Joanna I of Naples. Different towns (L'Aquila, Penne, Chieti, Lanciano, Ortona) sided at first with the brother of the victim, Louis I of Hungary. In 1443, Alfonso V of Aragon, King of Sicily, conquered the Kingdom of Naples. In the decades that followed, Abruzzo saw many battles, including the ones associated with the War of L'Aquila. Under the Aragonese rulers, L'Aquila started to become a military center, giving up its political and economic importance to Chieti. This period was characterized by economic decline and the spread of brigandage, but coastal centers benefited from trade with the Republic of Venice's overseas territories.

Shortly after the Italian War of 1494–1495 carried out by Charles VIII of France, the Kingdom of Naples returned to Ferdinand II of Aragon. In this and in the following conflict between the Kingdom of France and the Kingdom of Spain over the Kingdom of Naples, Abruzzo sided with France, but Spain won in 1503 and started to dominate the Kingdom of Naples with its viceroys.

In Abruzzo, the aristocracy tried to regain more control when there was a rebellion in the Kingdom of Naples led by a fisherman named Masaniello in 1647.

At the beginning of the 18th century, the region was affected by destructive earthquakes, which also devastated L'Aquila (1703 Apennine earthquakes) and Sulmona (1706 Abruzzo earthquake), and the War of the Spanish Succession, with the Austrian siege at Pescara in 1707. In 1734, Charles III of the House of Bourbon, King of Spain, ended the short Habsburg Austrian domination, which contributed to large land concentrations in Abruzzo.

=== French invasions ===
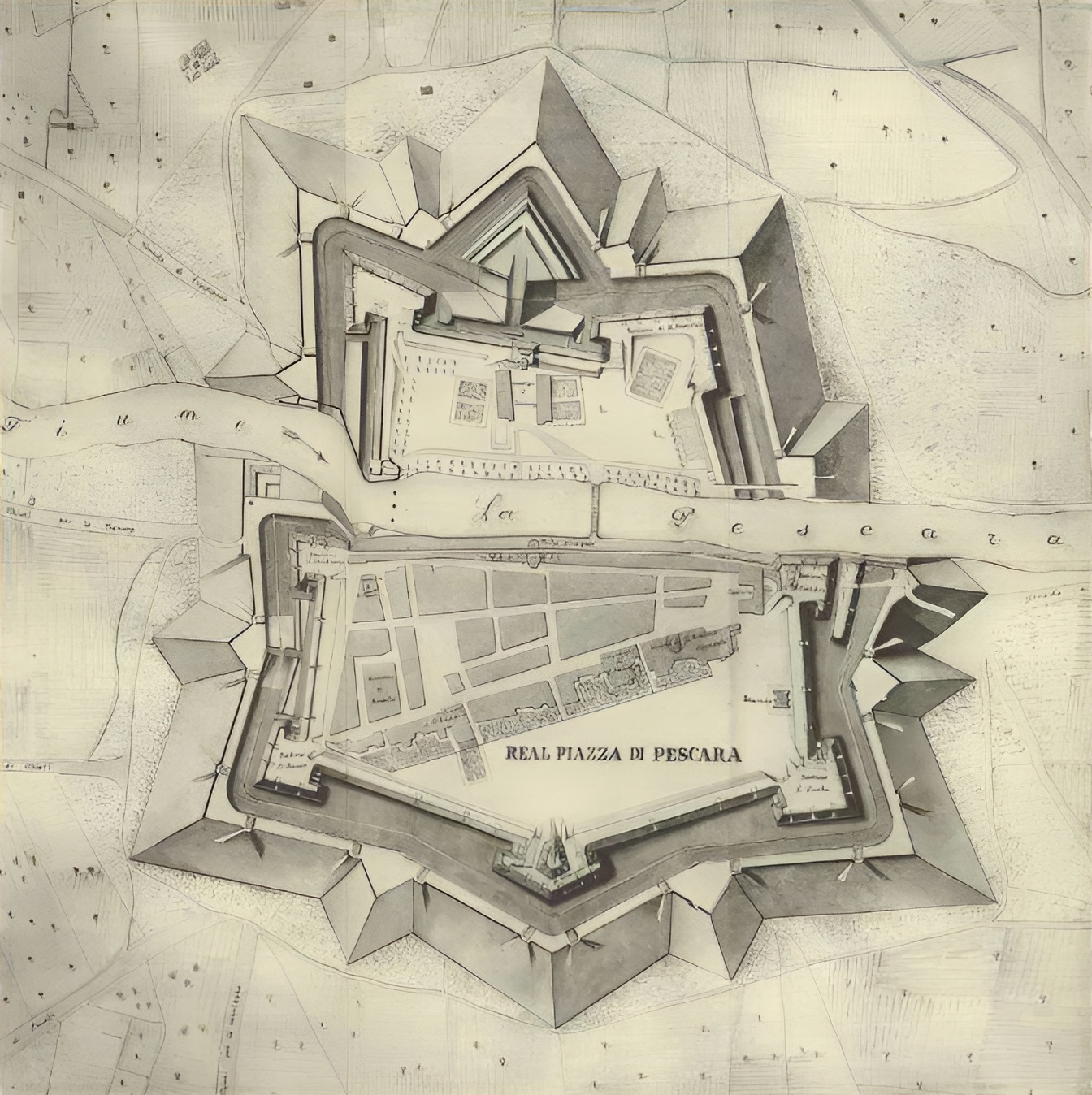
The former Pescara fortress, once a northern defensive stronghold for the Kingdom of Naples, demolished in the late XIX century.

In accordance with a general diffidence against the Enlightenment ideas, the Abruzzo population of different social classes rebelled in an improvised way against French invasion in 1798 and 1799. After the proclamation of the ephemeral Parthenopean Republic, they continued to be hostile to French invaders (Sanfedismo).

During the client kingdom (1806–1815) of Napoleon, in 1806, Abruzzo Ultra was divided into two, as Abruzzo Ultra I and Abruzzo Ultra II, divided at the Gran Sasso d'Italia; the same Citra/Ultra I/Ultra II scheme was used for Calabria.

=== Kingdom of Two Sicilies ===
The return of the Bourbons was granted by the Congress of Vienna, while Abruzzo was plagued by decline and brigandage. The House of Bourbon-Two Sicilies established the Kingdom of the Two Sicilies in 1816, and ruled until Italian unification (also known as the Risorgimento).

=== Italian unification ===
Rebellions also sprang up in 1821, 1841 and 1848 with a variety of causes, including liberal, Jacobin, or reactionary ideas. During the unification of Italy, in 1860, Abruzzo became part of the Kingdom of Sardinia and, in 1861, the Kingdom of Italy. Some supporters of the Bourbons fought against volunteers of Garibaldi, and later banded together with common criminals to participate for political reasons in brigandage, which would be eradicated years later. However, many accepted the new order with neither enthusiasm nor opposition.

Since 1870, due to its economic conditions, Abruzzo saw massive emigration to other regions and countries, which contributed to the Italian diaspora.

=== Fascism and World War II ===
During the Italian fascism period, Pescara became an important center for its homonymous port, tourism, and trade. With the Second World War, Abruzzo was on the Gustav Line, part of the German Winter Line. One of the most brutal battles was the Battle of Ortona. Abruzzo was the location of two prisoner-of-war camps, Campo 21 in Chieti, and Campo 78 in Sulmona. The Sulmona camp had also served as a POW camp in World War I; much of the facility is still intact and attracts tourists.

=== Italian Republic ===
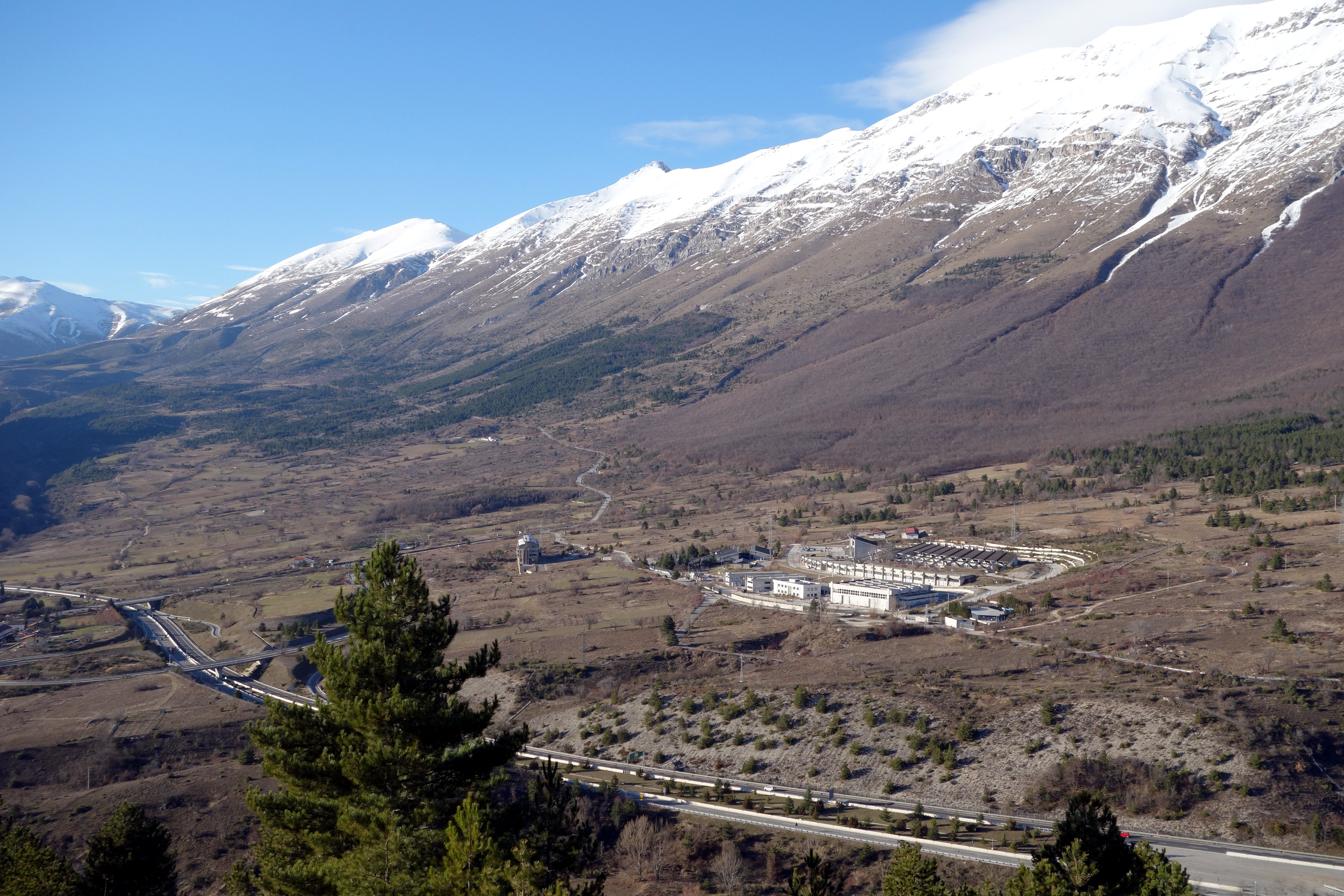
Administrative buildings of INFN's Gran Sasso underground research center and highway A24 near Assergi, L'Aquila.

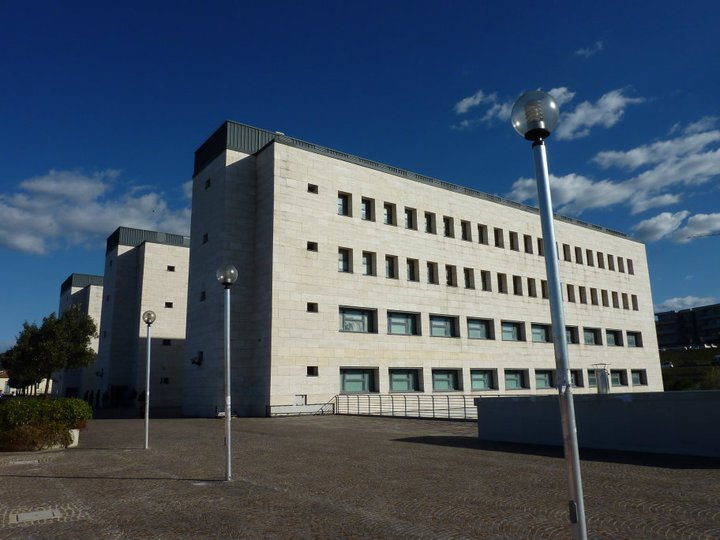
Gabriele d'Annunzio University in Chieti

Despite the high level of destruction and victims caused by the Second World War, there was remarkable development in the second half of the 20th century, which particularly favored the Fucino and Adriatic coastal areas. Indeed, starting from 1964, Abruzzo started to be affected by a late economic miracle, with a historical increase in consumption and investment. There was rapid industrialisation of different areas of the region, especially Val Vibrata in the Province of Teramo, and Val Pescara and Val di Sangro, both located in the Province of Chieti. By 1981, Abruzzo had a higher level of industrialization than some Central-Northern regions and was in evident contrast with other Southern regions.

In the 1960s, L'Aquila established the University of L'Aquila, whereas Chieti, Pescara and Teramo founded the Gabriele d'Annunzio University, which became a state-funded university in 1982. In 1993, the University of Teramo was split from the Gabriele d'Annunzio University.

Owing to geographic rivalry between L'Aquila located in the mountainous area, and Pescara and Chieti located in the Adriatic area, the decision was made in 1966 to construct two parallel east-west motorways: Autostrada A24 and Autostrada A25. In particular, the Autostrada A24 resulted in the expensive construction of the Gran Sasso tunnel, which also hosts the Laboratori Nazionali del Gran Sasso, a prominent underground particle physics research center.

In the 1948 Italian Constitution, Abruzzo was unified with Molise into the Abruzzi e Molise region, though in the first draft, Abruzzo and Molise were separate. In 1963, Abruzzi e Molise was separated into the two regions of Abruzzo and Molise.

The decision concerning the location of regional headquarters was influenced by the rivalry between L'Aquila and Pescara, which was in turn affected by the rivalry between Lorenzo Natali's and Remo Gaspari's factions inside the Christian Democracy majority party. In the 1970s, this caused street protests and riots in both cities and the decision to place some headquarters in Pescara outside the capital L'Aquila.

The province of Teramo and province of Pescara now comprise the territory of the former Abruzzo Ulteriore I. Abruzzo Ulteriore II is now the province of L'Aquila. Abruzzo Citeriore is now the province of Chieti.

== Geography ==
Geographically, Abruzzo is located in a roughly central position on the Italian Peninsula, stretching from the heart of the Apennines to the Adriatic Sea, and is characterized by mainly mountainous and wild land. The mountainous area features a vast plateau, with Gran Sasso, which, at 2,912 metres (9,554 ft), is the highest peak of the Apennines, and Mount Majella at 2,793 metres (9,163 ft). The Adriatic coastline is characterized by long sandy beaches to the north and pebbly beaches to the south. Abruzzo is known for its landscapes and natural environment, parks and nature reserves, and characteristic hillside areas rich in vineyards and olive groves. Many beaches have been awarded the Blue Flag beach status.

=== Climate ===
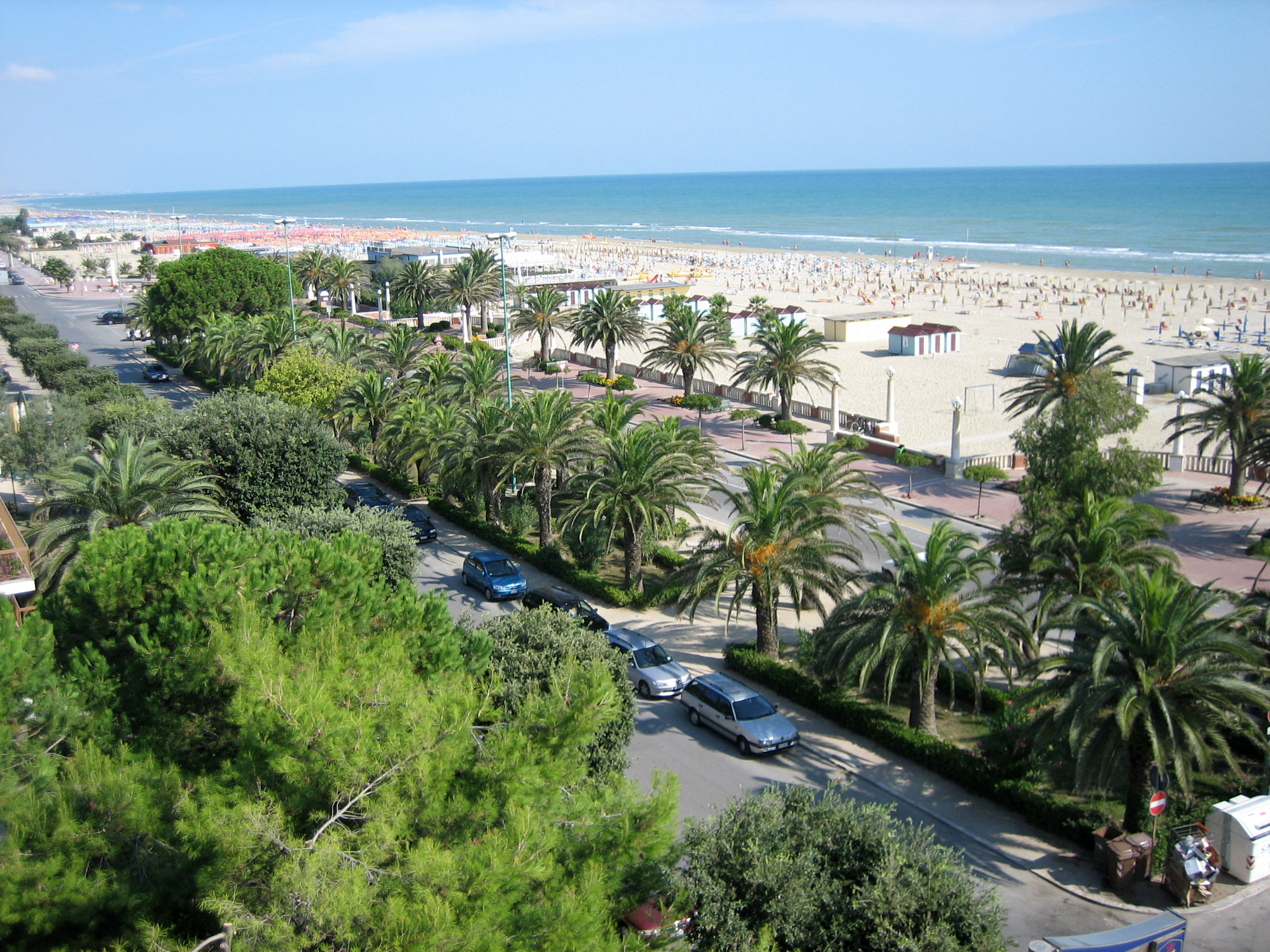
Giulianova seaside

There are two climatic zones in Abruzzo. The coastal strip and sub-Apennine hills have a climate distinct from that of the mountainous interior. Coastal areas have a Mediterranean climate with hot dry summers and mild winters. Inland hilly areas have a sublittoral climate with temperatures decreasing with altitude. Precipitation is also strongly affected by the presence of the Apennines mountain range. Rainfall is abundant on slopes oriented to the west, and lower in the east and on east-facing slopes. The Adriatic coast is shielded from rainfall by the barrier effect created by the Apennines. The minimum annual rainfall is found in some inland valleys sheltered by mountain ranges, such as the Peligna or Tirino valleys (near Ofena, Capestrano), annual rainfall as low as 500 millimetres (19.7 inches) has been recorded. Rainfall along the coast almost never falls below 600 millimetres (23.6 inches). Pescara has relatively less rainfall (about 700 millimetres (27.6 inches)) than Chieti (about 1,000 millimetres (39.4 inches)). The highest rainfall occurs in upland areas on the border with Lazio; these areas are especially vulnerable to Atlantic disturbances. Around 1,500 to 2,000 millimetres (59 to 79 inches) of precipitation is typical.

=== Flora and fauna ===
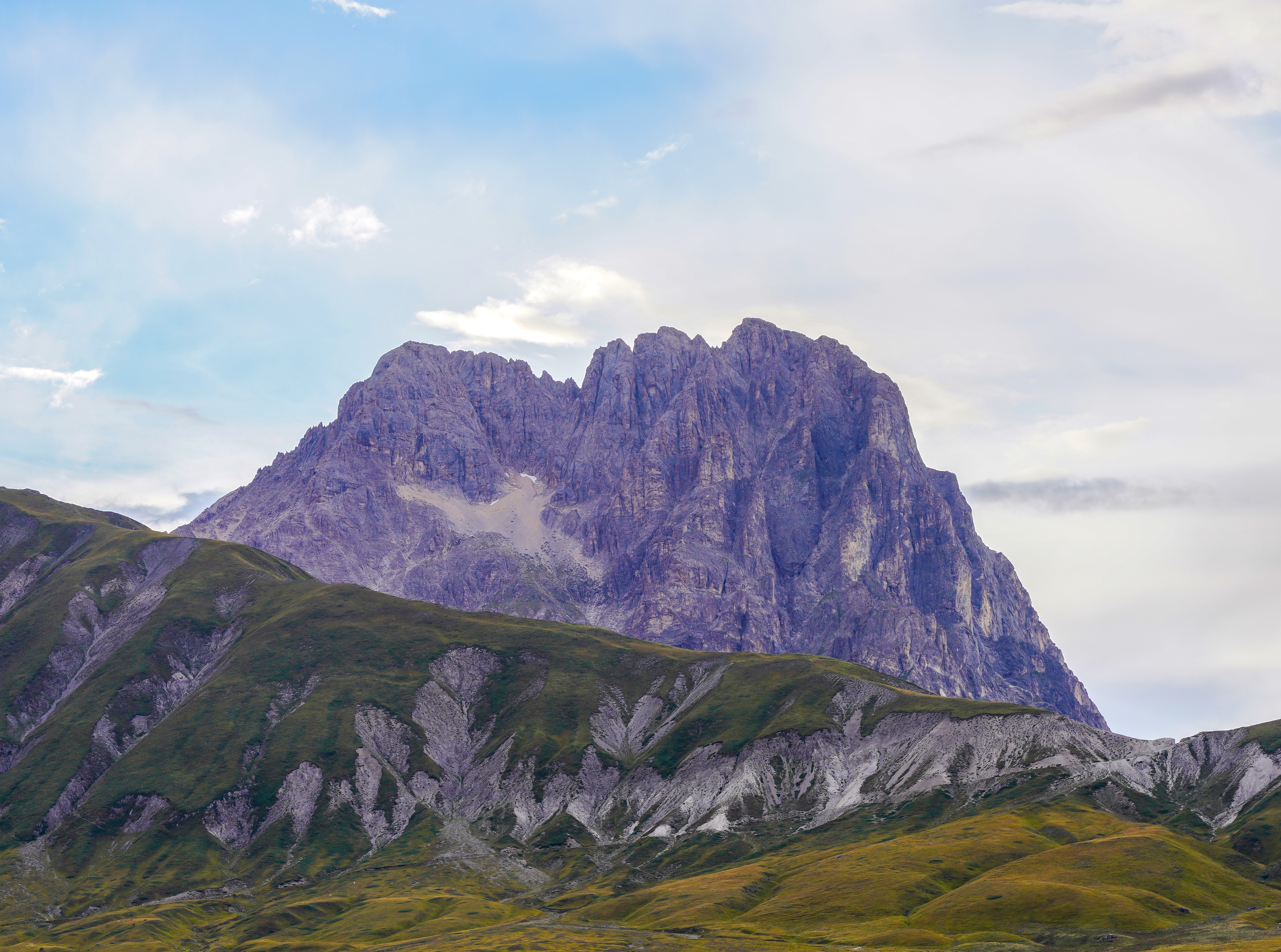
Gran Sasso d'Italia

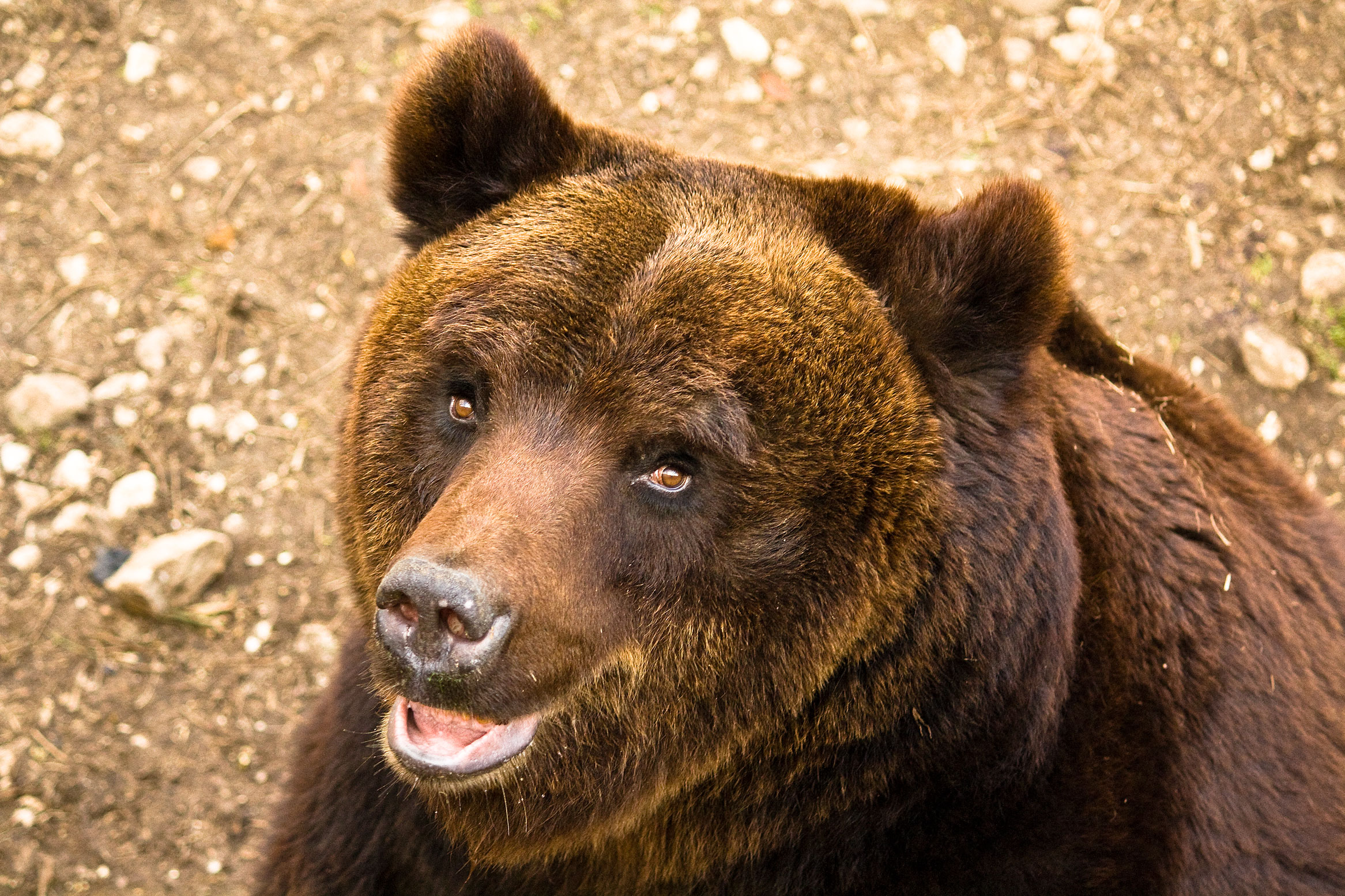
Marsican brown bear

The flora of Abruzzo is typically Mediterranean. Along the coastal belt, Mediterranean shrubland is the dominant natural vegetation, with species including myrtle, heather, and mastic. Inland, there are olive, pine, willow, oak, poplar, alder, arbutus, broom, acacia, capers, rosemary, hawthorn, licorice, and almond trees, interspersed with oak trees. At elevations between 600 and 1,000 metres (2,000 and 3,300 ft), there is sub-montane vegetation, with mixed woodlands of oak and turkey oak, maple, and hornbeam; shrubs include dog rose and red juniper. Elevations between 1,000 and 1,900 metres (3,300 and 6,200 ft) are dominated by beech. In the Apennine Mountains, at elevations above 2,000 metres (6,600 ft), species include alpine orchid, mountain juniper, silver fir, black cranberry, and the Abruzzo edelweiss.

The fauna of Abruzzo is very diverse, including the region's symbol, the Abruzzo chamois (Rupicapra pyrenaica ornata), which has recovered from near-extinction. Common species include the Marsican brown bear, Italian wolf, red deer, lynx, roe deer, snow vole, fox, porcupine, wild cat, wild boar, badger, otter, and viper.

The natural parks of the region are the Abruzzo National Park, the Gran Sasso and Monti della Laga National Park, the Maiella National Park, and the Sirente-Velino Regional Park, as well as many other natural reserves and protected areas.

In 2017, the ancient beech forests of the Abruzzo Lazio and Molise National Park of Europe were recognized as a World Heritage Site by UNESCO, a designation which gave the region its first prestigious site.

== Government ==
Abruzzo is governed as a presidential style representative democracy with a multi-party system. Executive power is exercised by the Regional Government. Legislative power is vested in both the government and the regional council.

The Regional Government (Giunta regionale) is presided over by the president of the region (presidente della Regione), who is elected for a five-year term. The government is composed of the President and the eight ministers (assessori), including the Vice President (Vicepresidente) and an Undersecretary (Sottosegretario).

=== Administrative divisions ===
Abruzzo provinces

Abruzzo is divided into 4 provinces:

Province	Population (2026)	Area (km^{2})	Density (inh./km^{2})	Capital	Municipalities
Chieti	369,059	2,599.58	142.0	Chieti	142.0
L'Aquila	286,765	5,047.55	56.8	L'Aquila	56.8
Pescara	311,563	1,230.33	253.2	Pescara	253.2
Teramo	299,835	1,954.38	153.4	Teramo	153.4

== Demographics ==
Historical population
Year	Pop.	±%
1861	858,424	—
1871	906,001	+5.5%
1881	946,430	+4.5%
1901	1,070,361	+13.1%
1911	1,116,497	+4.3%
1921	1,131,087	+1.3%
1931	1,168,099	+3.3%
1936	1,201,536	+2.9%
1951	1,277,207	+6.3%
1961	1,206,266	−5.6%
1971	1,166,694	−3.3%
1981	1,217,791	+4.4%
1991	1,249,054	+2.6%
2001	1,262,392	+1.1%
2011	1,307,309	+3.6%
2021	1,275,950	−2.4%
Source: ISTAT

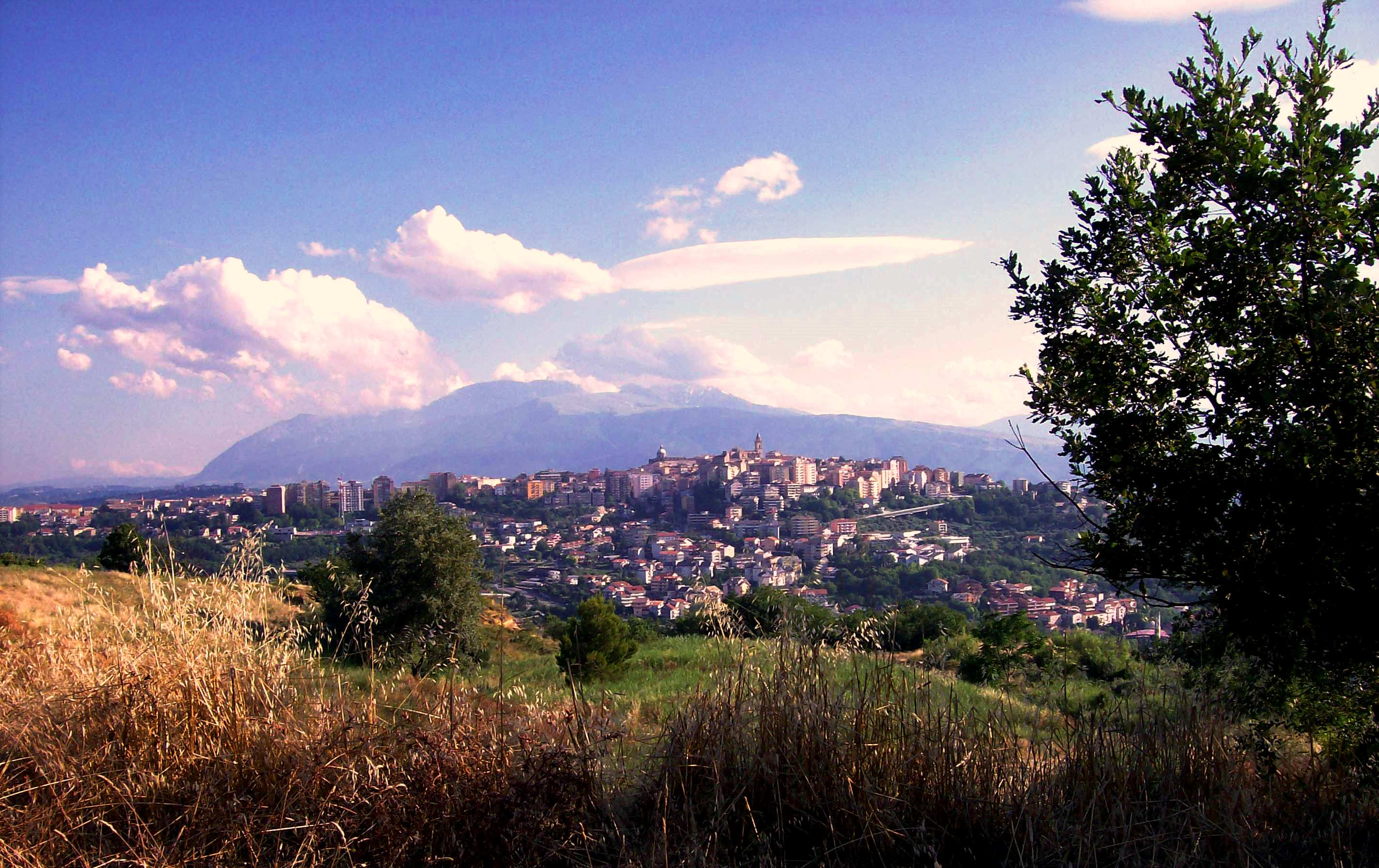
Chieti

As of 2026, the population is 1,267,222, of which 49.2% are male, and 50.8% are female. Minors make up 13.9% of the population, and seniors make up 26.5%.

As of 2026, with a population density of 117.0 people per km^{2}, the population density of Abruzzo is well below the national average of 195.1. Among the provinces, the density varies: Pescara is the most densely populated with 253.2 inhabitants per km^{2}, whereas L'Aquila is the least densely populated, with 56.8 inhabitants per km^{2}, although it has the largest area.

The most serious demographic imbalance is between the mountainous areas of the interior and the coastal strip. The largest province, L'Aquila, is situated entirely in the interior and has the lowest population density. The movement of the population of Abruzzo from the mountains to the sea has led to the almost complete urbanization of the entire coastal strip, especially in the province of Teramo and Chieti. The effects on the interior have been impoverishment and demographic aging, reflected by an activity rate in the province of L'Aquila which is the lowest among the provinces in Abruzzo – accompanied by geological degradation as a result of the absence of conservation measures.

In the coastal strip, there is such a dense concentration of accommodations and activities that the environment has been negatively affected. The policy of providing incentives for development has resulted in the setting-up of industrial zones, some of which (Vasto, Avezzano, Carsoli, Gissi, Val Vibrata, Val di Sangro) have made significant progress, while others (Val Pescara, L'Aquila) have run into trouble after their initial success. The zones of Sulmona and Guardiagrele have turned out to be more or less failures. Outside these zones, the main activities are agriculture and tourism. Despite these environmental pressures, in 2016, the Huffington Post placed Abruzzo in fifth position among the 12 best regions in the world for quality of life.

=== Immigration ===
Foreign population by country of birth (2025)
Country of birth	Population
Romania	20,360
Albania	15,205
Switzerland	10,884
Morocco	9,052
Venezuela	8,395
Germany	6,981
Ukraine	6,442
North Macedonia	3,831
Argentina	3,732
France	3,513
Belgium	3,375
Brazil	3,090
Bangladesh	3,069
China	2,878
Senegal	2,819

As of 2025, immigrants make up 11.6% of the population. The 5 largest foreign countries of birth are Romania, Albania, Switzerland, Morocco, and Venezuela.

After decades of emigration from the region, the main feature of the 1980s was immigration from developing countries. The recent population increase was due to the positive net migration.

== Economy ==
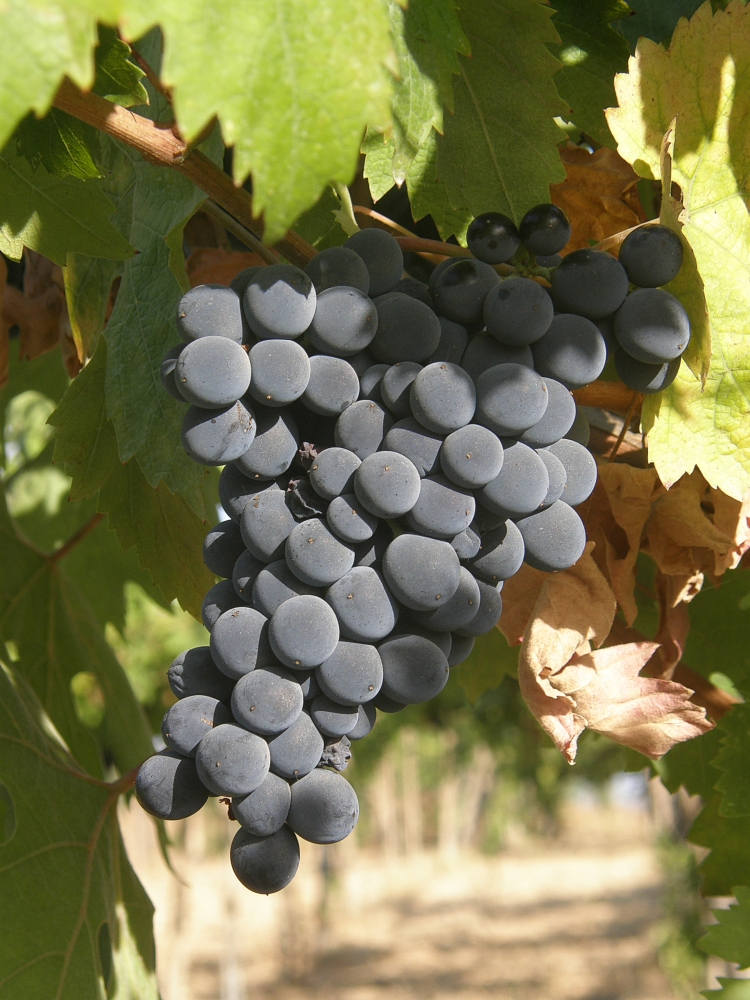
Montepulciano grapes

Until a few decades ago, Abruzzo was a backward region of Southern Italy. Since the 1950s, Abruzzo has shown steady economic growth. In 1951, the region's per capita income, or GDP, was only 53% of that of wealthier Northern Italy. The gap has since narrowed, being 65% in 1971 and 76% by 1994. The region achieved the highest per capita GDP in Southern Italy, alongside the highest growth rate in the country. The unemployment rate stood at 9.3% in 2020.

Abruzzo is the 16th most productive region in the country, and is the 15th for GRP per capita among Italian regions.

As of 2003, Abruzzo's per capita GDP was €19,506, or 84% of the national average of €23,181, compared to the average value for Southern Italy of €15,808. In 2006, the region's average GDP per capita was approximately 20,100 EUR. The construction of motorways from Rome to Teramo (A24) and Rome to Pescara (A25), which provided better access to the region, is credited as a driver of public and private investments.

The 2009 L'Aquila earthquake led to a sharp economic slowdown. However, according to statistics at the end of 2010, some signals of recovery were noted. Regional economic growth was recorded as 1.47%, which placed Abruzzo fourth among Italy's regions after Lazio, Lombardy, and Calabria. In 2011, Abruzzo's economic growth was +2.3%, making it the top-performing region in Southern Italy.

=== Industry ===
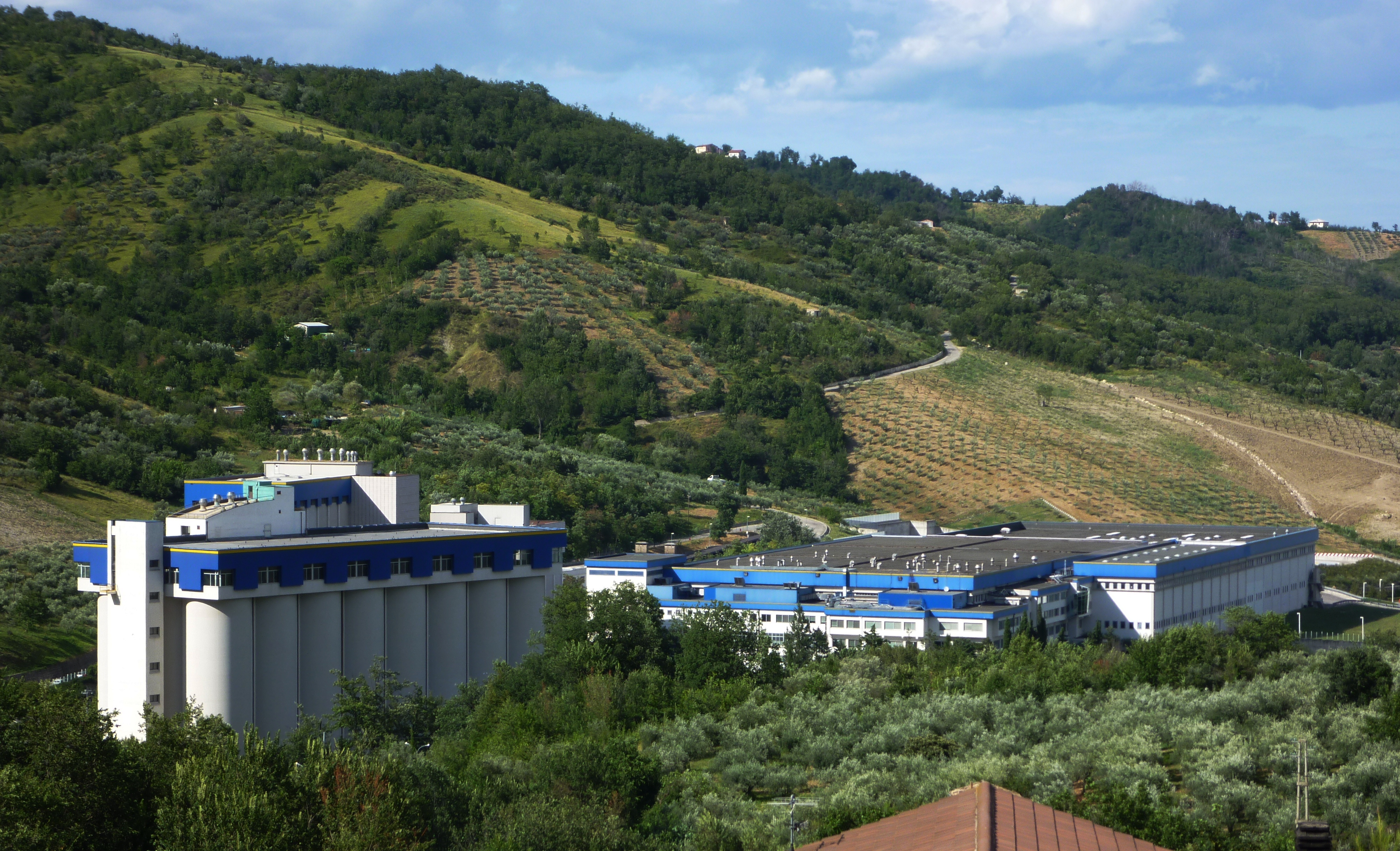
De Cecco factory in Fara San Martino

From the early 1950s to the mid-1990s, Abruzzo's industrial sector expanded rapidly, especially in mechanical engineering, transportation equipment, and telecommunications. The structure of production in the region reflects the transformation of the economy from agriculture to industry and services. The industrial sector relies on a few large enterprises and the predominance of small and medium ones. In the applied research field, there are major institutes and enterprises involved in the fields of pharmaceutics, biomedicine, electronics, aerospace, and nuclear physics. The industrial infrastructure is dispersed throughout the region in industrial zones. The most important of these are: Val Pescara, Val di Sangro, Val Trigno, Val Vibrata, and Conca del Fucino.

The province of Teramo is one of the most industrialized areas of Italy and of the region, with numerous small and medium-sized companies. It is followed by the province of Chieti and that of Pescara, which is also supported by tourism. The Val Vibrata (province of Teramo), on the border with the Marche region, is home to a myriad of small and medium-sized enterprises, especially in the textile and footwear sectors. The Val di Sangro (province of Chieti), on the other hand, is home to important multinationals and a factory belonging to the Fiat (Sevel) group. The area of Valle Peligna (province of L'Aquila) is home to the famous Sulmona sugared almond confectionery industry. Other areas, such as the Pescara and Chieti areas, are home to numerous industries, including multinationals such as De Cecco, Procter & Gamble, Monti & Ambrosini Editori, Brioni, Ennedue, and Miss Sixty, many of which are concentrated in the industrial district of Val Pescara, which spans parts of both the province of Pescara and the province of Chieti.

=== Agriculture ===
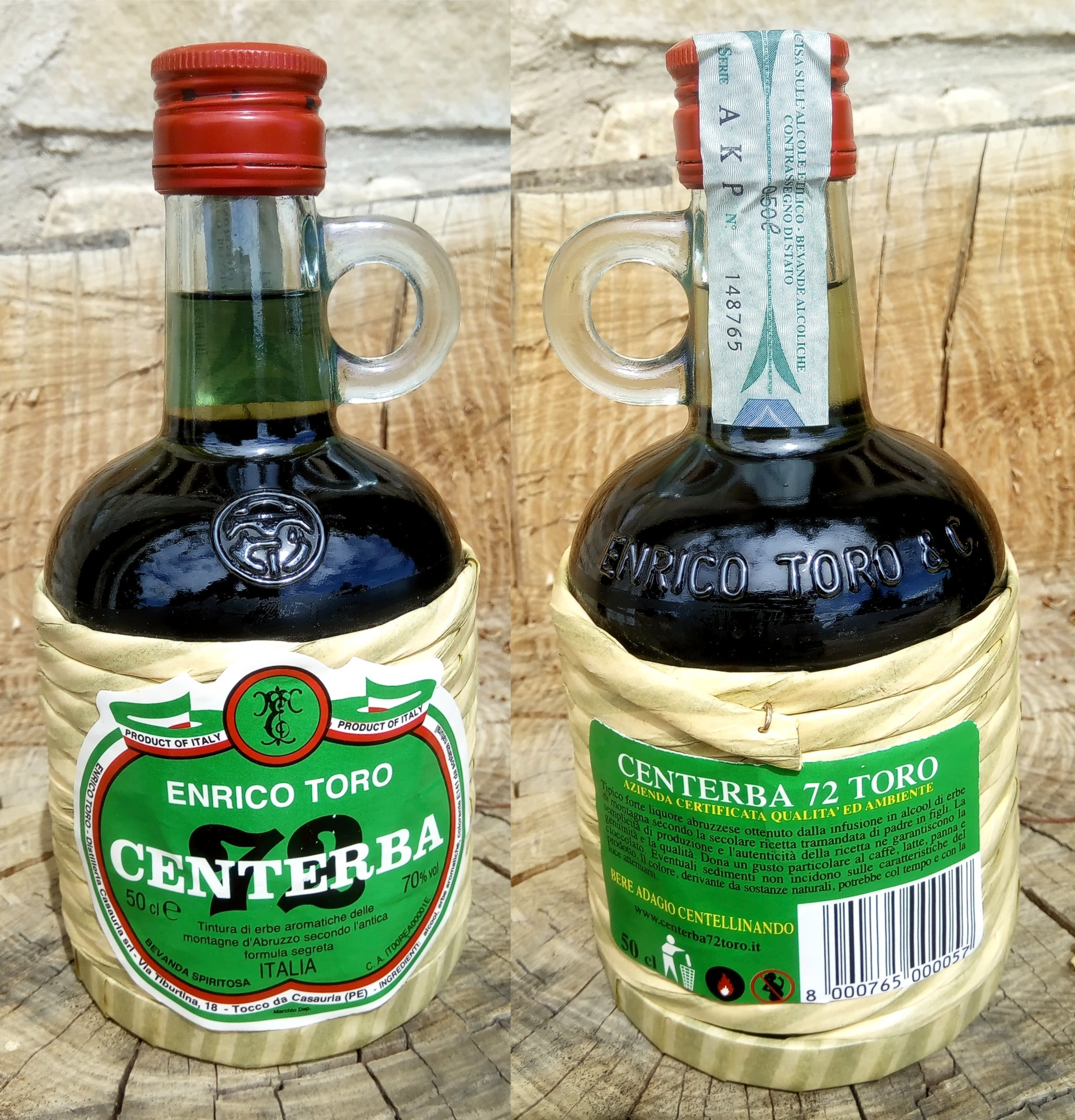
Centerba, typical liquor of Abruzzo

Agriculture, based on small holdings, has modernised and produces high-quality products. The mostly small-scale producers are active in wine, cereals, sugar beet, potatoes, olives, vegetables, fruit, and dairy products. Traditional products are saffron and liquorice. By the late 20th and early 21st centuries, Montepulciano d'Abruzzo, the region's most famous wine, had become one of the most widely exported DOC-classed wines in Italy.

The region produces about 850,000 quintals of fruit, 5 million quintals of vegetables, 1,600,000 quintals of potatoes, and 5,000,000 quintals of grapes, produced both for eating and for winemaking; the latter is estimated at between 3 and 4 million hectoliters, with the production of wines such as Montepulciano d'Abruzzo in the red and Cerasuolo (rosé) varieties, Trebbiano d'Abruzzo, Pecorino, and the Chardonnay; oil production, on the other hand, stands at 1,350,000 quintals of olives and 240,000 quintals of oil (Aprutino Pescarese, Pretuziano delle Colline Teramane and Colline Teatine), figures that put Abruzzo in sixth place among the Italian regions. As for cereals, the durum wheat with over 1.5 million quintals constitutes the main cereal, followed by soft wheat (one million quintals), then barley (0.5 million quintals ); other crops are also grown, among them beetroot (2,500,000 quintals) and tobacco (45,000 quintals).

=== Tourism ===
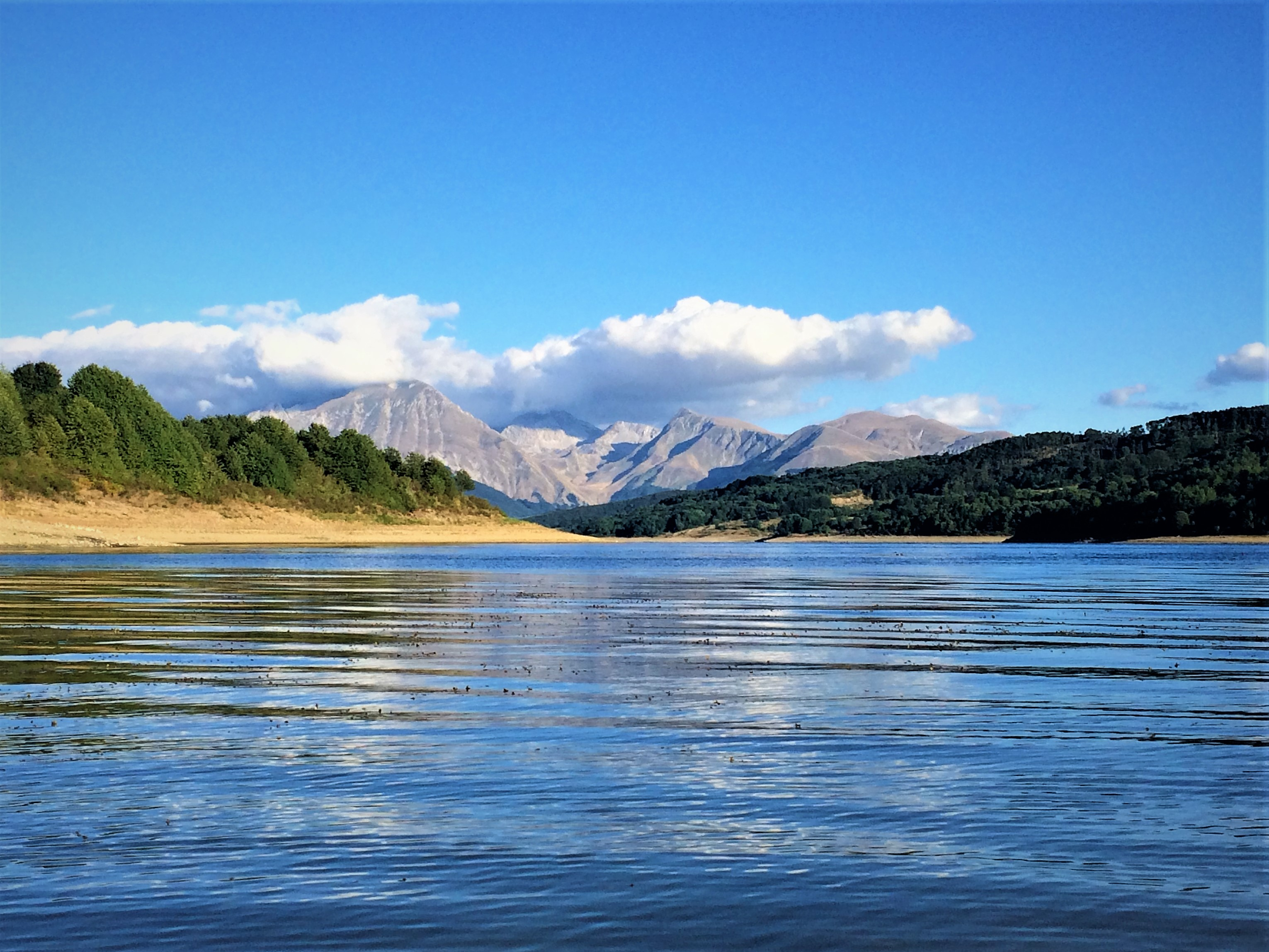
Campotosto Artificial Lake

Tourism is an important economic sector; in the past decade, tourism has increased, mainly centered on its national parks and natural reserves, ski and beach resorts, in particular along the Trabocchi Coast. Abruzzo's castles and medieval towns, especially in the area of L'Aquila, have led to the creation of the nickname of "Abruzzoshire", along Tuscany's "Chiantishire". In spite of this, Abruzzo is still "off the beaten path" for most visitors to Italy.

Very popular with visitors from all over Italy and Europe are the natural parks of the region, such as Parco Nazionale d'Abruzzo, Lazio e Molise, Gran Sasso e Monti della Laga National Park, Maiella National Park, and regional park Sirente Velino, which every year see thousands of visitors, who are attracted by the unspoiled nature and rare wild fauna and flora species such as Abruzzo chamois, with the region boasting many reserves and protected natural areas and lakes (Campotosto Lake and Lago di Scanno). In 2017, the ancient beech forests of the Abruzzo Lazio and Molise National Park were recognized as a UNESCO World Heritage Site, with the region thus gaining its first prestigious site.

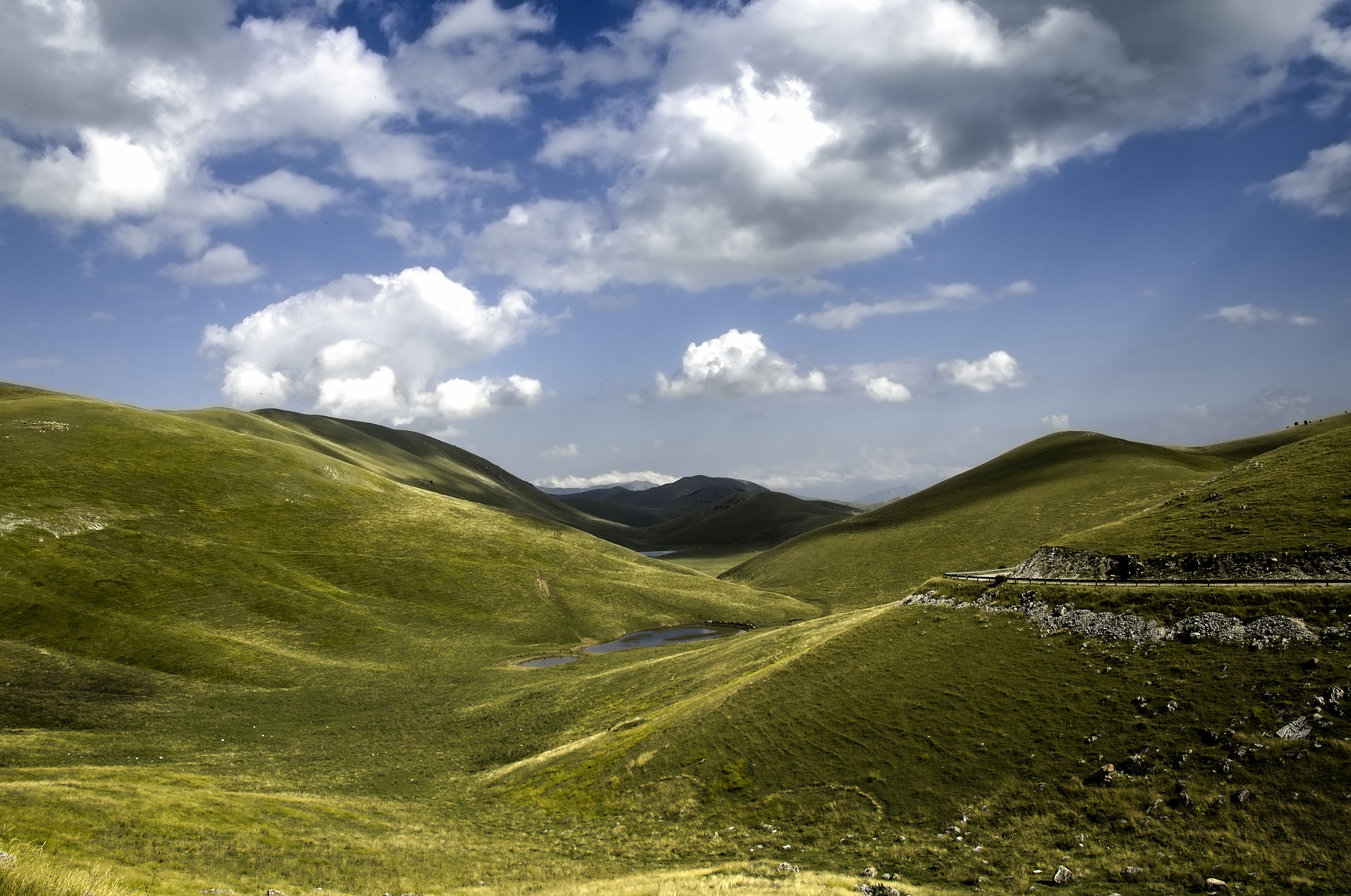
Gran Sasso e Monti della Laga National Park

In the inland mountain areas there are the ski resorts of Scanno, Ovindoli, Pescasseroli, Roccaraso, Campo Imperatore, Campo Felice, Rivisondoli, Pescocostanzo, and Pianoro Campitelli, where winter tourism is highly developed. Visitors engage in sports such as alpine skiing, snowboarding, ski mountaineering, ski touring, cross-country skiing, and dog sledding. Other trails and facilities are in Passolanciano-Majelletta, Campo Rotondo, Campo di Giove, Piani di Pezza, Voltigno, Centomonti, Macchiarvana, Monte Piselli.

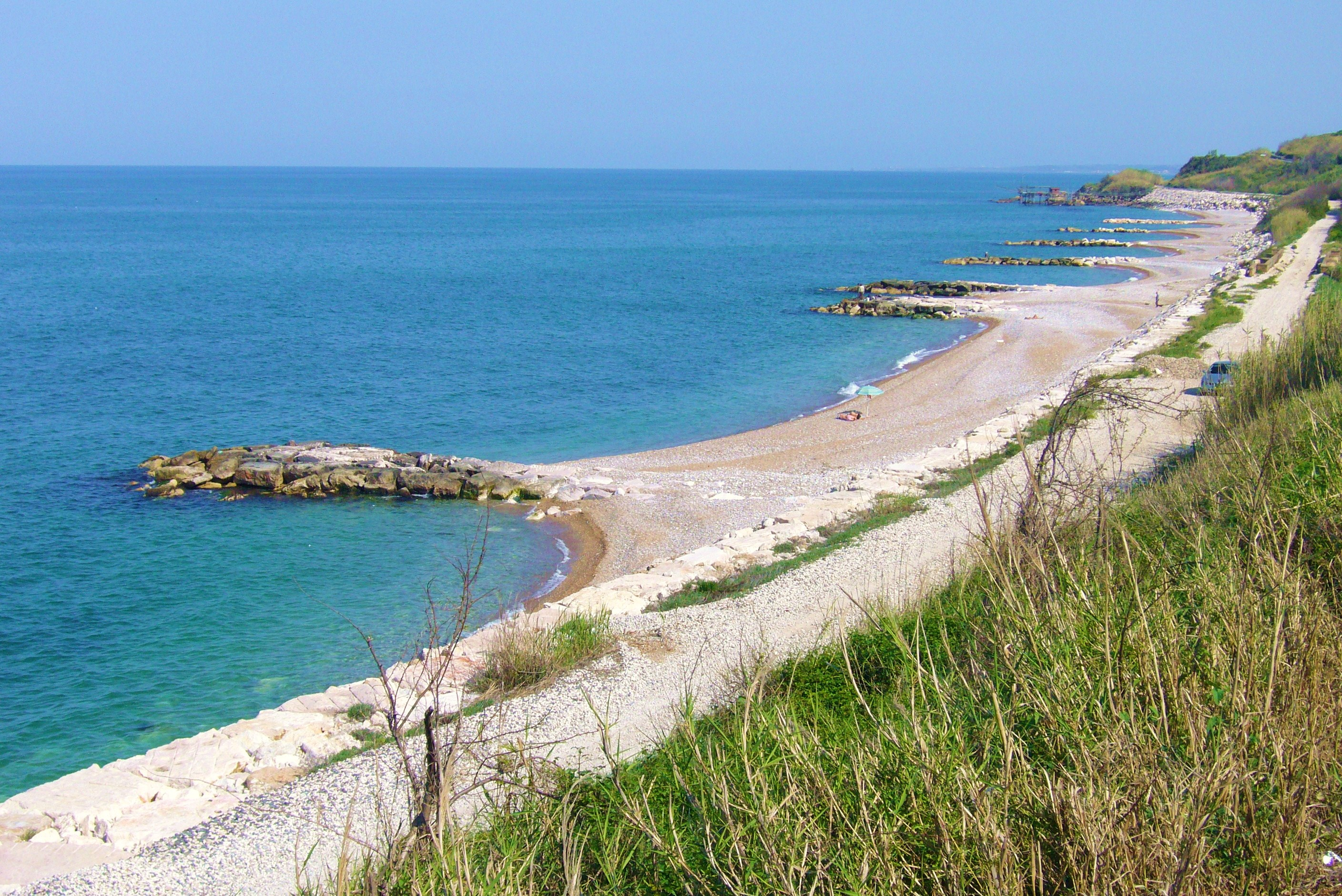
Trabocchi Coast, Fossacesia

Also of considerable importance is summer coastal and seaside tourism, which sees the presence of numerous tourist bathing establishments equipped in various centers of the coast such as Montesilvano, Pineto, Roseto degli Abruzzi, Giulianova, Alba Adriatica, Tortoreto, Francavilla al Mare, Ortona, Vasto, Martinsicuro, Silvi Marina, and the Trabocchi Coast.

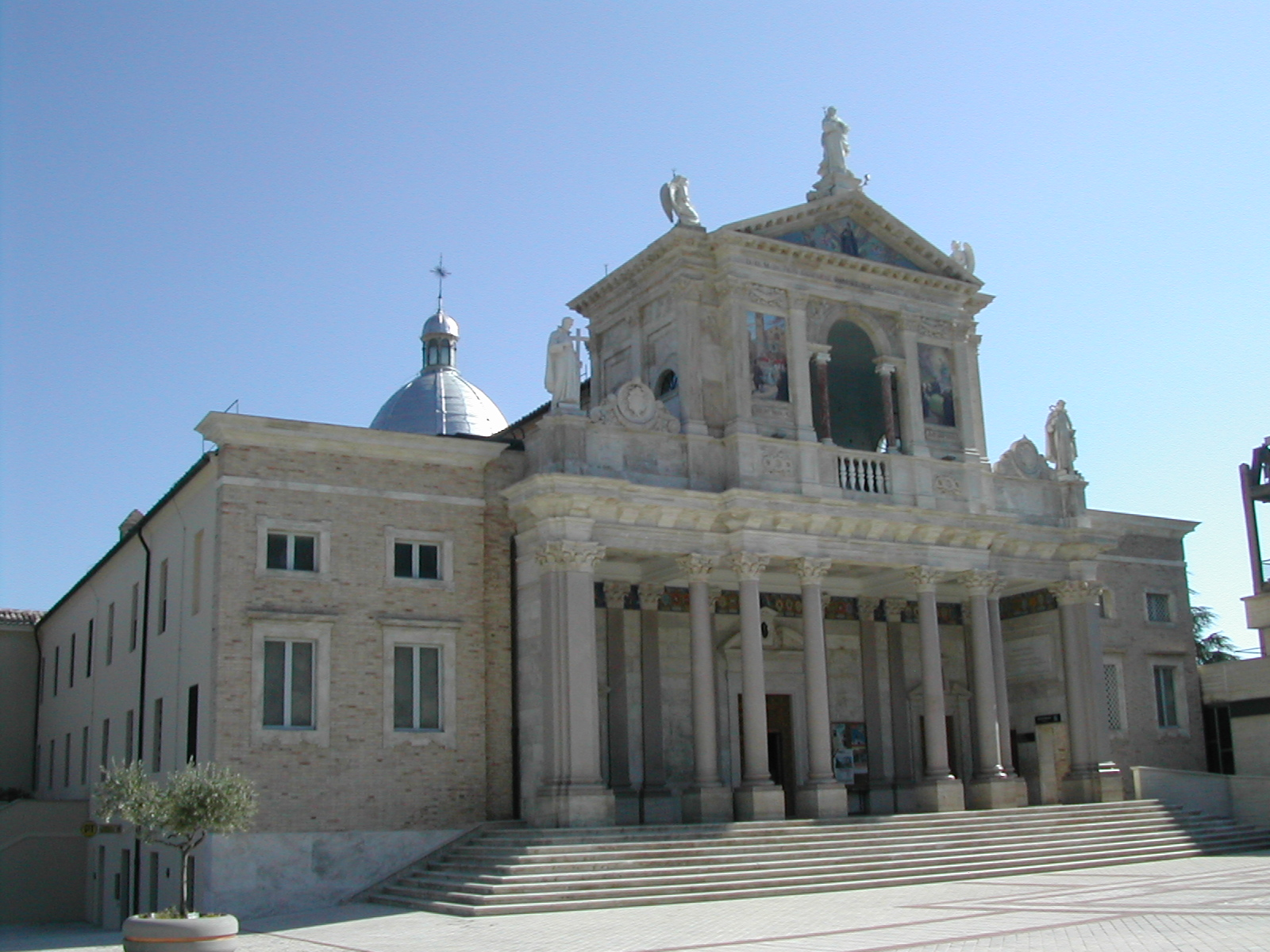
St. Gabriel's shrine

Finally, tourism for historical and cultural purposes is also important, concentrated above all in the cities of Lanciano, Chieti, Teramo, Vasto, Giulianova, Sulmona, and in particular L'Aquila, which boasts many monuments, museums, castles, and churches, among which St. Gabriel's shrine and Santa Maria di Collemaggio are of national importance. Pescara, despite being a modern city, boasts monuments, churches, and museums of historical importance such as the Birthplace of Gabriele D'Annunzio Museum. In the inland mountain areas, there are ancient villages, castles, hermitages, sanctuaries, abbeys, and ancient churches.

Travel poster from the 1920s

Abruzzo has many small and picturesque villages. 26 of them have been selected by I Borghi più belli d'Italia (English: The most beautiful Villages of Italy), a nonprofit private association of small Italian towns of strong historical and artistic interest, that was founded on the initiative of the Tourism Council of the National Association of Italian Municipalities. These villages are:

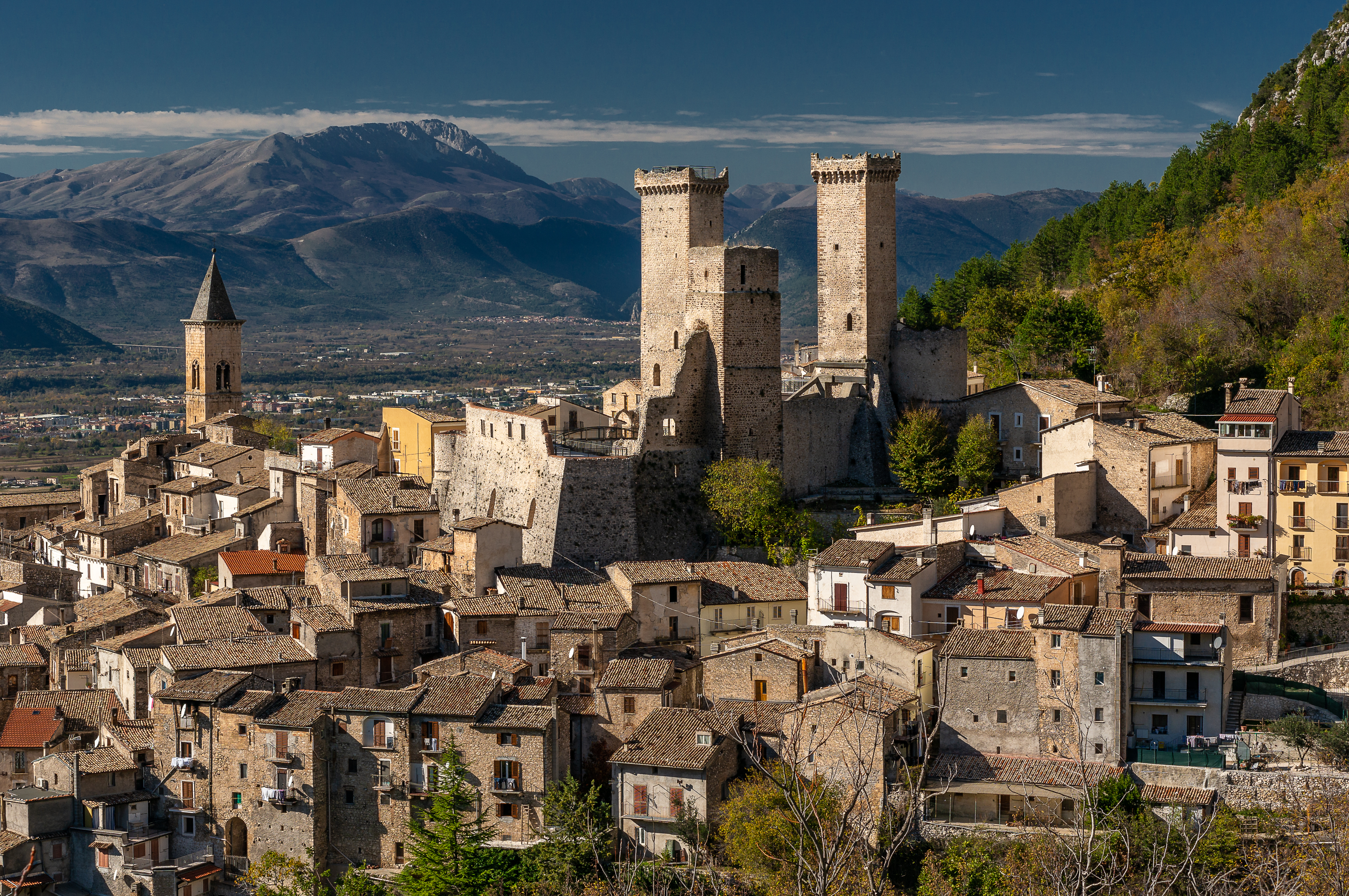
Pacentro, a village member of the association "The Most Beautiful Villages in Italy".

- Abbateggio
- Anversa degli Abruzzi
- Bugnara
- Campli
- Caramanico Terme
- Casoli
- Castel del Monte
- Castelli
- Città Sant'Angelo
- Civitella del Tronto
- Crecchio
- Guardiagrele
- Navelli
- Opi
- Pacentro
- Palena
- Penne
- Pescocostanzo
- Pettorano sul Gizio
- Pietracamela
- Pretoro
- Rocca San Giovanni
- Santo Stefano di Sessanio
- Scanno
- Tagliacozzo
- Villalago

== Transport ==
=== Airports ===
- Abruzzo International Airport is the only international airport in the region. Opened to civilian traffic since 1996, the airport has recorded increasing passenger numbers over the years because of low-cost air carriers' use of the facility. Today, the airport serves over 500,000 passengers annually.
- L'Aquila-Preturo Airport is located near L'Aquila, but remains underused.

=== Ports ===
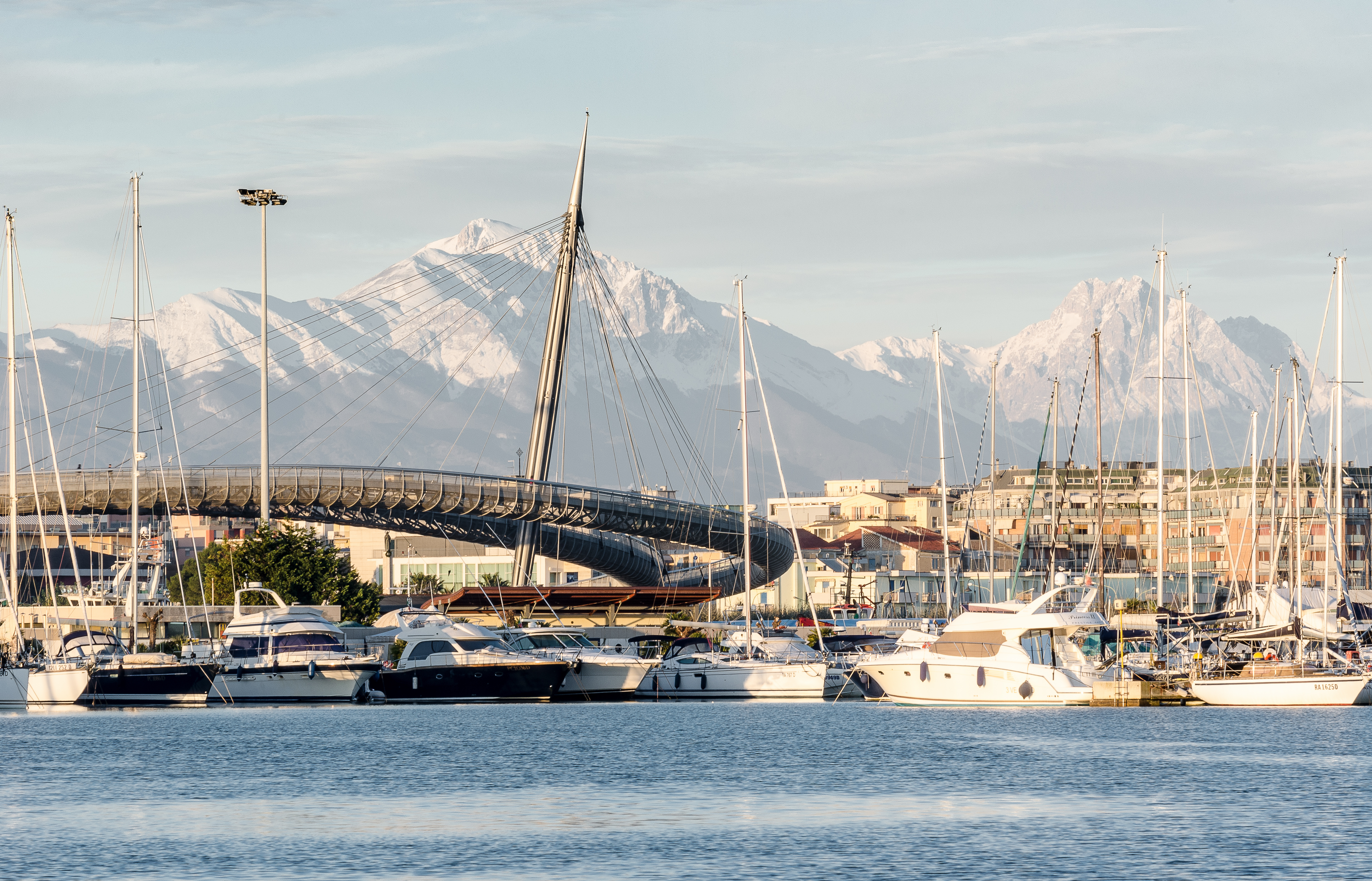
The port of Pescara

There are four main ports in Abruzzo: Pescara, Ortona, Vasto, and Giulianova.

Over the years, the Port of Pescara has become one of the most important tourist ports in Italy and on the Adriatic Sea. Heavily damaged in World War II, it underwent major renovations for roughly sixty years. It now consists of a modern marina with advanced moorings and shipbuilding facilities. It has been awarded the European Union's Blue Flag for its services. The Port of Pescara has lost passenger traffic because of its shallowness and silting. In Abruzzo, marine spatial planning tools such as SeaGIS have been developed to support the management of fisheries and aquaculture, reflecting ongoing planning efforts in the sector.

=== Railways ===
There is a significant disparity between the railways of the Abruzzo coast and the inland areas, which badly need modernization to improve the service, in particular the Rome-Pescara line.

Existing railway lines:

- Adriatic railway runs through the whole of Italy from north to south, along the Adriatic Sea.
- Rome – Sulmona – Pescara
- Sulmona – Carpinone
- Sulmona–Terni railway
- Avezzano railroad – Roccasecca
- Giulianova – Teramo
- Sangritana (Lanciano – Castel di Sangro)

=== Highways ===
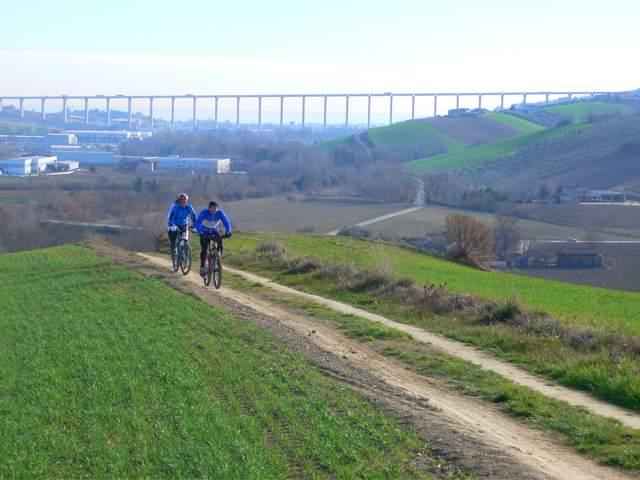
Salinello Bridge on the A14

There are three highways that serve the region:

- A24 (Rome – L'Aquila – Teramo) was built in the 1970s and connects Rome with the Adriatic coast in less than two hours. The Gran Sasso tunnel, the longest road tunnel entirely on Italian territory, was opened in 1984.
- A25 (Torano – Avezzano – Pescara) connects Rome with Pescara. The road branches off A24 in Torano, spans the Fucino basin, crosses the Apennines, and merges with A14 near Pescara.
- A14 Bologna – Taranto known as the "Adriatica", includes 743 km (461.68 mi) of dual-carriage motorway between Bologna and Taranto.

== Culture ==
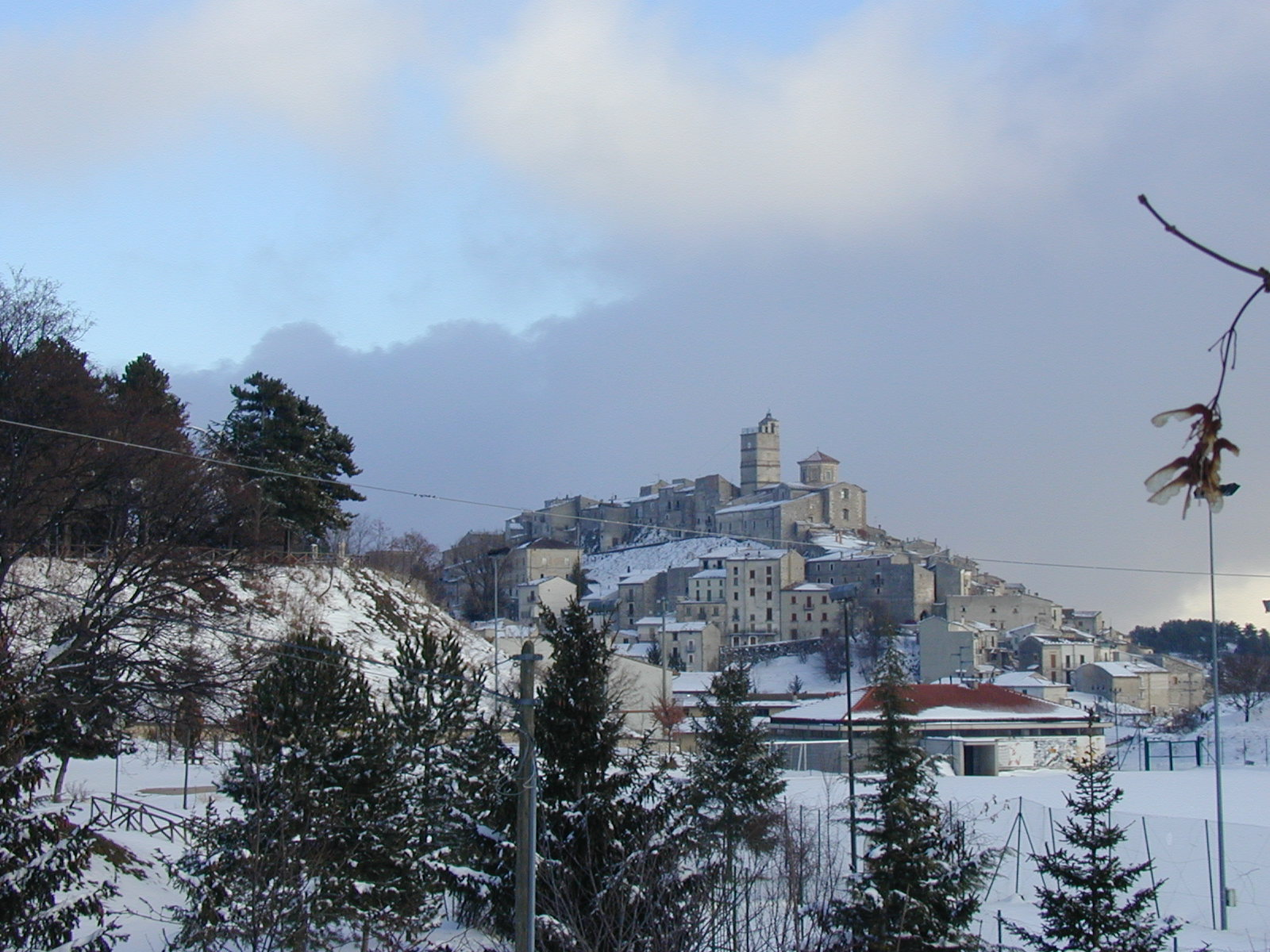
Castel del Monte, one of Abruzzo's little-known hill towns

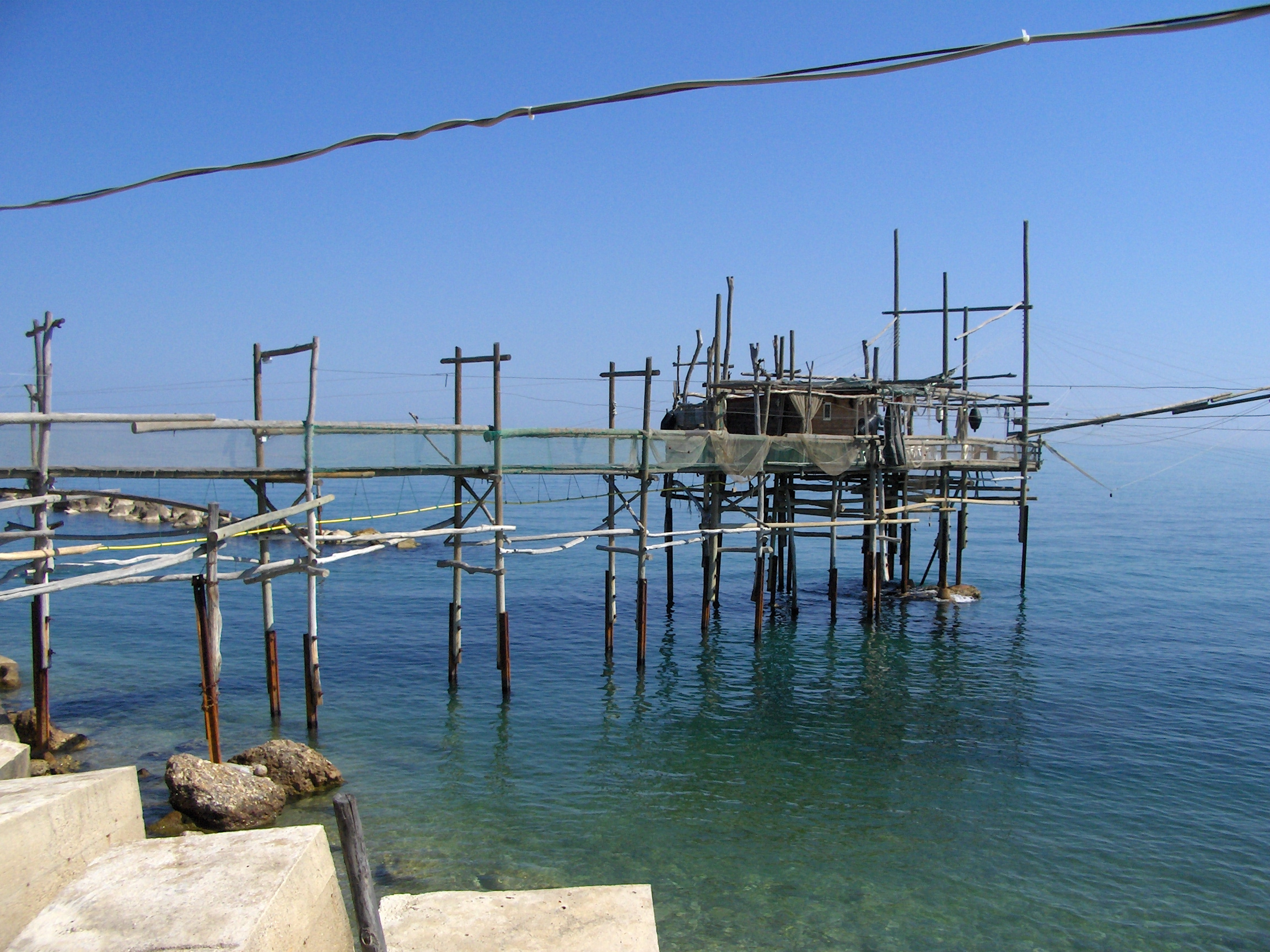
Fishing trabucco of San Vito Chietino

The Museo Archeologico Nazionale d'Abruzzo in Chieti houses the famed Warrior of Capestrano statue, which was found in a necropolis of the 6th century BC. Across the region, among the prominent cultural and historical buildings are: Teramo Cathedral, its archeological museum and the Roman theater, the Castello della Monica, the Collurania-Teramo Observatory, the famous L'Aquila Basilica of Santa Maria di Collemaggio (which holds the remains of Pope Celestine V), the Museo Nazionale d'Abruzzo, Santa Maria del Suffragio, the Forte Spagnolo, the Fountain of 99 Spouts, Gabriele D'Annunzio's house in Pescara, Campli's Scala Sancta and its church, the church of Santissima Annunziata in Sulmona, the cathedrals of Chieti, Lanciano, Guardiagrele, Atri, and Pescara, along with the castles of Ortona, Celano, and Ortucchio.

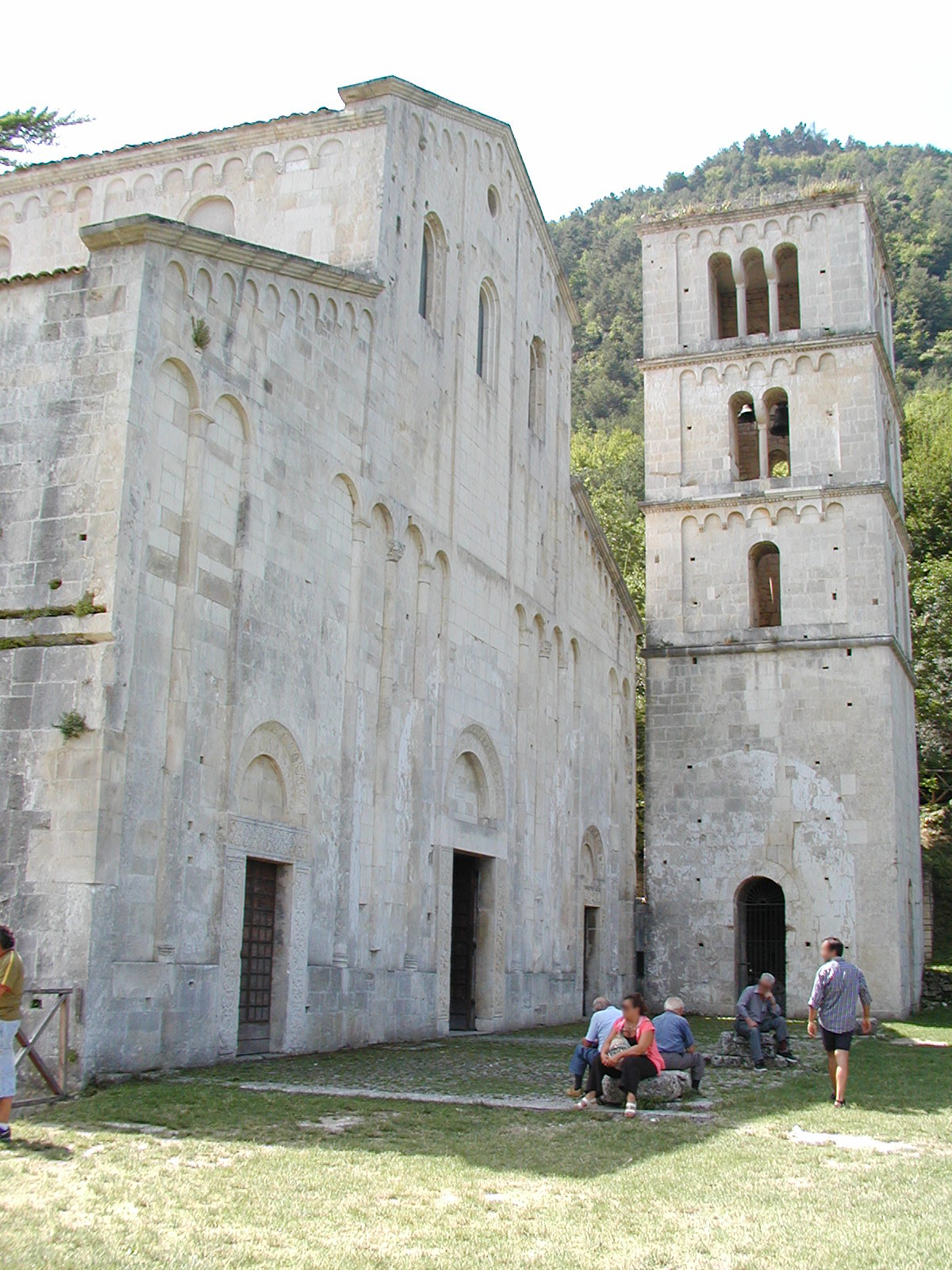
Abbazia di San Liberatore a Majella (Serramonacesca)

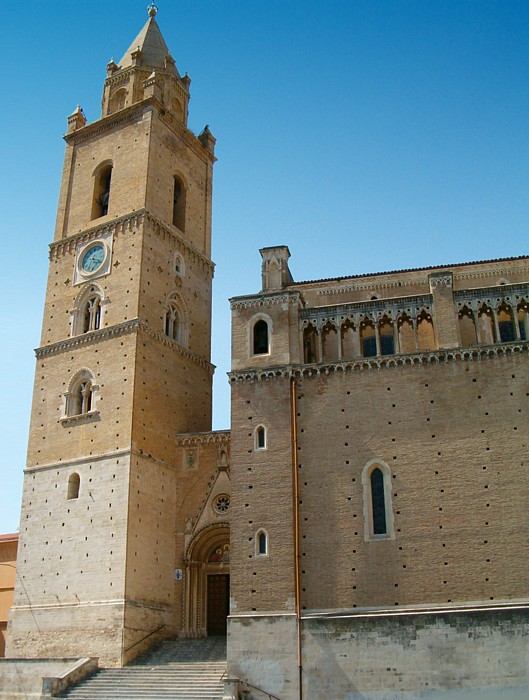
Cathedral of San Giustino (Chieti)

Every year on 28–29 August, L'Aquila's Santa Maria di Collemaggio commemorates the Perdonanza Celestiniana, the indulgence issued by Pope Celestine V to anyone who "truly repentant and confessed" would visit that Church from the Vespers of the vigil to the vespers of 29 August. Sulmona's Holy Week is commemorated with traditional celebrations and rituals, such as "La Madonna che scappa in piazza", when a large statue of Mary, borne by a group of local fraternities, is carried across the square in procession. Cocullo, in the province of L'Aquila, holds the annual "Festa dei serpari" (festival of snake handlers) in which a statue of St. Dominic, covered with live snakes, is carried in a procession through the town; it attracts thousands of Italian and foreign visitors. In many Abruzzo villages, Anthony the Great's feast is celebrated in January with massive, scenic bonfires.

In the past, the region of Abruzzo was well known for the transumanza, the seasonal movement of sheep flocks; these used to travel mostly southbound towards Puglia during the cold winter months. The Feast of St. Biagio, protector of wool dealers, is celebrated across the region. On 3 February in Taranta Peligna, every year since the sixteenth century, an evocative ritual is held: panicelle, or small loaves made of flour and water, in the shape of a blessing hand, are distributed among the faithful.

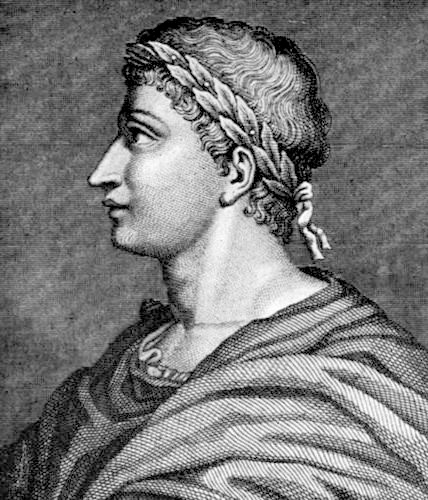
Ovid, from Sulmona

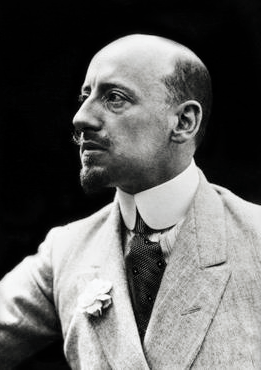
Gabriele d'Annunzio, from Pescara

Historical figures from the region include: the Roman orator Asinius Pollio; Latin poets Sallust and Ovid, who were born in L'Aquila and Sulmona respectively; Gaius Cassius Longinus, Roman senator and leading instigator of the plot to kill Julius Caesar. Pontius Pilate is said to have been native to the region. Abruzzo's religious personalities include Saint Berardo; John of Capistrano; Thomas of Celano, author of three hagiographies of Saint Francis of Assisi; and Alessandro Valignano, who introduced Catholicism to the Far East and Japan. The Polish Pope John Paul II loved the mountains of Abruzzo, where he would retire often and pray in the church of San Pietro della Ienca. Local personalities in the humanities include: writer Ignazio Silone, screenwriter Ennio Flaiano who co-wrote La dolce vita, philosopher Benedetto Croce, poet Gabriele D'Annunzio, composer Paolo Tosti, sculptor Venanzo Crocetti, and artist LorenzoArs.

American artists and celebrities such as Dean Martin, Perry Como, Henry Mancini, Nancy Pelosi, Rocky Marciano, Rocky Mattioli, Bruno Sammartino, Mario Batali, John and Dan Fante, Tommy Lasorda, Dan Marino, Mario Lanza, Garry Marshall, Penny Marshall, Ariana Grande, and Al Martino trace part of their family roots to Abruzzo.

Some international movies shot in Abruzzo include The American, Jean-Jacques Annaud's The Name of the Rose, Fellini's La Strada and I Vitelloni, Schwarzenegger's Red Sonja, Ladyhawke, King David, Francesco, Keoma, The Barbarians, The Fox and the Child, and Krull.

=== Medieval and Renaissance hill towns ===
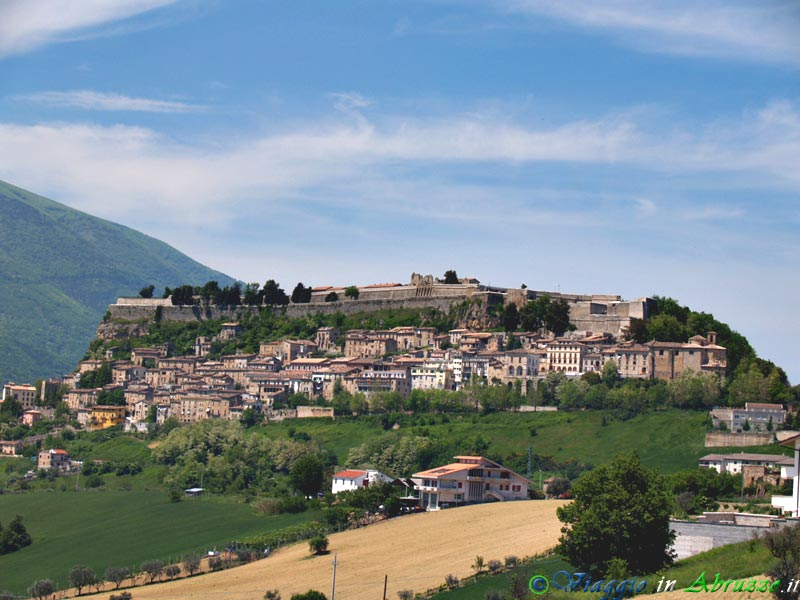
The fortress of Civitella is the most visited monument in Abruzzo.

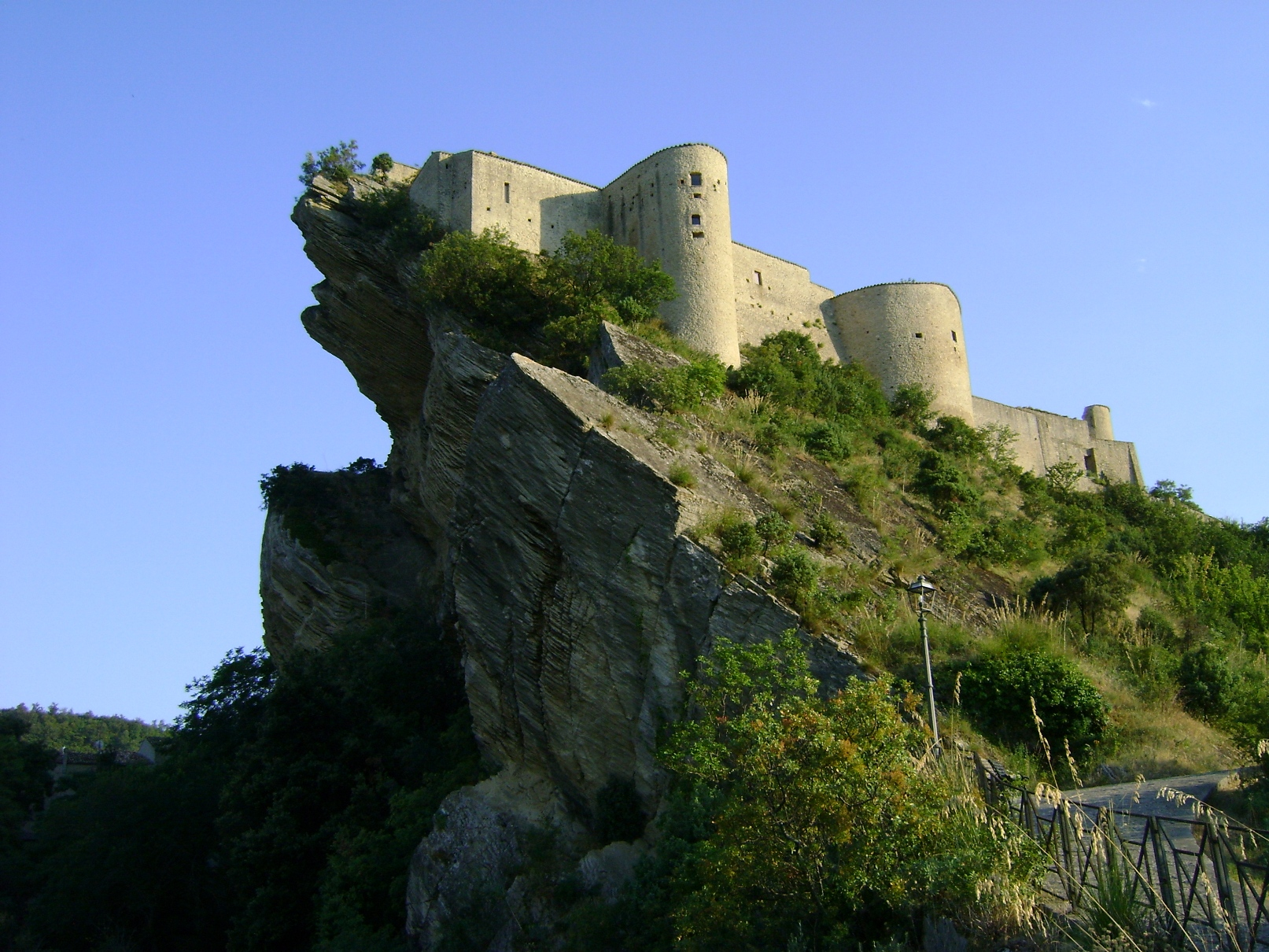
Roccascalegna fortress

Before the 2009 earthquake, Abruzzo was the region with the highest number of castles and hill towns in Italy. It still holds many of Italy's best-preserved medieval and Renaissance hill towns, twenty-three of which are among I Borghi più belli d'Italia. This listing recognises their scenic beauty, arts and culture, their historical importance, and quality of life.

The abrupt decline of Abruzzo's agricultural economy in the early to mid-20th century spared some of the region's historic hill towns from modern development. Many lie entirely within regional and national parks. Among the most best preserved are Castel del Monte and Santo Stefano di Sessanio, within the Gran Sasso National Park on the edge of the high plain of Campo Imperatore and nestled beneath the Apennines' highest peaks. Both hill towns, which were ruled by the Medicis for over a century and a half, see relatively little tourism. Between the two towns sits Rocca Calascio, the ruin of an ancient fortress popular with filmmakers. Monteferrante and Roccascalegna are two of the most representative Abruzzo villages in the province of Chieti. Within the Gran Sasso National Park also lies Castelli, an ancient pottery center whose artisans produced ceramics for most of the royal houses of Europe.

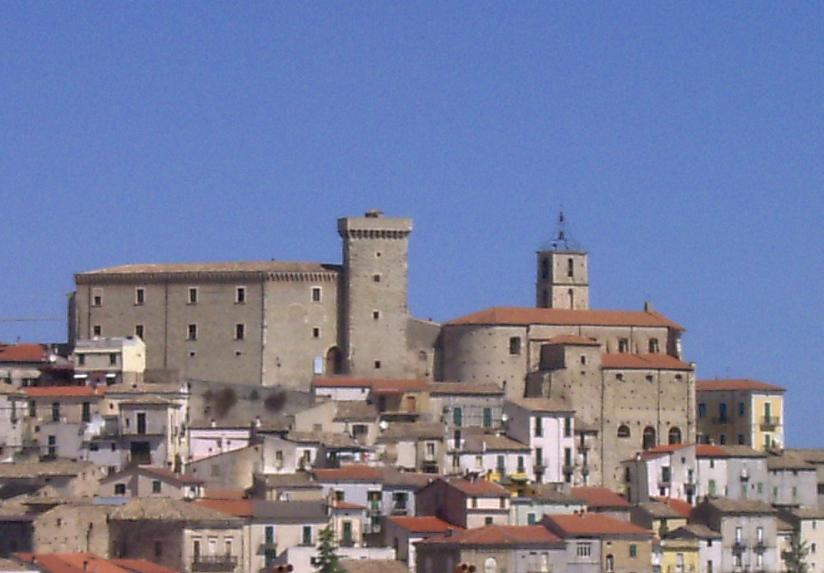
View of Casoli

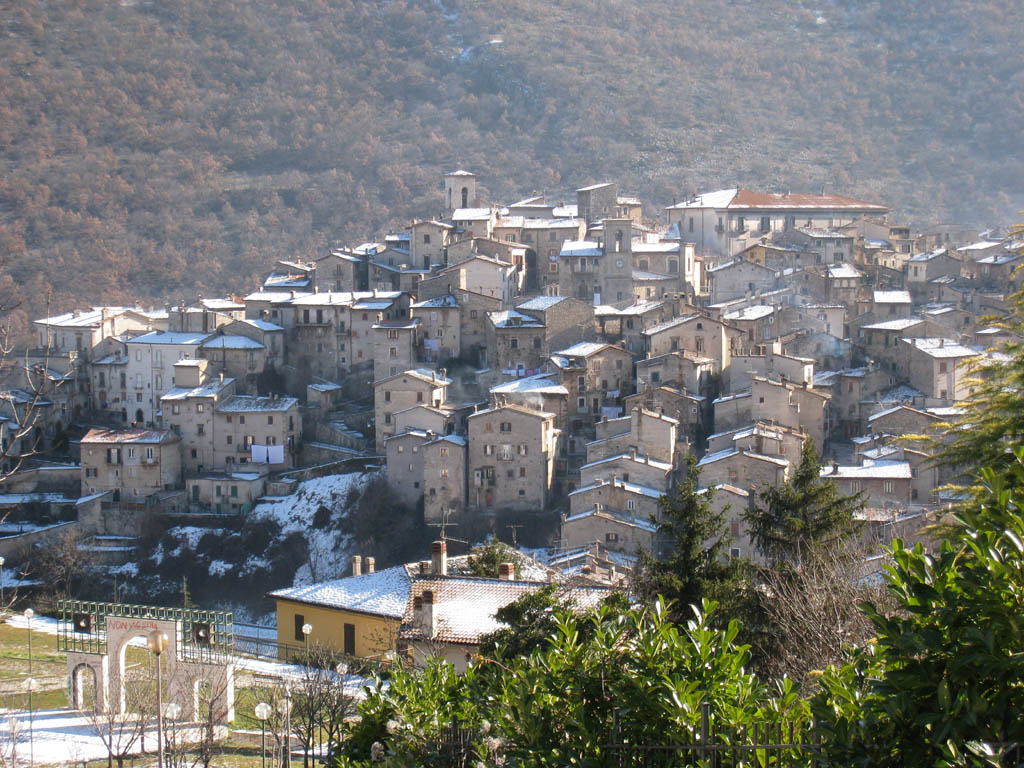
Medieval village of Scanno

Civitella del Tronto played a crucial role in the history of the unification of Italy. The fortress of Civitella is the most visited monument in the Abruzzo region today. Other medieval hill towns located within Abruzzo's park system are Pacentro in the Maiella National Park and Pescasseroli in the Abruzzo National Park. Pacentro, which features a 14th-century castle with two intact towers, has been little touched by modernisation. The Shrine of Gabriel of Our Lady of Sorrows, in the province of Teramo, which attracts some two million visitors per year, is one of the 15 most-visited sanctuaries in the world. Capestrano, a small town in the province of L'Aquila, is the hometown of Saint John of Capistrano, Franciscan friar and Catholic priest, as well as the namesake of the Franciscan mission San Juan Capistrano in Southern California, Mission San Juan Capistrano in Texas, and the city of San Juan Capistrano in Orange County, California. Giulianova is a notable example of a Renaissance "ideal city".

The proximity to Rome, the protected areas, and scenic landscapes make the region one of the greenest in Europe. The presence of quaint villages and its rich and varied culinary traditions are important tourist attractions. In 2010, visitors included 6,381,067 Italians and 925,884 foreign tourists.

In 2015, the American organization Live and Invest Overseas included Abruzzo on its list of World's Top 21 Overseas Retirement Havens. The study was based on such factors as climate, infrastructure, health care, safety, taxes, and cost of living. In 2017, the Chamber of Commerce of Pescara presented Abruzzo region to the annual conference of Live and Invest Overseas in the U.S. city of Orlando, Florida. One year later, in October 2018, Live and Invest Overseas held its first conference in Abruzzo.

=== Universities ===
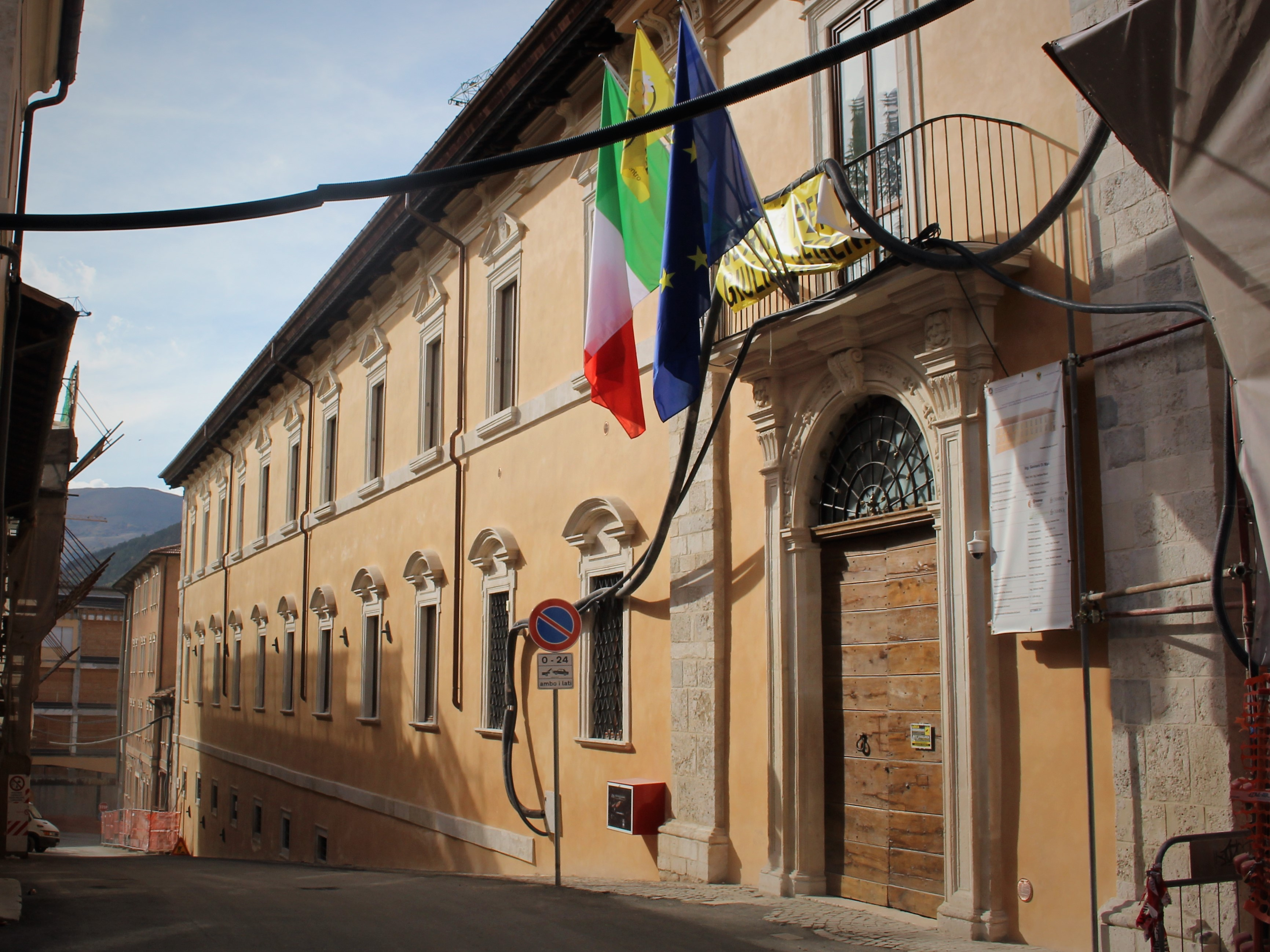
University of L'Aquila

There are three universities in the Abruzzo region:

- University of L'Aquila
- D'Annunzio University of Chieti–Pescara
- University of Teramo

Harvard University bases an intensive summer Italian language and culture program in Vasto, a resort town on Abruzzo's southern coast.

=== Science ===
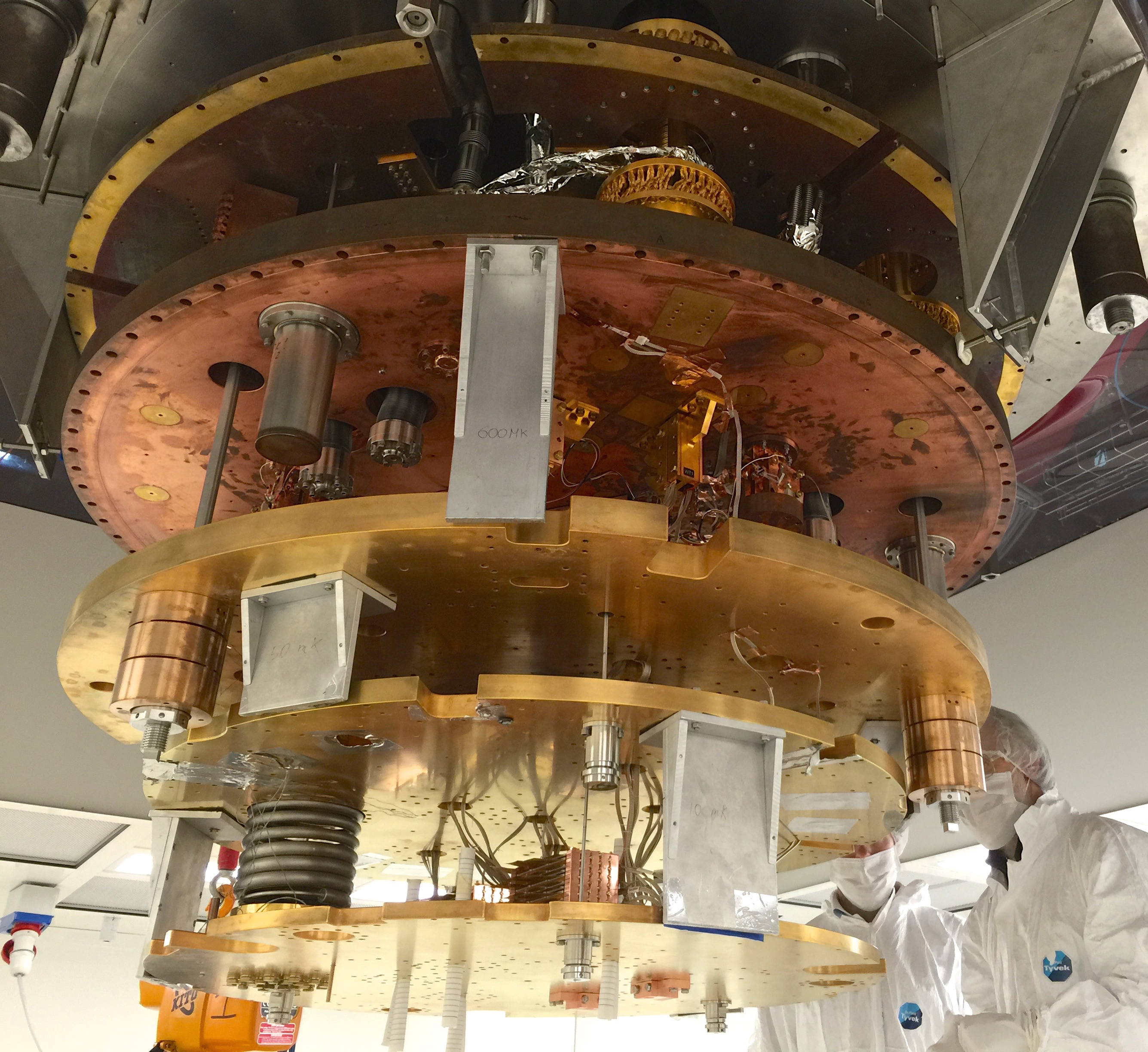
Laboratori Nazionali del Gran Sasso

Between the province of Teramo and L'Aquila, under the Gran Sasso Tunnel, is the Laboratori Nazionali del Gran Sasso (LNGS) of the INFN, one of the three underground astroparticle laboratories in Europe.

The Istituto Zooprofilattico Sperimentale dell'Abruzzo e del Molise "Giuseppe Caporale", which conducts research in veterinary and environmental public health, is located in Teramo.

The Gran Sasso Science Institute, located in L'Aquila, is an advanced research institute which offers doctorates in astroparticle physics, computer science, and mathematics, as well as urban studies and regional science, and which also conducts scientific research.

=== Sports ===
Interamnia World Cup, the largest international youth handball competition worldwide, takes place yearly in Teramo.

There are several football clubs in Abruzzo. Delfino Pescara 1936 is a Serie B club; based in Pescara, its home stadium is Stadio Adriatico – Giovanni Cornacchia.

=== Dialects ===
Dialect map of Abruzzo

The regional dialects of Abruzzo include Teramano, Abruzzese Orientale Adriatico, and Abruzzese Occidentale. The first two forms are dialects of the Southern Italian language also known as Neapolitan, since the region has been part of the Kingdom of Naples and the Kingdom of the Two Sicilies, while Aquilano is related to the Central Italian dialects including Romanesco. The dialects spoken in the Abruzzo region can be divided into three main groups:

1. Sabine dialect, in the province of L'Aquila, a central Italian dialect
2. Abruzzo Adriatic dialect, in the province of Teramo, Pescara and Chieti, that is virtually abandoned in the province of Ascoli Piceno, a southern Italian dialect
3. Abruzzo western dialect, in the province of L'Aquila, a southern Italian dialect

== Cuisine ==
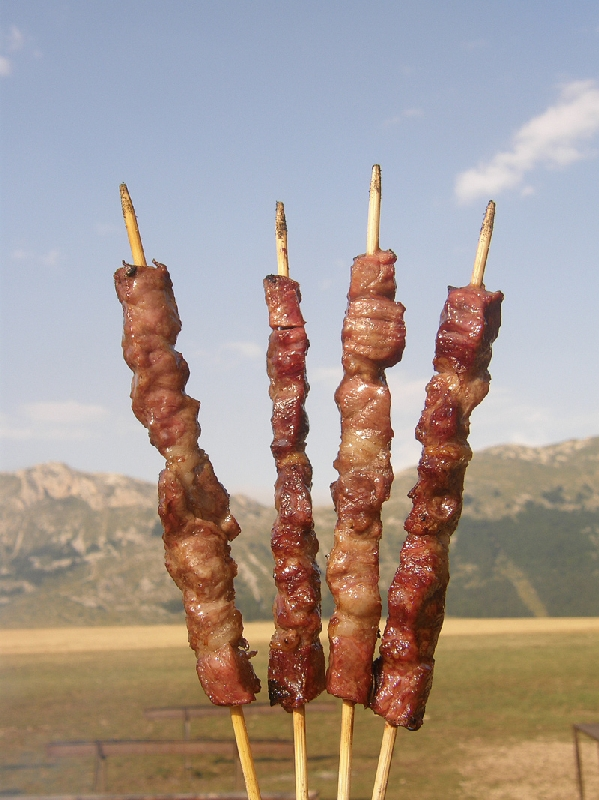
Arrosticini of Pescara valley

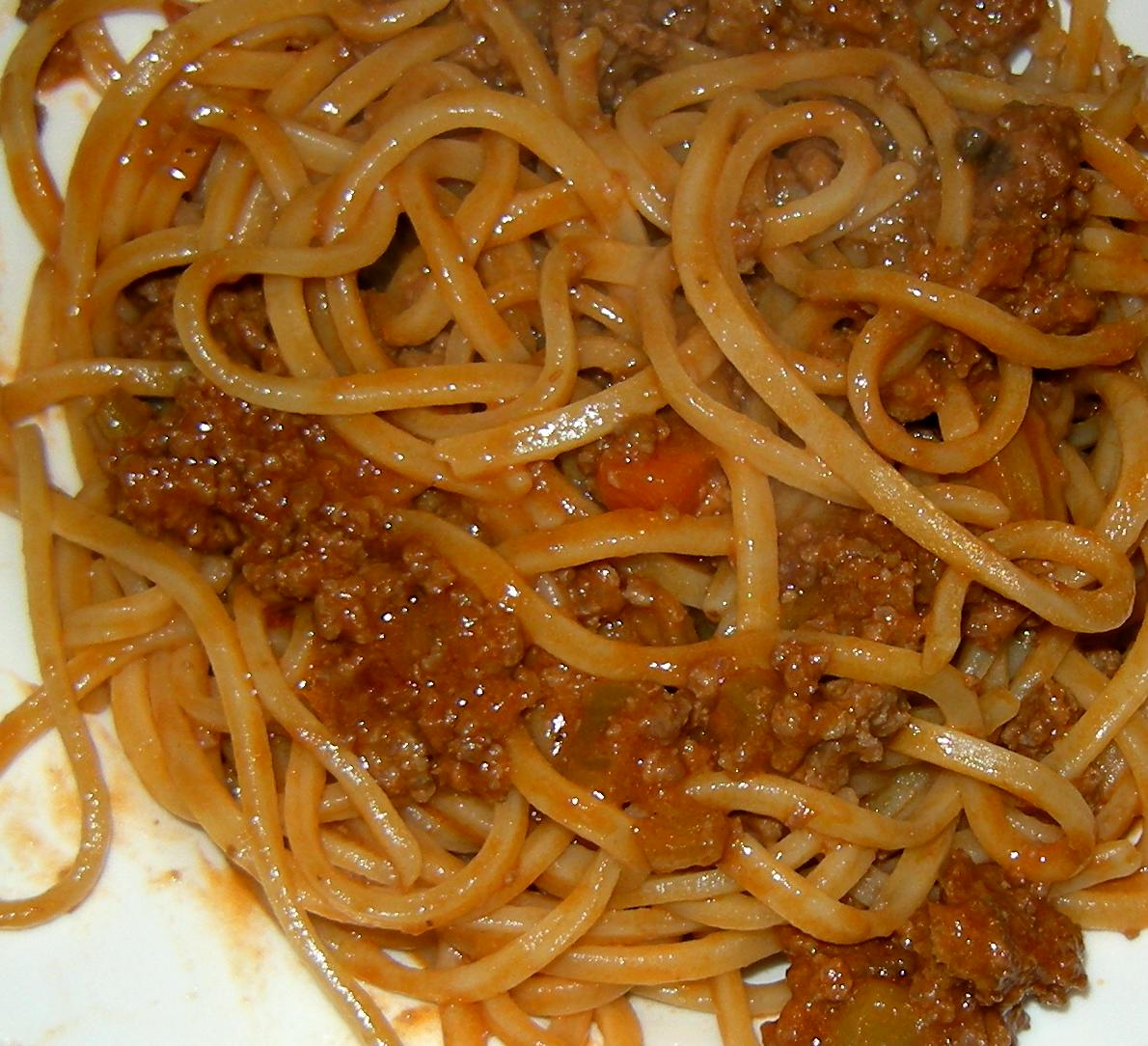
Spaghetti alla chitarra of Teramo

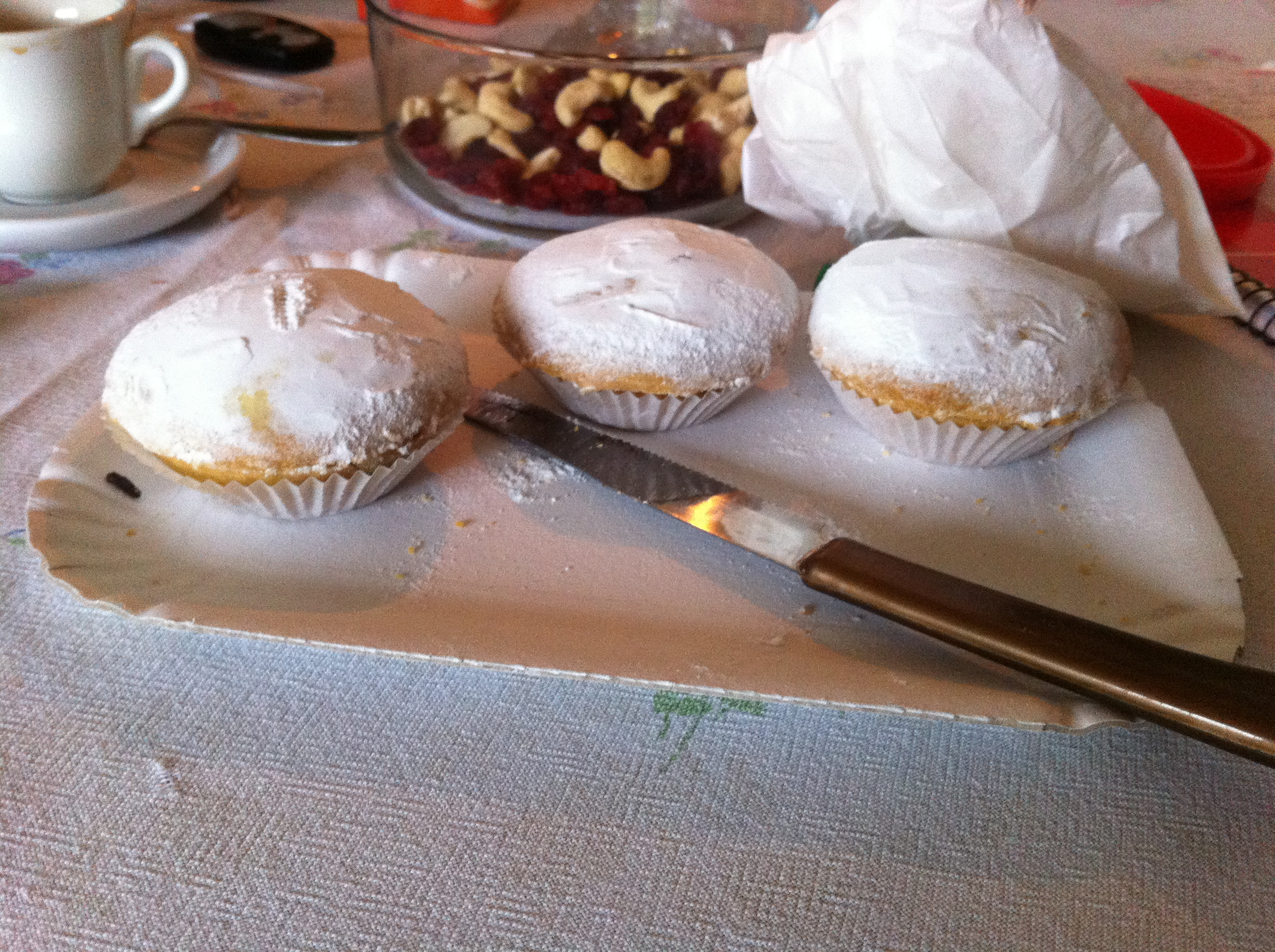
Typical bocconotto of Castel Frentano

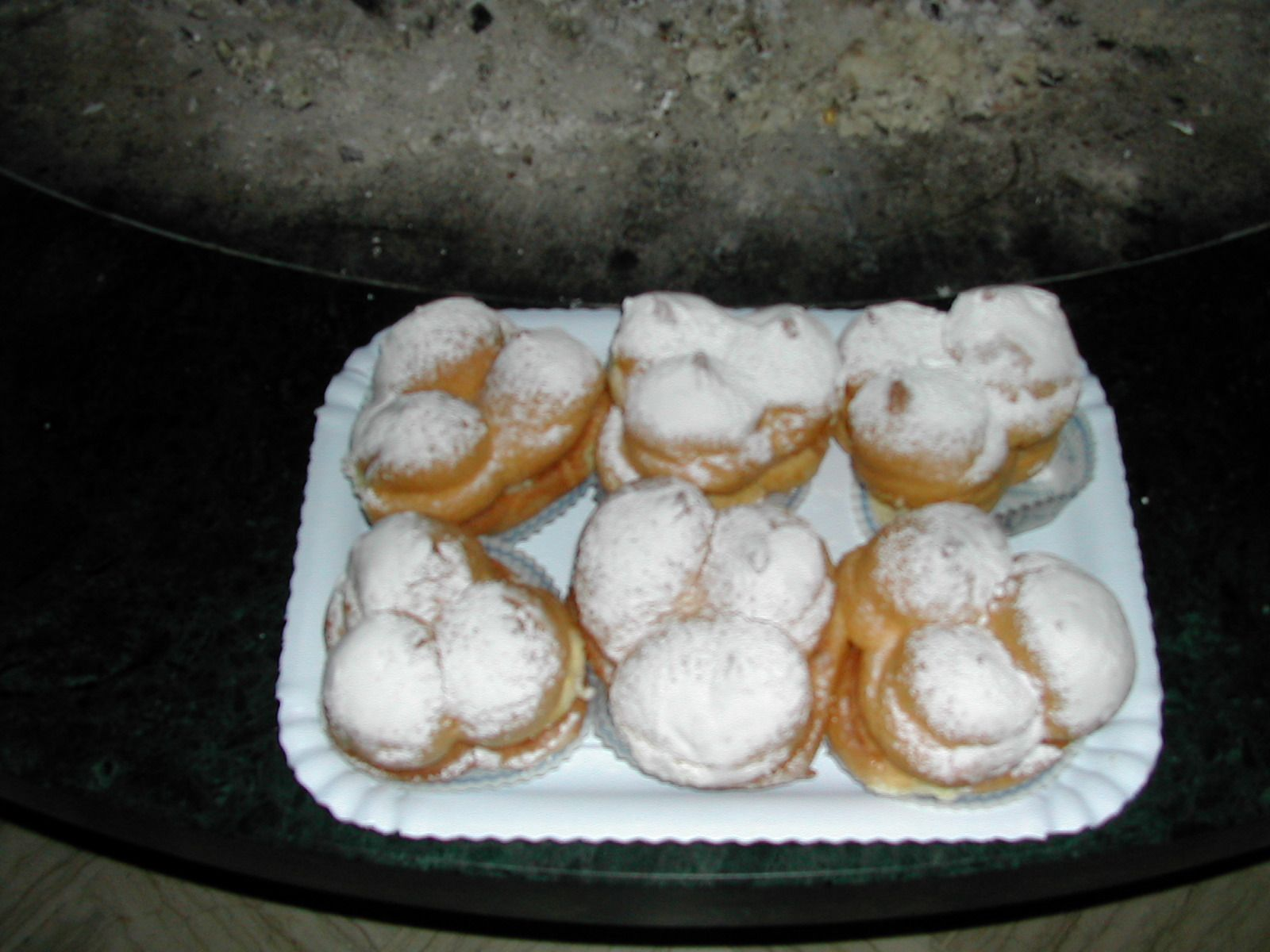
Sise delle Monache from Guardiagrele

Abruzzo's cuisine is renowned for its variety and richness. Both the agricultural and coastal areas of Abruzzo have contributed to its cuisine. Due to the mountains, much of Abruzzo was relatively isolated until the 20th century. This has contributed to preserving local culinary traditions.

=== Ingredients ===
In terms of common ingredients, cuisine in Abruzzo often includes:

- Lamb and mutton, primarily in the mountains. Sheep's milk (or ricotta) is an important source of Abruzzese cheese, and lamb intestines are used as sausage casing or for stuffed meat rolls. Mountain goat meat is also common in Abruzzo.
- Truffles and mushrooms, particularly wild mushrooms from the forests and hills
- Garlic, especially red garlic
- Rosemary
- Hot chili pepper or peperoncini, regionally known as diavolilli or diavoletti, is common in Abruzzese cuisine and often used to add spice to dishes. Abruzzo residents are well known for frequently adding peperoncini, or hot peppers, to their meals.
- Vegetables such as lentils, grasspeas and other legumes, artichoke, eggplant, and cauliflower

=== Starter and main dishes ===
- Spaghetti alla chitarra is made by pressing or cutting pasta through a chitarra, an implement that forms long thin noodles similar to spaghetti. The pasta is served with a tomato-based sauce, often flavored with peppers, pork, goose, or lamb. This dish is complemented by regional side dishes, such as the bean and noodle soup sagne e fagioli. This soup is traditionally flavored with tomatoes, garlic, oil, and peperoncini.
- Gnocchi carrati, flavored with bacon, eggs, and pecorino cheese
- Scrippelle, a rustic French-style crêpe served either mbusse (a type of soup) or used to form a sort of soufflé with ragù and stuffed with chicken liver, meatballs, hard-boiled eggs, and cheese
- Pastuccia, a polenta stew with sausage, eggs, and cheese
- Pasta allo sparone, a pasta roll filled with ricotta cheese and spinach. The pasta roll is boiled in hot water and served with tomato sauce and Parmesan cheese.
- Pasta alla mugnaia, a long, uneven and thick type of pasta that is hand-pulled to a diameter of up to 6mm and is traditionally served with tomato sauce. Pasta alla mugnaia, also simply known as mugnaia, is the flagship dish of the town of Elice.
- Pallotte cacio e ovo, balls of caciocavallo cheese and eggs, usually served as a starter in a rich tomato sauce.

=== Meat ===
Across the region, roast lamb is enjoyed in several variations. Some of these variations include:

- Arrosticini, a skewered lamb dish
- Pecora al cotturo, lamb stuffed with a variety of mountain herbs and cooked in a copper pot
- Lamb cooked whole in a bread oven
- Agnello cacio e ovo, a lamb-based fricassee
- Mazzarella: lamb intestines stuffed with lamb, garlic, marjoram, lettuce, and spices
- Le virtù: a soup from Teramo filled with legumes, vegetables and pork, made only on 1 May.
- Timballo abruzzese: lasagna-like dish with pasta sheets (scrippelle) layered with meat, vegetables and rice; often served for Christmas and Easter
- Porchetta abruzzese: moist boneless-pork roast, slow-roasted with rosemary, garlic, and pepper

=== Seafood ===
Seafood is also popular, especially in coastal areas. The variety of fish available locally resulted in several fish-based brodetti ("broths"), coming from such places as Vasto, Giulianova, and Pescara. These broths are often made by cooking fish, flavored with tomatoes, herbs, and peperoncino, in an earthenware pot. Other fish products are scapece alla vastese, baccalà all'abruzzese, and coregone di Campotosto, typical lake fish.

=== Pizzas ===
Rustic pizzas are also very common. Some of these are:

- Easter pizza, a rustic cake with cheese and pepper from the Teramo area
- Fiadoni from Chieti, a dough of eggs and cheese well risen, cooked in the oven in a thin casing of pastry
- A rustic tart pastry filled with everything imaginable: eggs, fresh cheeses, ricotta, vegetables, and all sorts of flavorings and spices.

Also from Teramo are the spreadable sausages flavored with nutmeg, and liver sausages tasting of garlic and spices. Atri and Rivisondoli are famous for cheeses. Mozzarella, either fresh or seasoned, is made from ewe's milk, although a great number of lesser known varieties of these cheeses can be found all over Abruzzo and Molise.

=== Salumi ===
Salumi (singular: salume) is an Italian term describing the preparation of cured meat products made predominantly from pork.

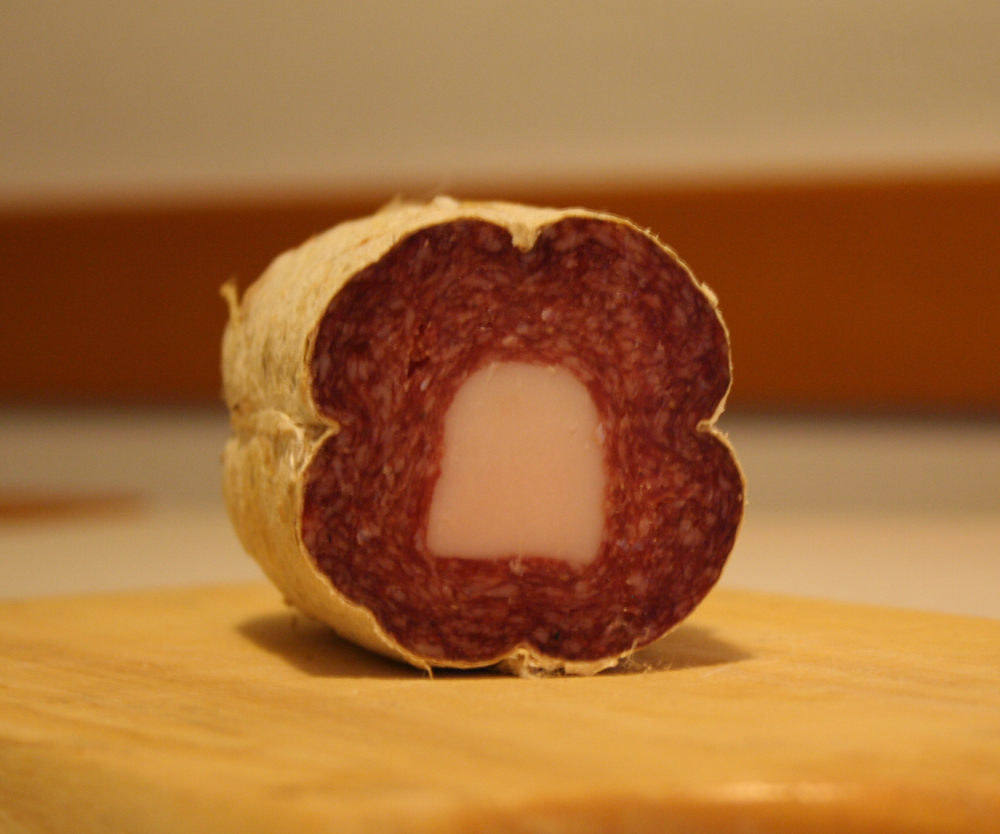
Mortadella di Campotosto

Spreadable sausage flavored with nutmeg and liver sausage with garlic and spices are hallmarks of Teramo cuisine. Ventricina from the Vasto area is made with large pieces of fat and lean pork, pressed and seasoned with powdered sweet peppers and fennel, and encased in dried pig stomach. Mortadella di Campotosto (well known in Abruzzo) is an oval, dark-red mortadella with a white column of fat. They are generally sold in pairs, tied together. Another name for the mortadella is coglioni di mulo (donkey's balls). It is made from shoulder and loin meat, prosciutto trimmings, and fat. It is 80 percent lean meat; 25 percent is prosciutto (ham), and 20 percent is pancetta. The meat is minced and mixed with salt, pepper and white wine.

=== Cheeses ===
The region's principal cheeses are:

- White cow cheese, a soft cheese made from cow's milk
- Caciocavallo abruzzese, a soft, slightly elastic dairy product made from raw, whole cow's milk with rennet and salt
- Caciofiore Aquilano, made from raw whole sheep's milk, rennet, artichokes, and saffron (which gives it its characteristic yellow color)
- Caciotta vaccina frentana, a half-cooked, semi-hard cheese made from raw whole cow's milk, rennet and salt
- Canestrato of Castel del Monte, a hard cheese made from raw whole sheep's milk, with rennet and salt

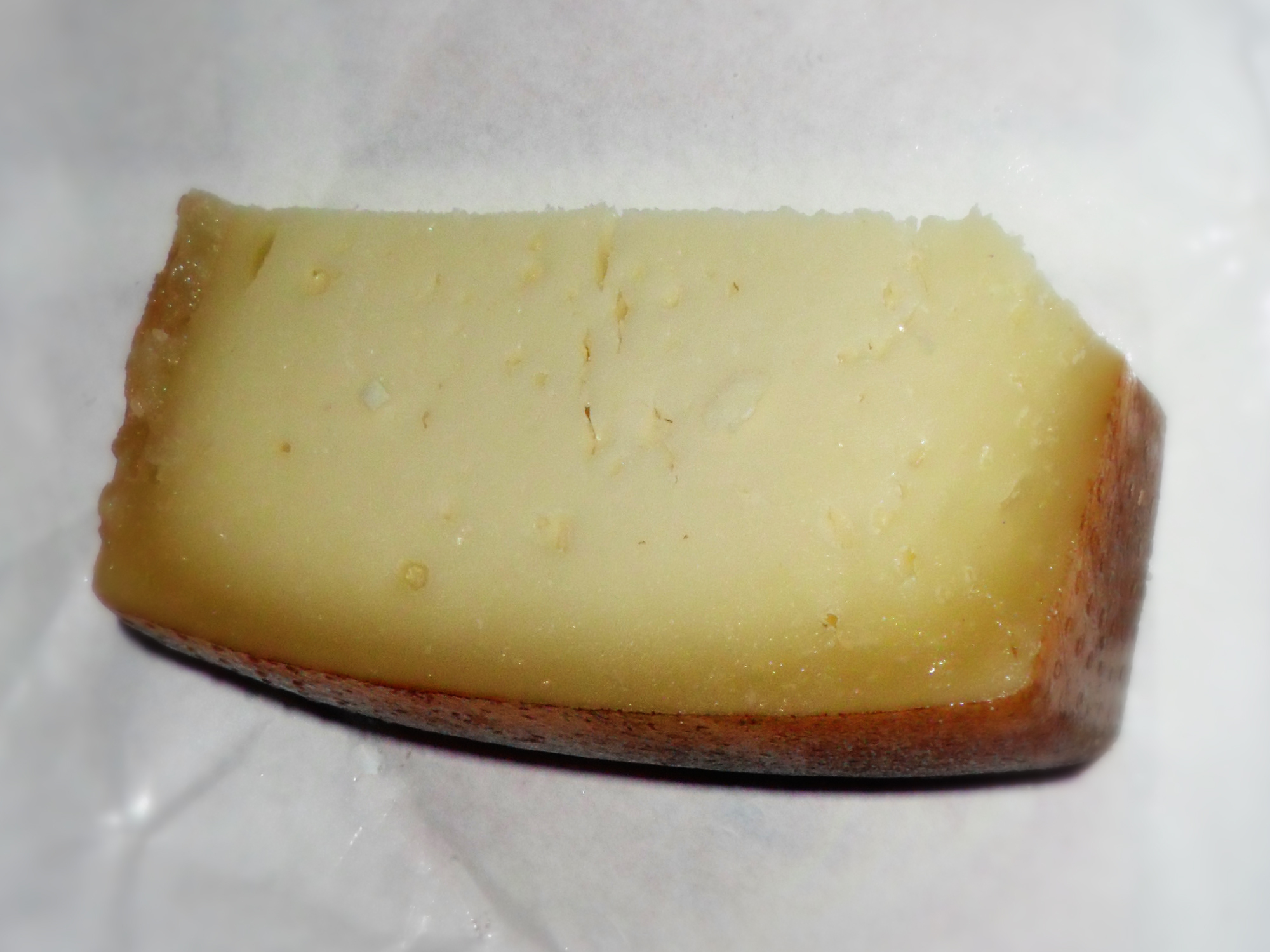
Caprino

- Caprino abruzzese, made from raw whole goat milk (sometimes with sheep's milk), curd, and salt
- Cheese and curd stazzo, cheese and byproducts obtained from the processing of raw milk from sheep, cattle and goats
- Junket vaccina or Abruzzo sprisciocca, a soft fresh cheese made from raw whole cow's milk, rennet, and salt
- Pecorino d'Abruzzo: one of Abruzzo's flagship products—a mild, semi-hard (or hard) cheese with holes, made from raw whole sheep's milk, rennet, and salt
- Pecorino di Atri, a compact, semi-cooked cheese made from sheep's milk, rennet and salt
- Pecorino di Farindola, cheese made from sheep's milk and pork rennet (a special type of rennet, made by filling a dried pork stomach with vinegar and white wine for forty days)
- Ricotta, made from the remnants of the coagulation of raw whole sheep's milk, heated after filtration
- Scamorza d'Abruzzo, a stretched curd cheese made from cow's milk, rennet (liquid or powder) and salt

Atri and Rivisondoli are known for their cheeses. Mozzarella (fresh or seasoned) is typically made from ewe's milk; many lesser-known cheeses are found throughout Abruzzo and Molise.

=== Desserts and sweets ===
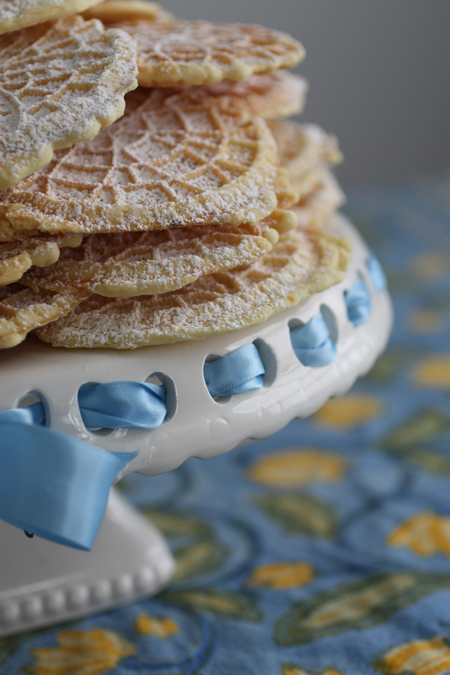
Pizzelle are a typical Abruzzo sweet.

Abruzzo's sweets are well known:

- Dragée (also known as confetti): sugar-coated almonds from Sulmona
- Torrone Nurzia: chocolate nougat from L'Aquila
- Parrozzo: a cake-like treat made from crushed almonds and coated in chocolate
- Pizzelle (also known as ferratelle): a waffle cookie, often flavored with anise
- Croccante, a type of nougat made from almonds and caramelized sugar, often flavored with lemon
- Calgionetti, cagionetti, caggiunitti, caviciunette: Christmas fritters, sometimes filled with chestnuts or chickpeas and flavored with chocolate or cocoa
- Bocconotti: stuffed sweets often served for Christmas
- Zeppole di San Giuseppe: fried or baked pastries made for Saint Joseph's Day
- Sise delle monache, two layers of sponge cake filled with custard, produced in the town of Guardiagrele in the province of Chieti

=== Fruits ===
The region's principal fruits are:

- Agrumi della costa dei trabocchi: coastal citrus (particularly oranges), used for jam and Limoncello
- Castagna roscetta della Valle Roveto and Marrone di Valle Castellana: types of chestnut
- Ciliege di Raiano e di Giuliano Teatino: a local cherry
- Mandorle di Navelli: almonds from the town of Navelli
- Mela della Valle Giovenco: apples from the region
- Uva di Tollo e Ortona: table grapes, also used for jam

=== Olive oil ===
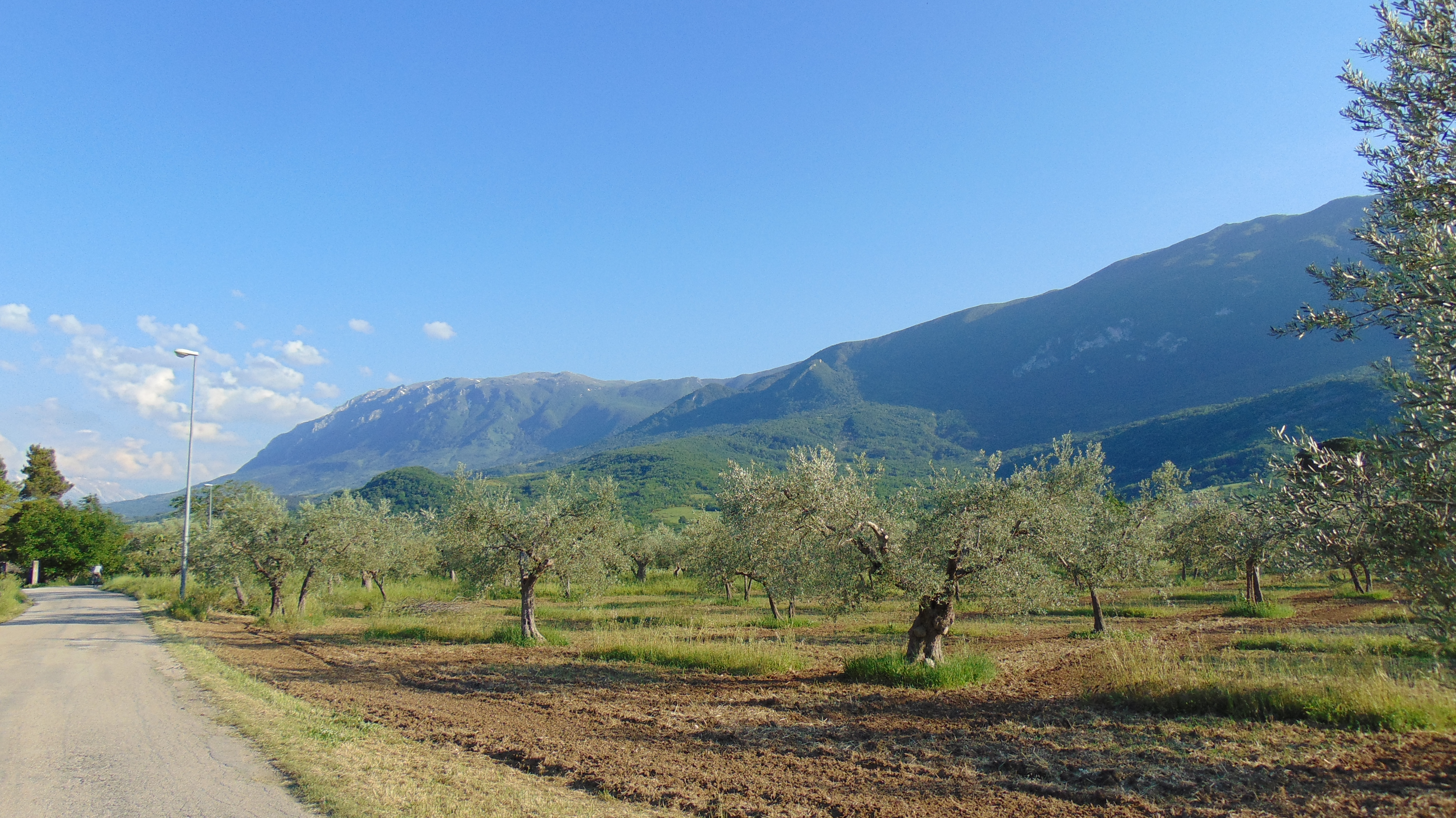
Olive trees in Tocco da Casauria

The use of oil in regional mountain and sea dishes is important; among the most common oil products are the Aprutino Pescarese, the Pretuziano delle Colline Teramane, l'Olio extra vergine di oliva delle Valli Aquilane and Colline Teatine.

The list of Abruzzo olive cultivars:

- Castiglionese
- Dritta
- Gentile di Chieti
- Intosso
- Monicella
- Carpinetana
- Morella
- Nebbio di Chieti
- Raja
- Toccolana
- Tortiglione
- Crognalegna
- Gentile del L'Aquila (Rusticana del L'Aquila)

The extra-virgin olive oil produced in Colline Teramane (Teramo hills) is marked by the DOP.

The region has several cultivars that include Carboncella, Dritta (Dritta Francavillese and Dritta di Moscufo), Gentile del Chieti, Nostrana (Nostrana di Brisighella), and Sargano olive cultivars.

=== Wines and liquors ===
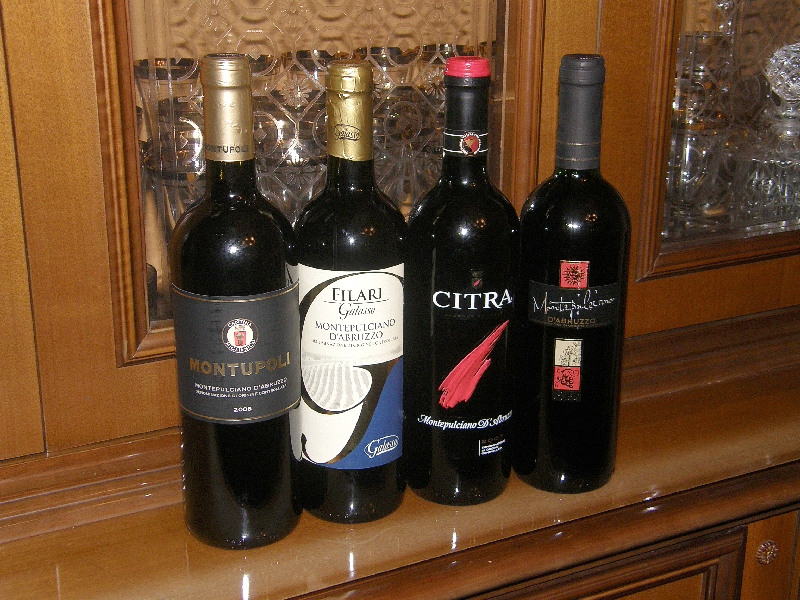
Bottles of Montepulciano d'Abruzzo wine

Renowned wines such as Montepulciano DOCG, Trebbiano d'Abruzzo DOC and Controguerra DOC are judged to be amongst the world's finest. In 2012, a bottle of Trebbiano d'Abruzzo ranked No. 1 in the top 50 Italian wine awards.

In recent decades these wines have been joined, particularly, by wines from lesser known (heritage) white grapes, such as Pecorino, Cococciola, Passerina, Montonico bianco and Fiano.

IGT wines are Alto Tirino, Colli Aprutini, Colli del Sangro, Colline Frentane, Colline Pescaresi, Colline Teatine, Del Vastese (or Histonium), Terre di Chieti, and Valle Peligna. The region is also well known for the production of liqueurs such as Centerbe, Limoncello, Ratafia, and Genziana.

== Gallery ==
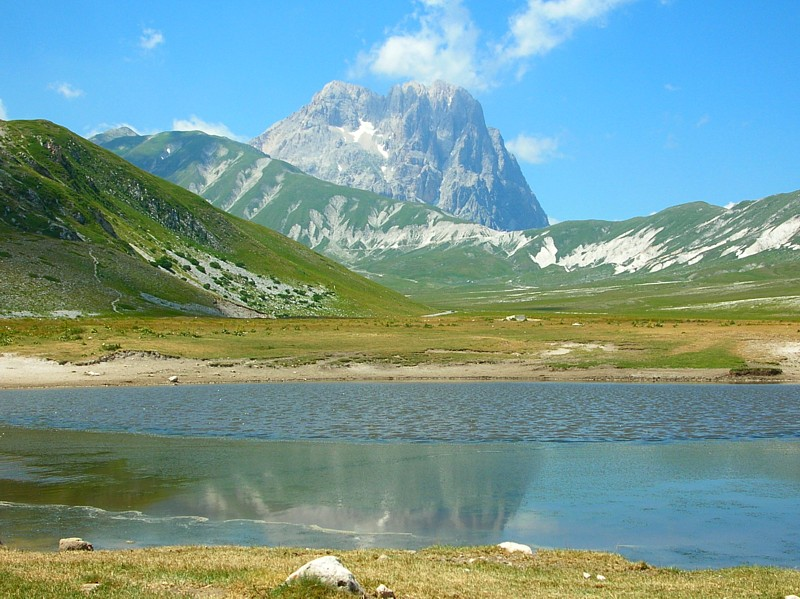
Campo Imperatore

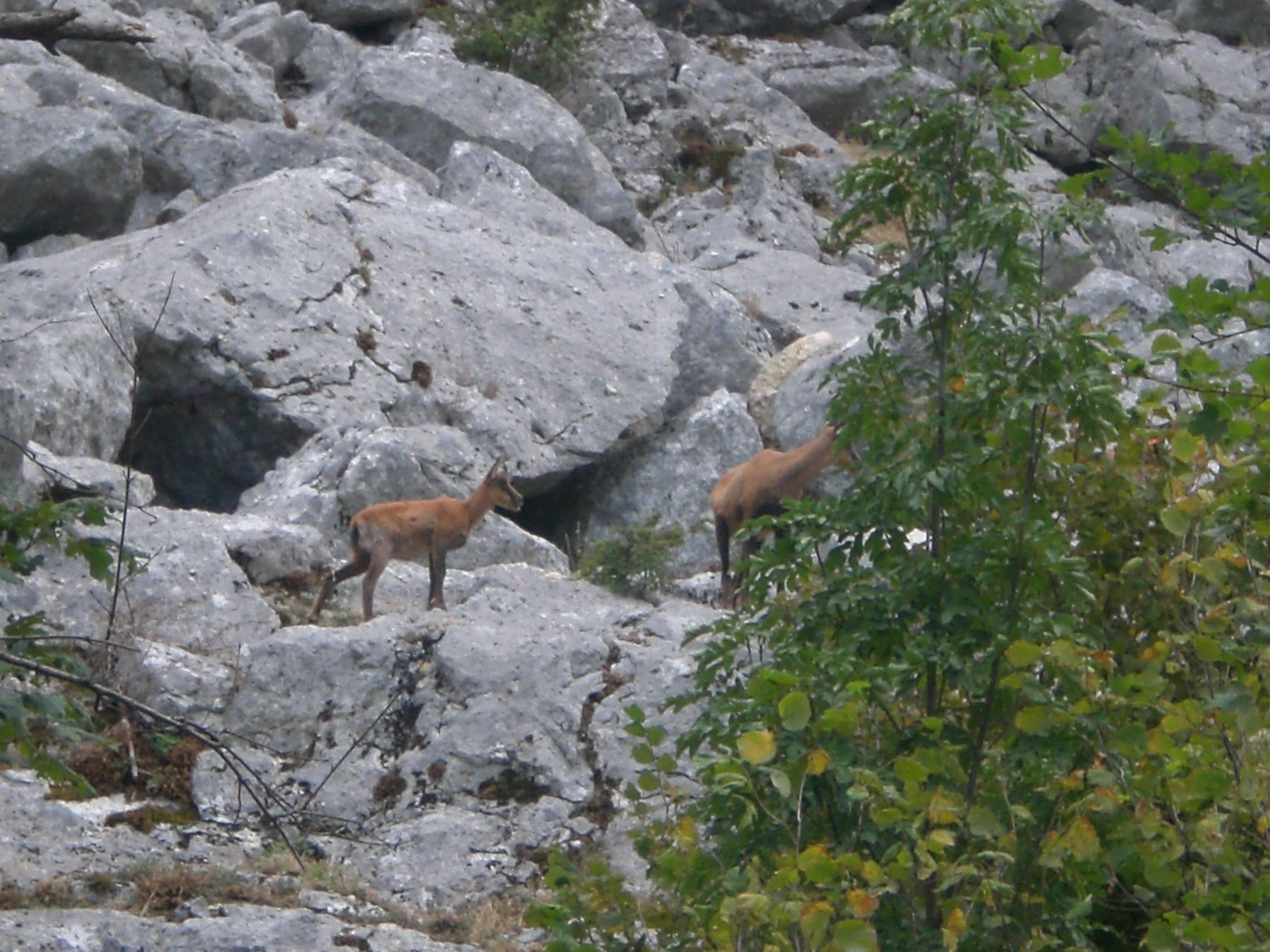
Abruzzo Chamois

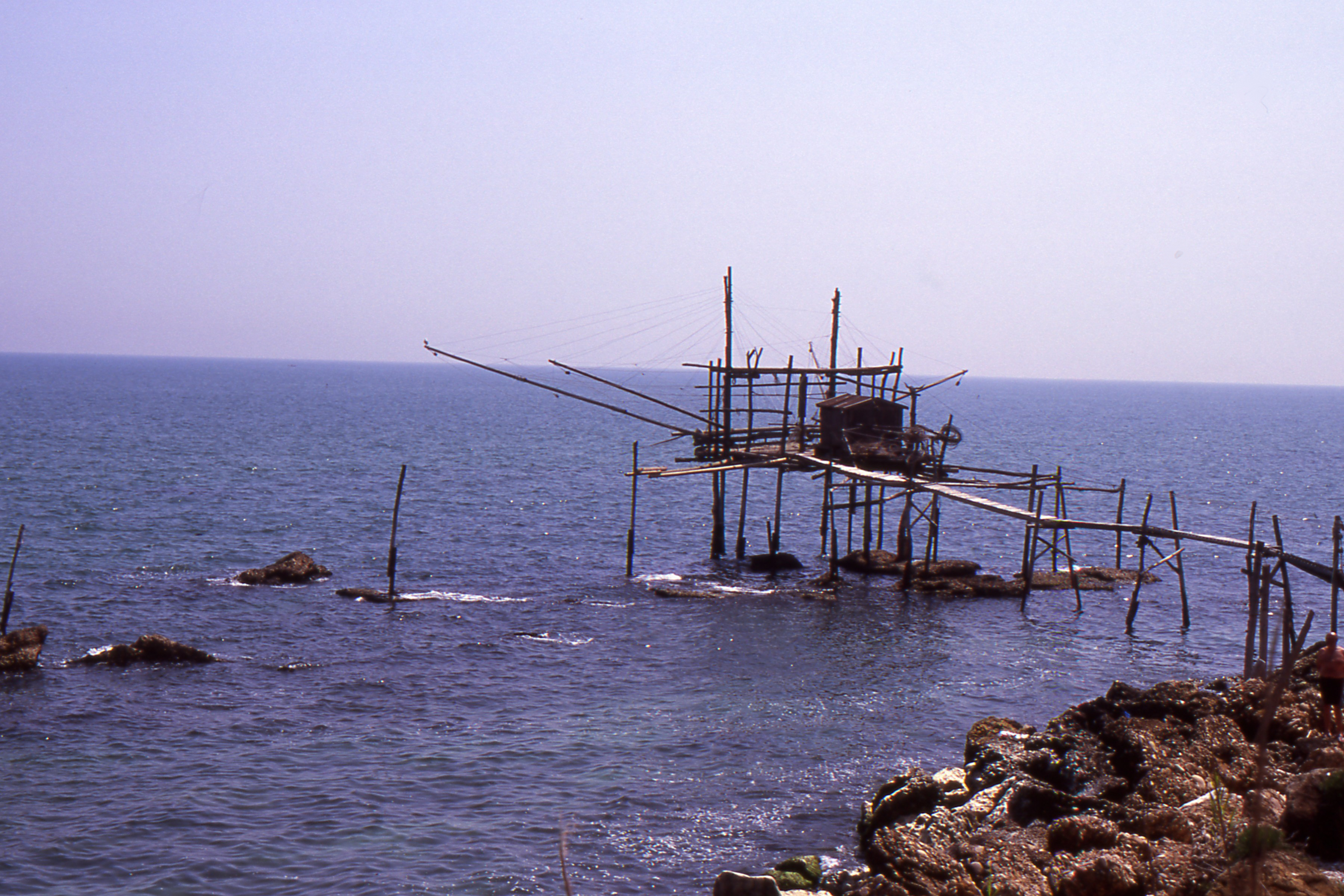
San Vito Chietino

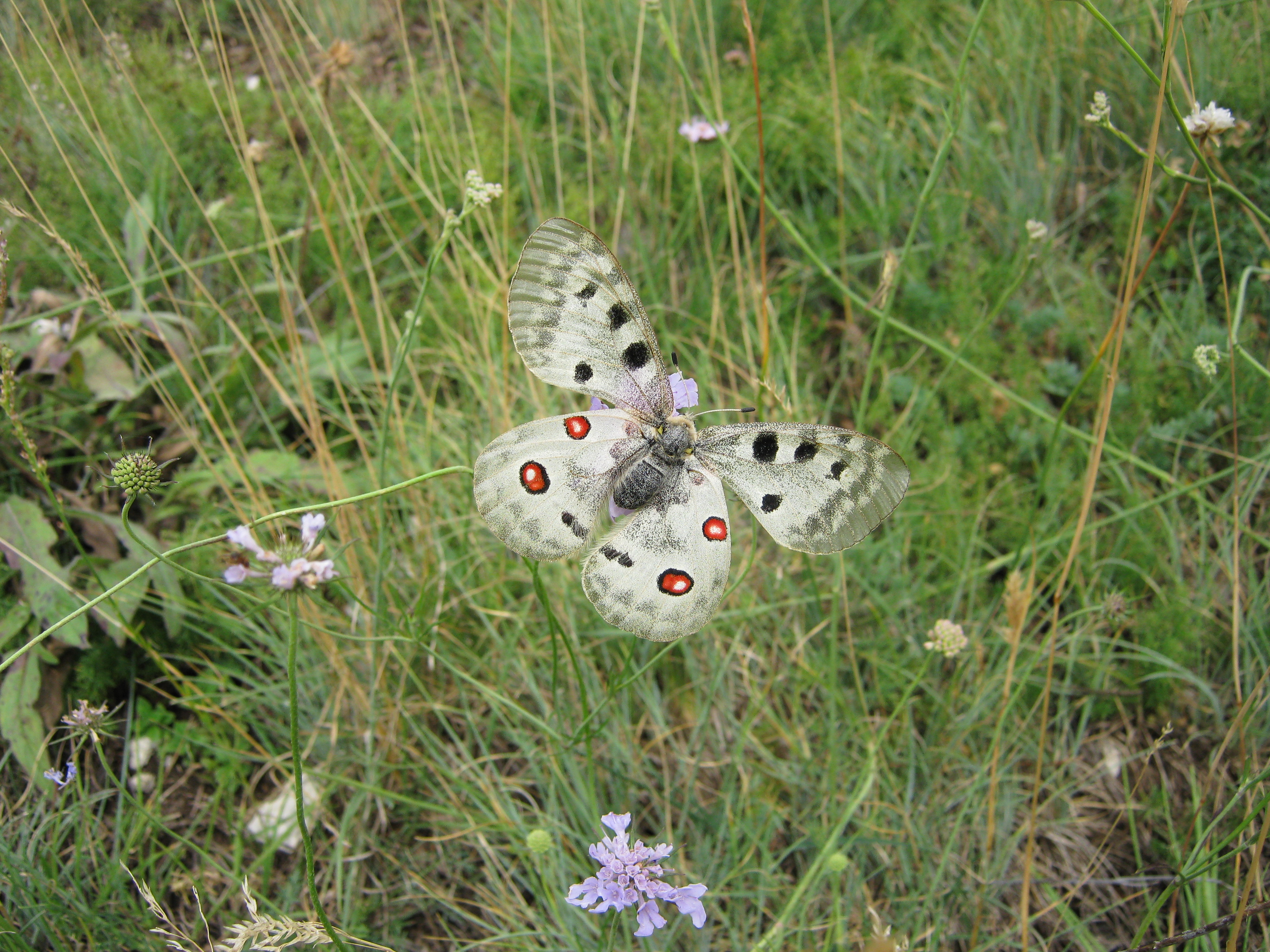
Apollo Butterfly in Gran Sasso

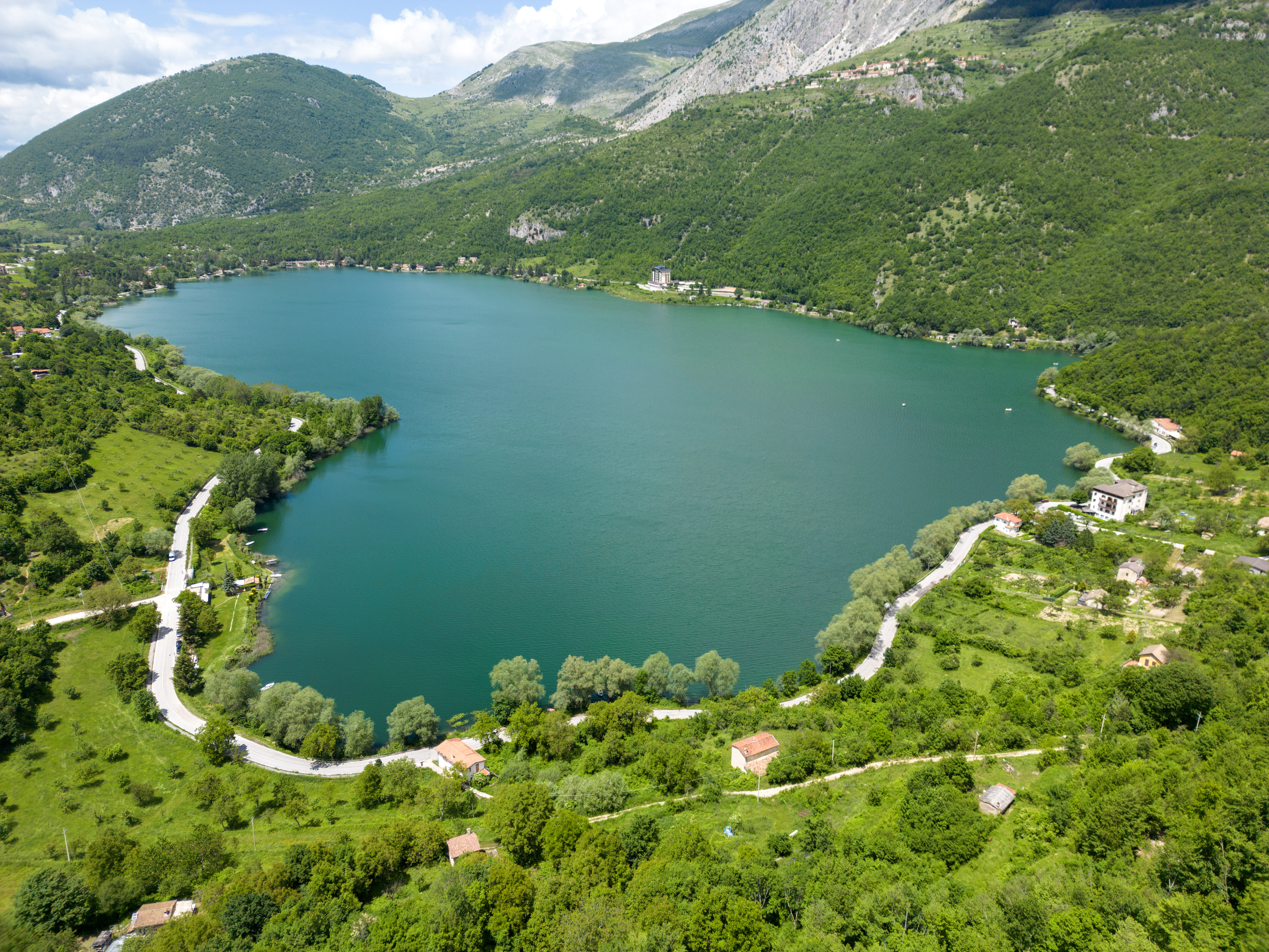
Lake Scanno

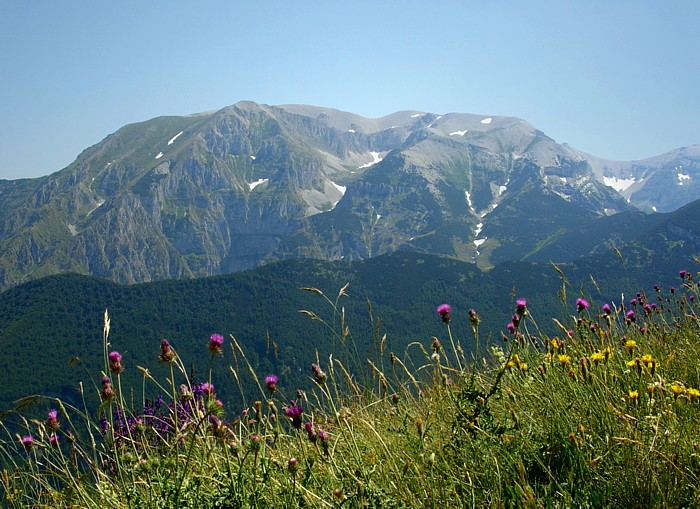
Maiella massif

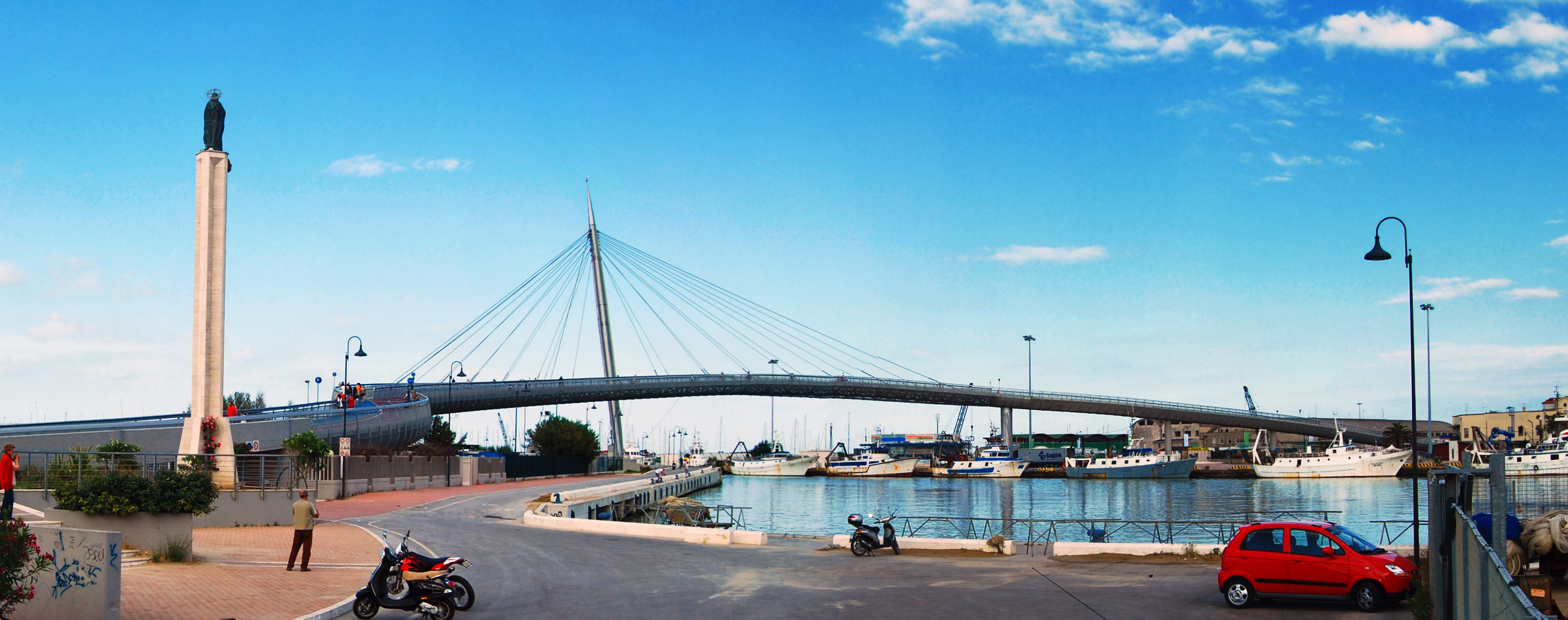
Ponte del mare in Pescara

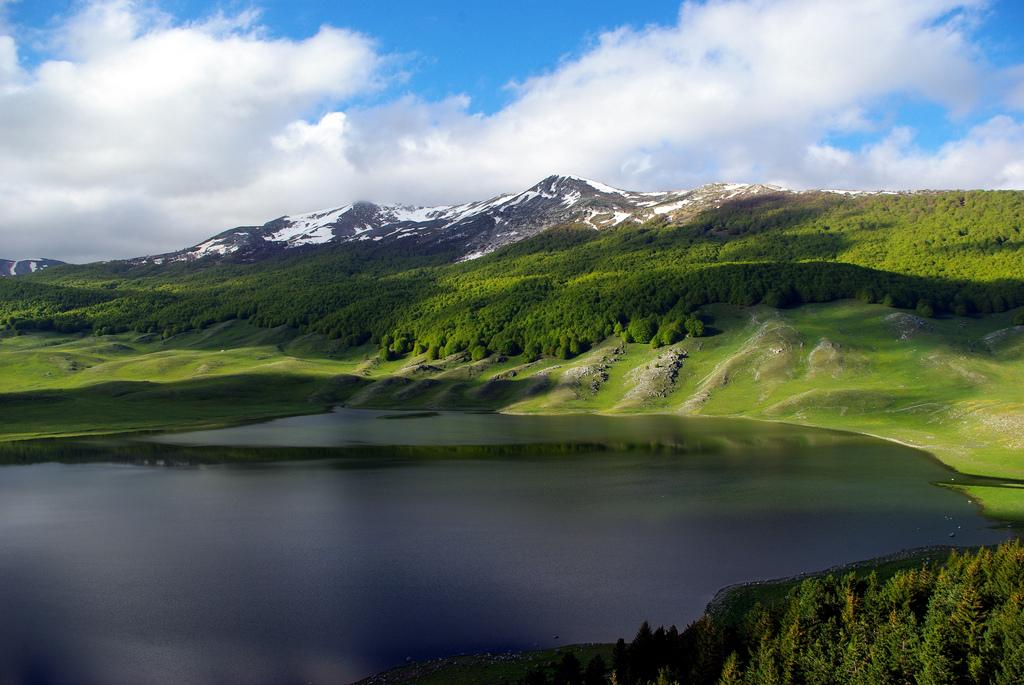
Campo Felice

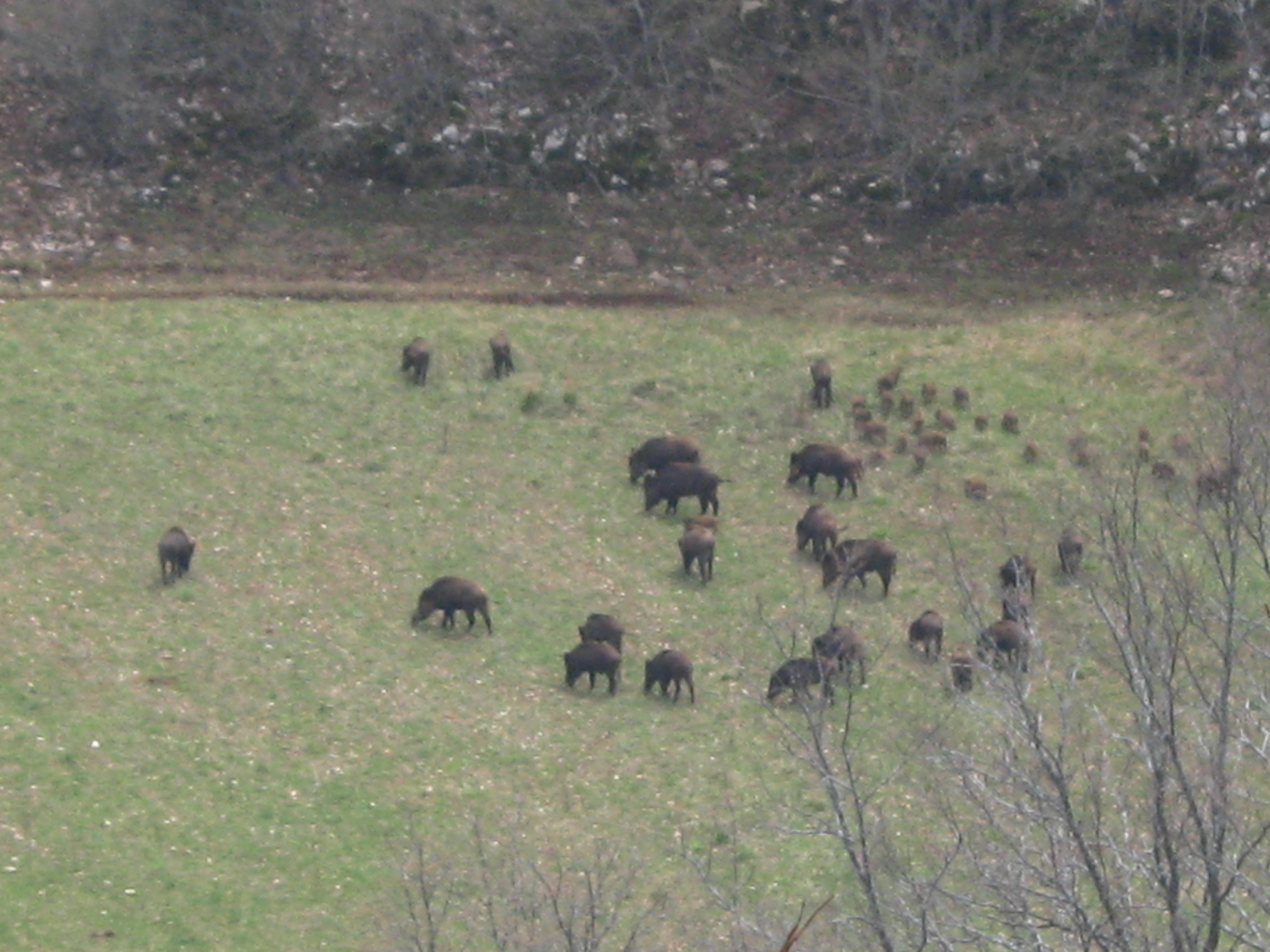
Abruzzo Wild boars

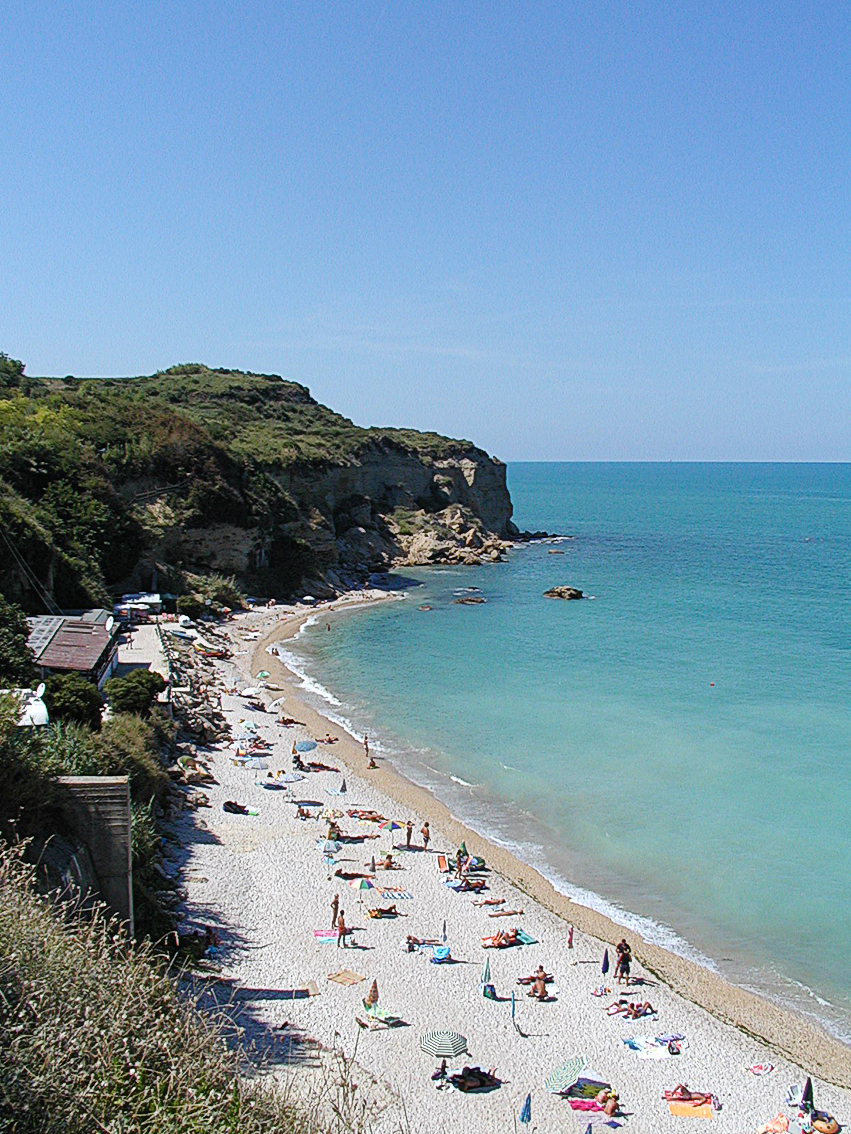
Ortona seaside

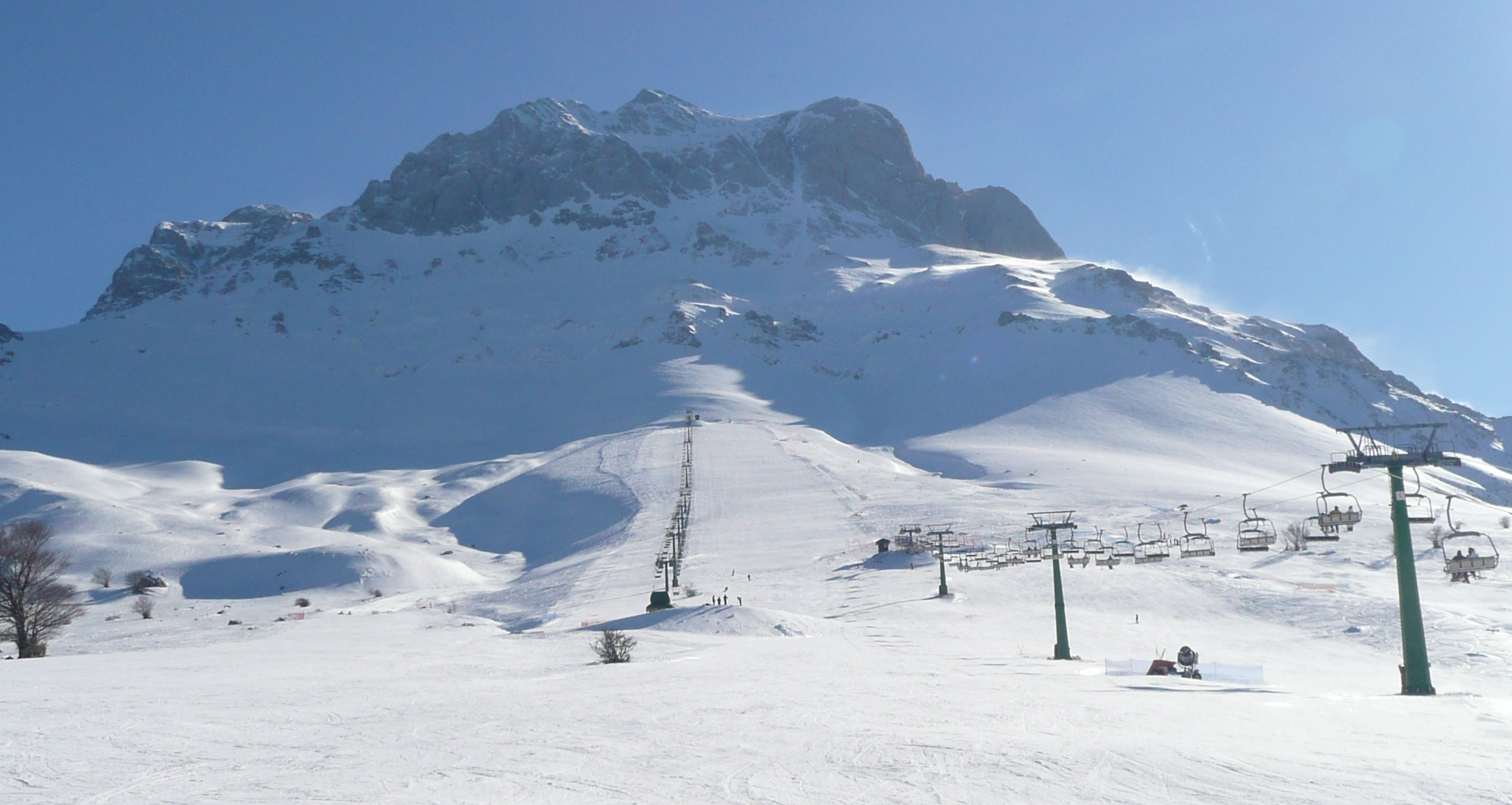
Prati di Tivo ski slopes

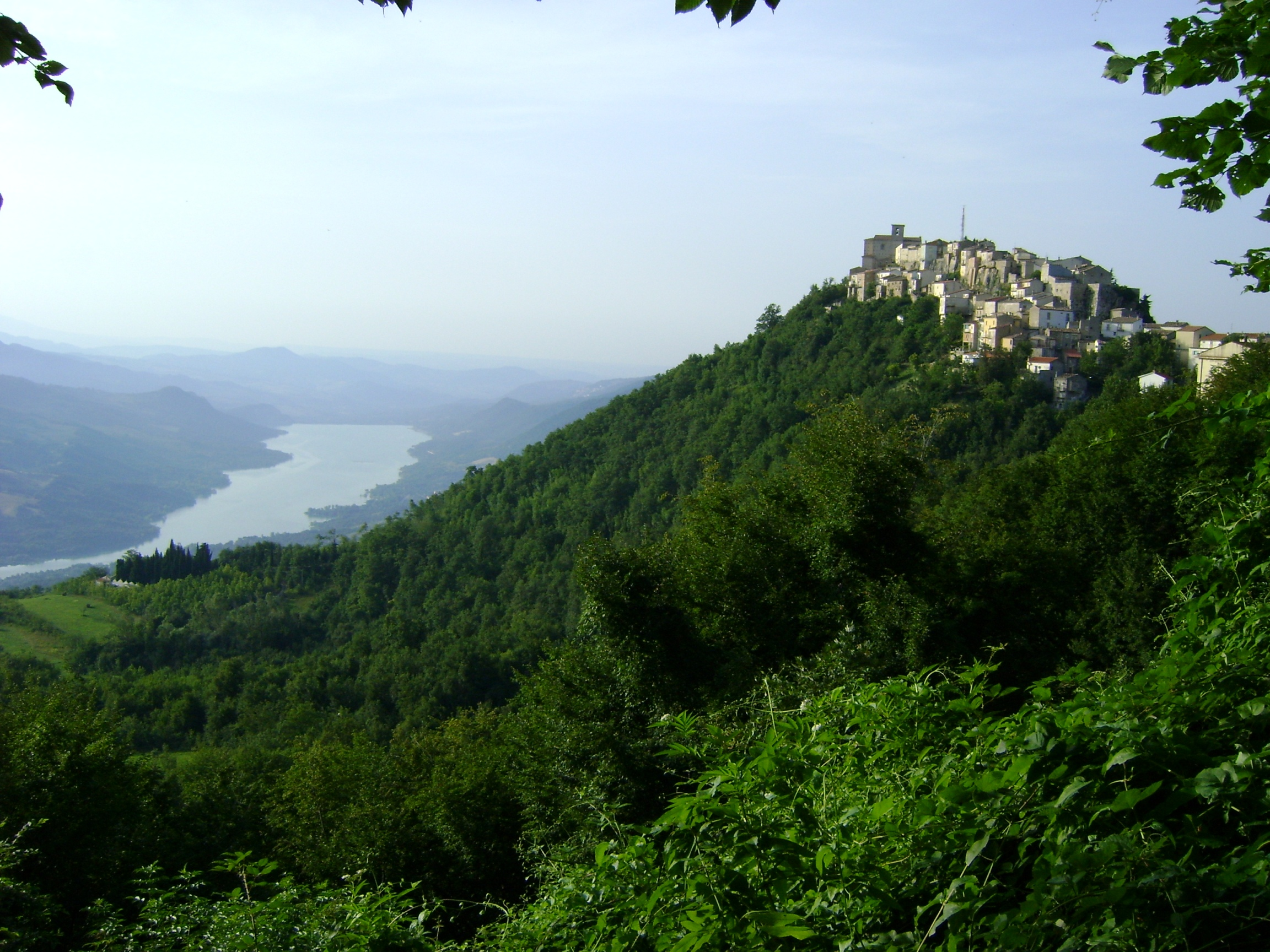
Monteferrante

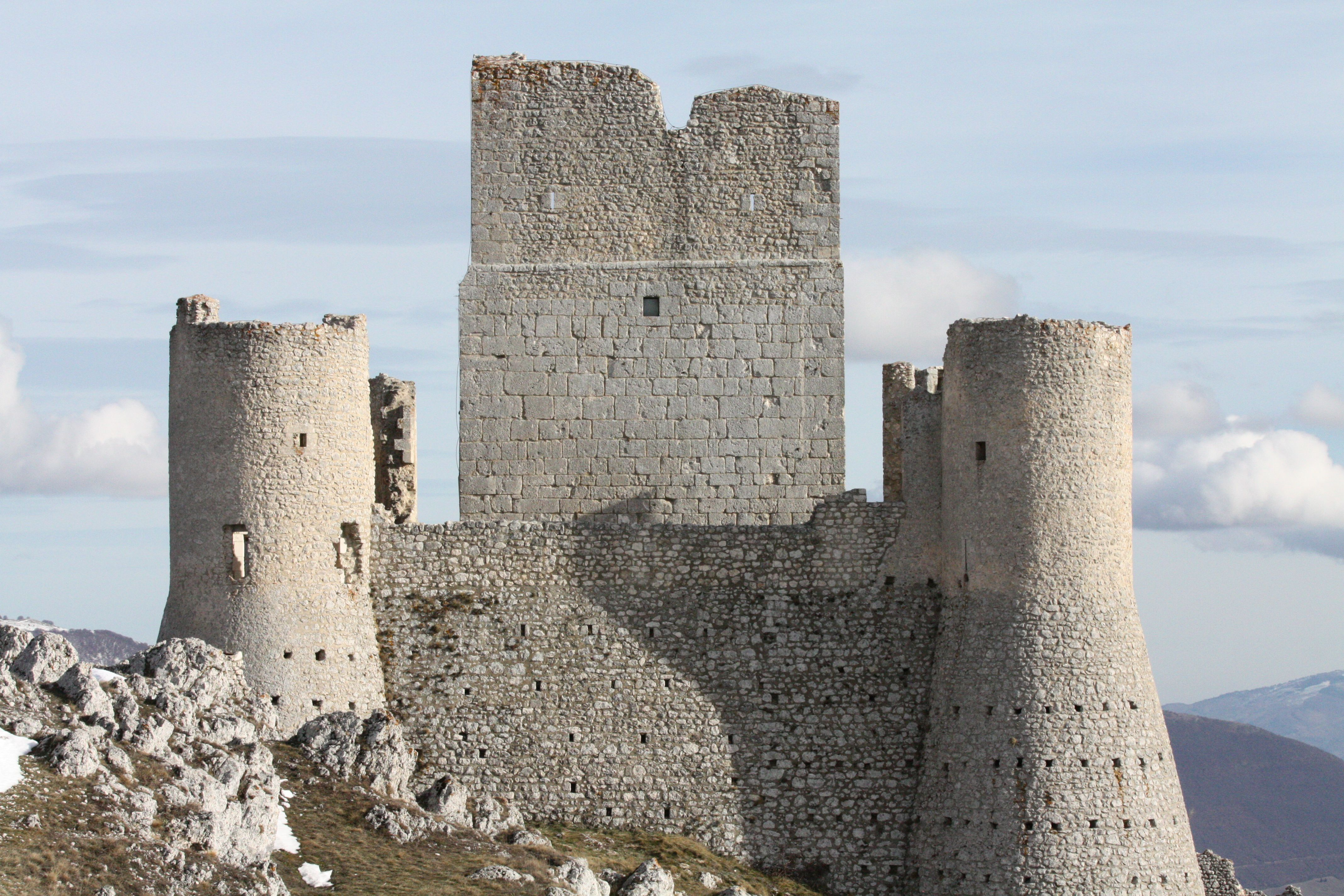
Rocca Calascio

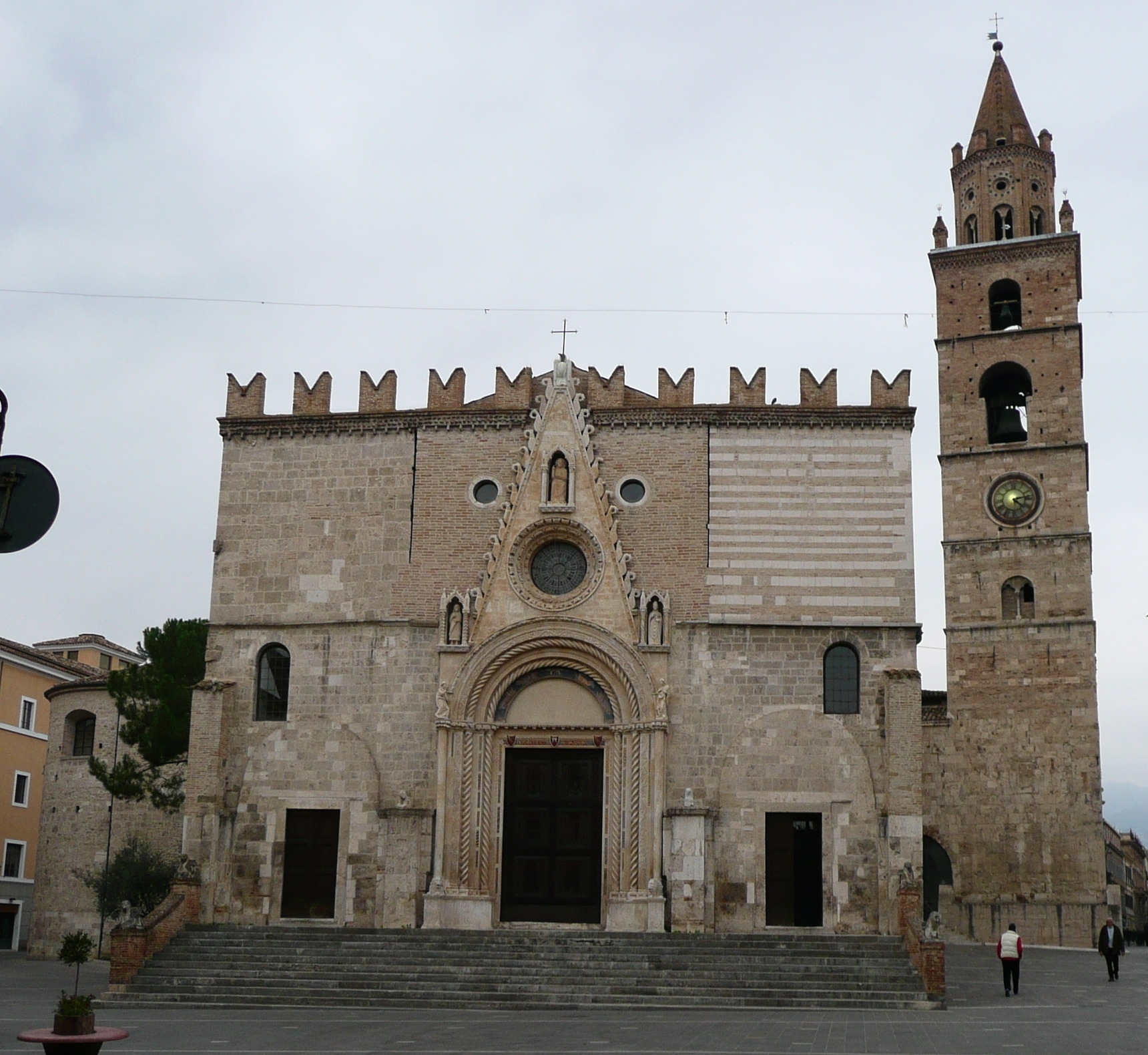
Duomo of Teramo

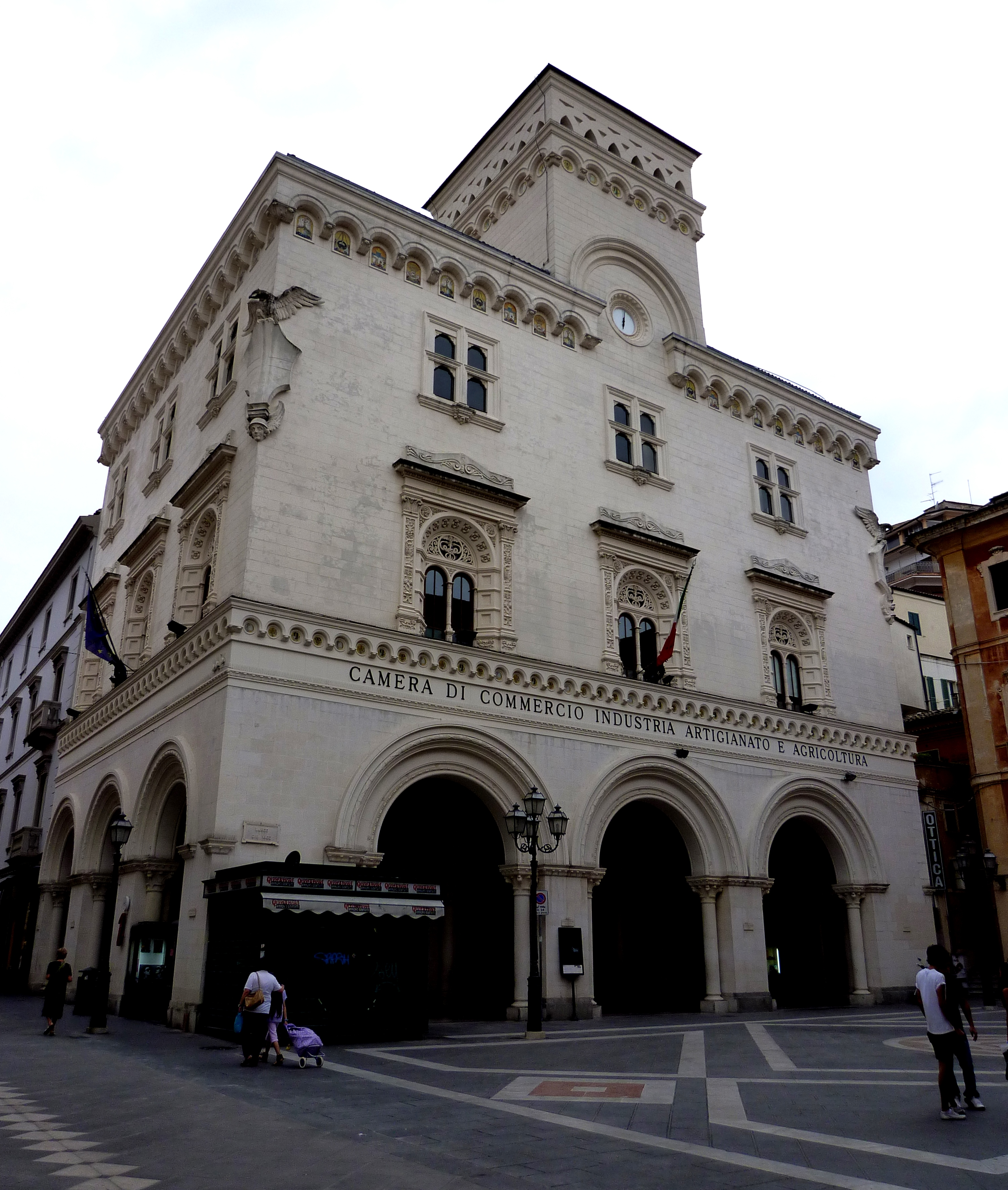
Chieti

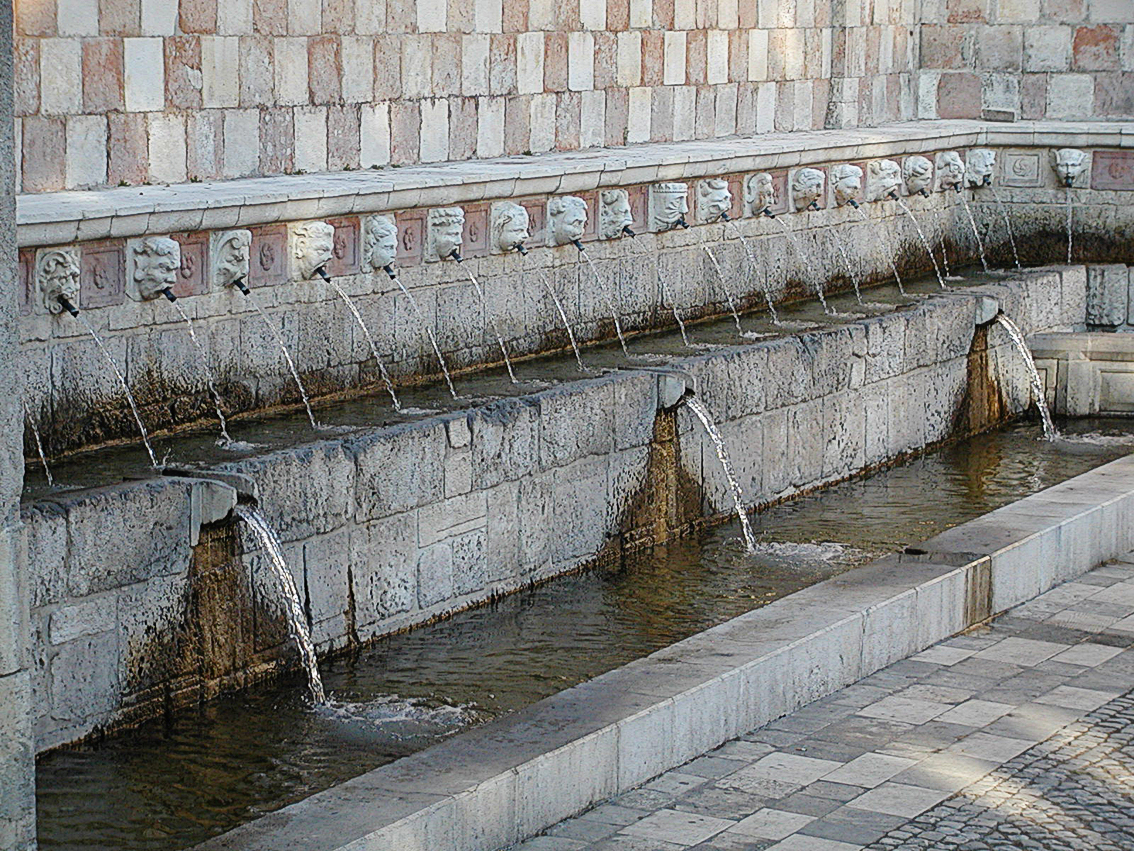
L'Aquila 99 Spouts Fountain

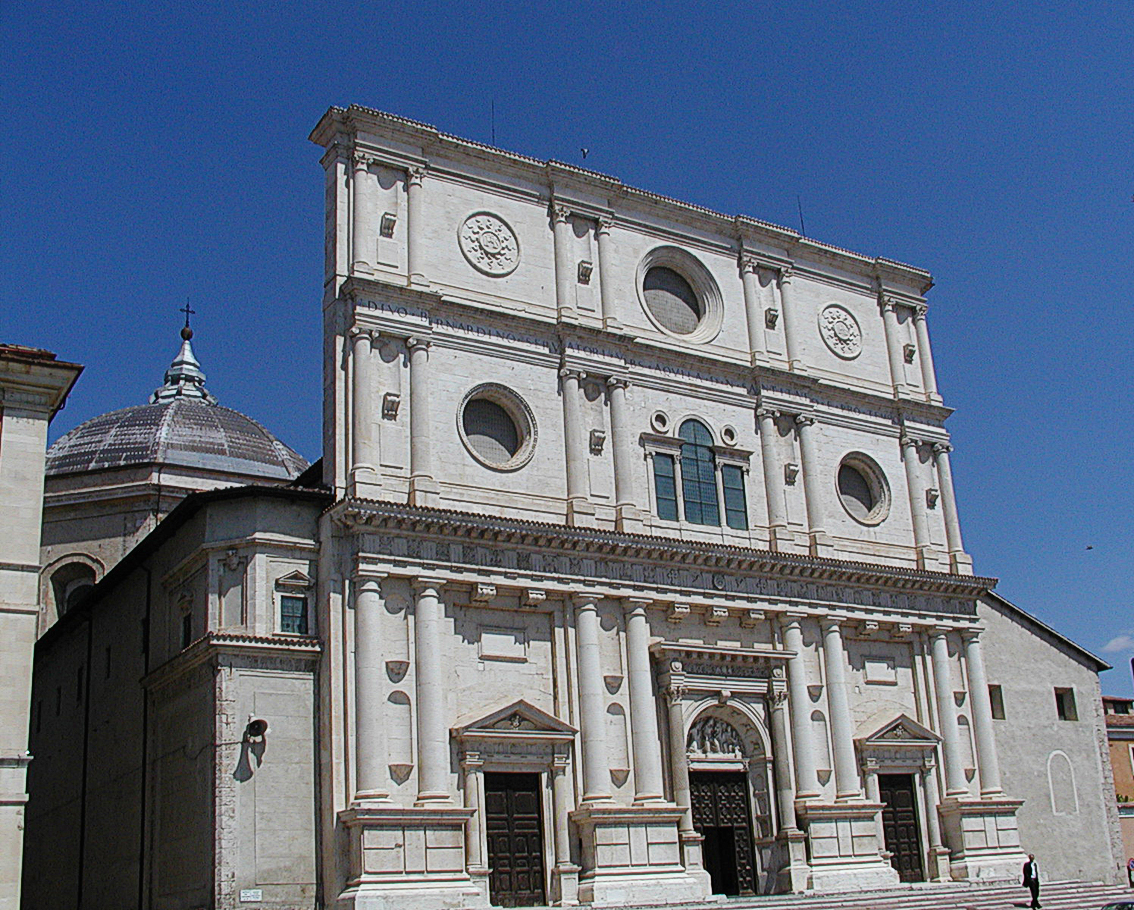
San Bernardino Basilica in L'Aquila

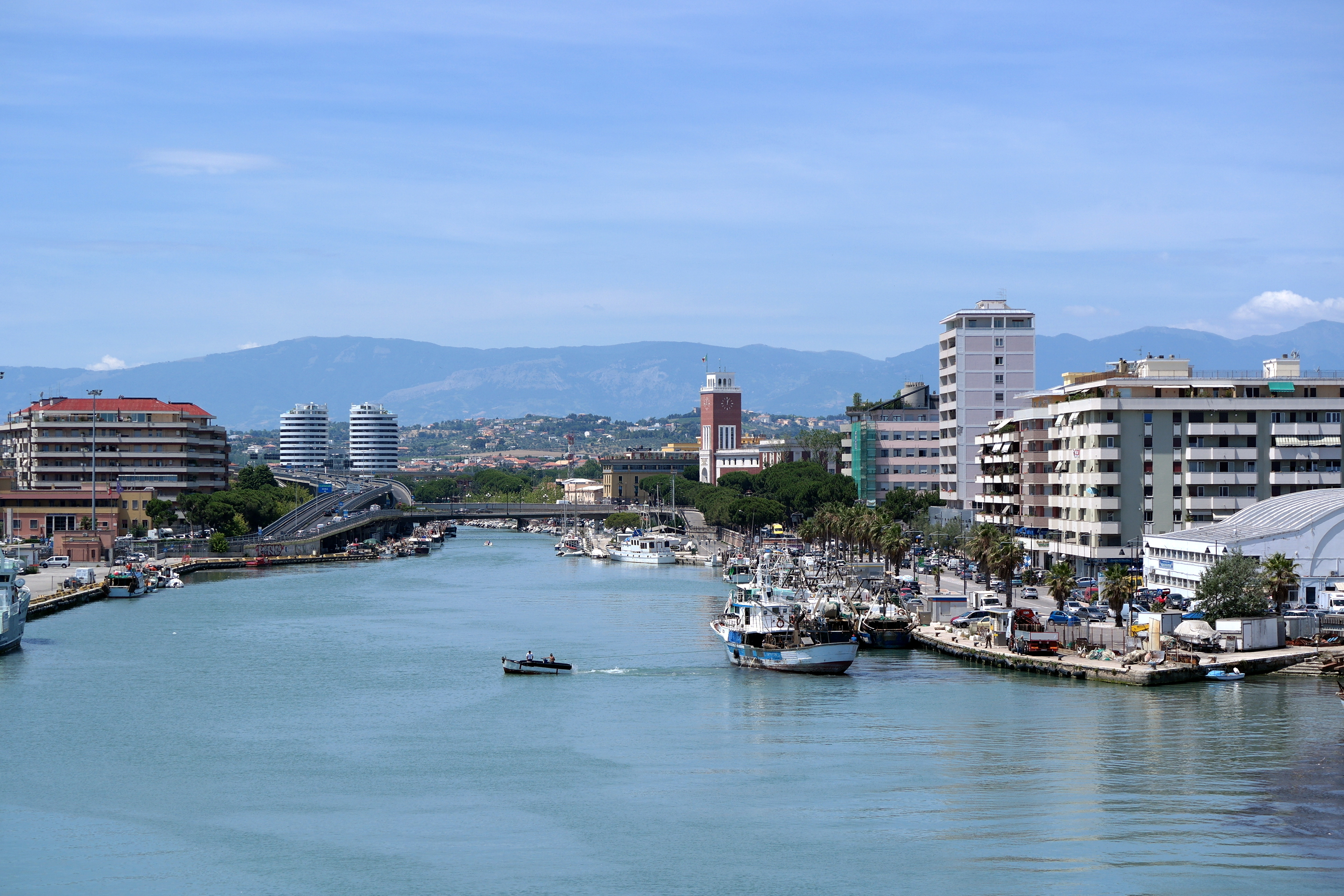
Pescara

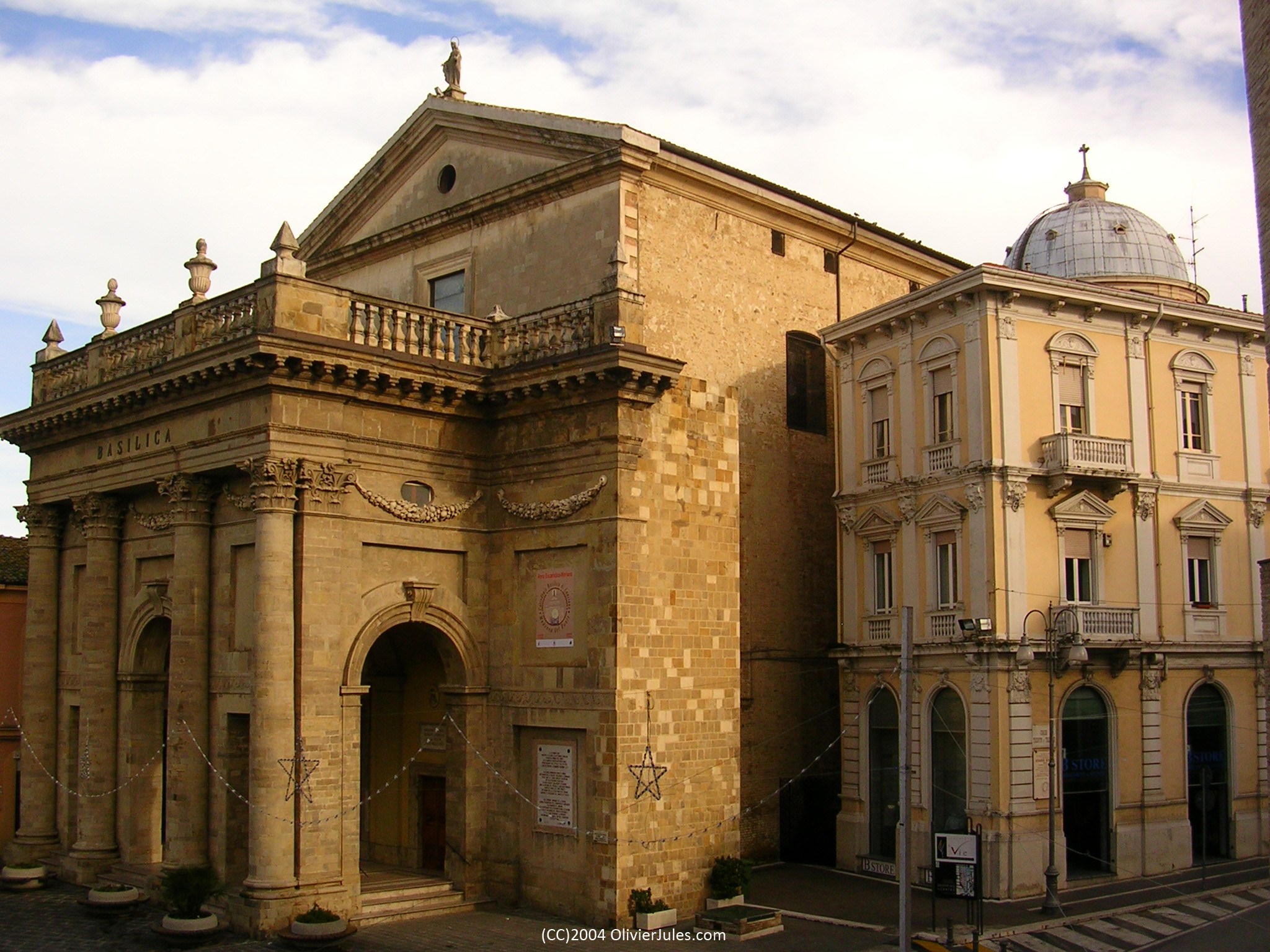
Lanciano basilica

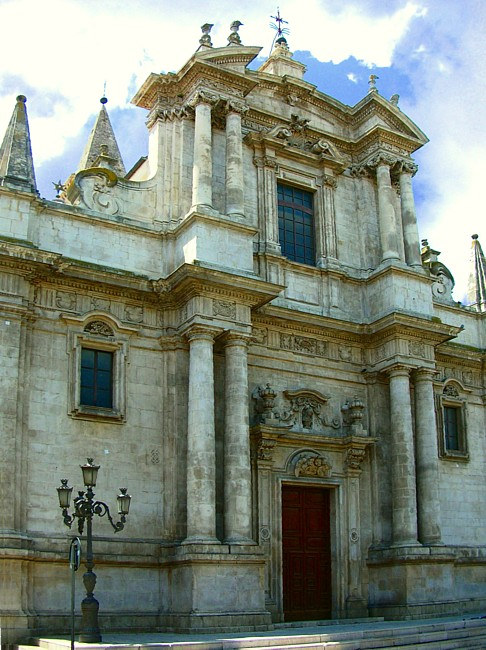
Church of SS Annunziata in Sulmona

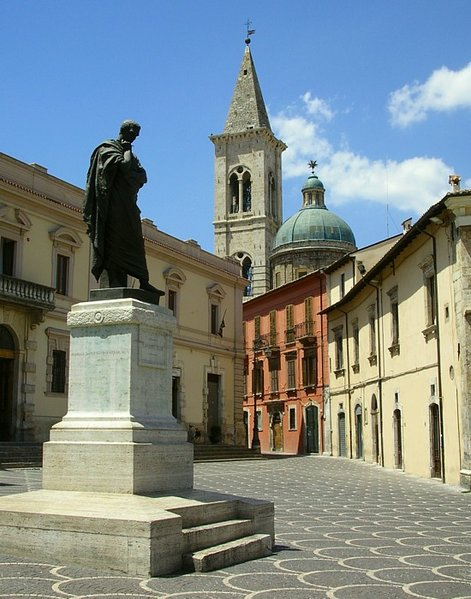
Sulmona

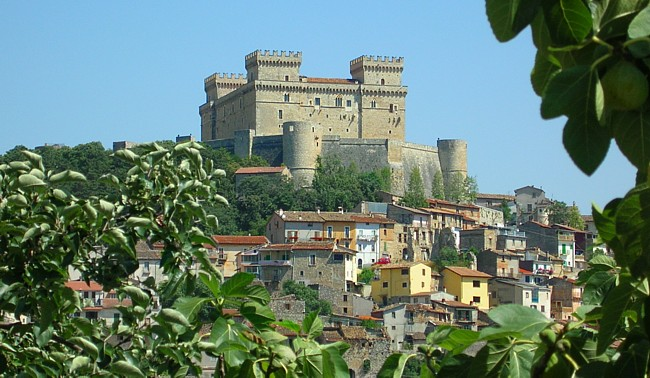
Celano

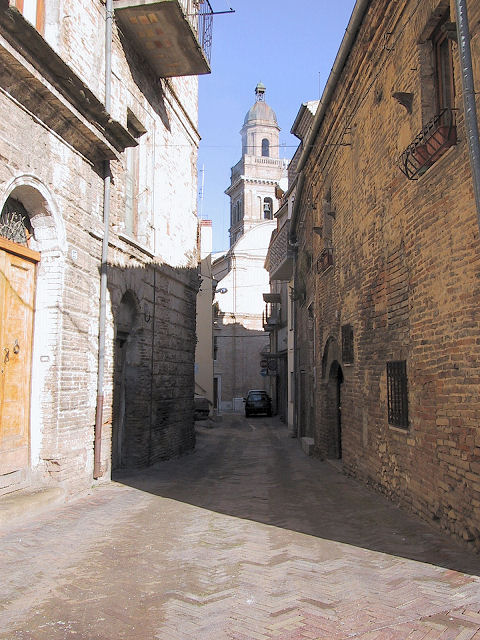
Casalbordino

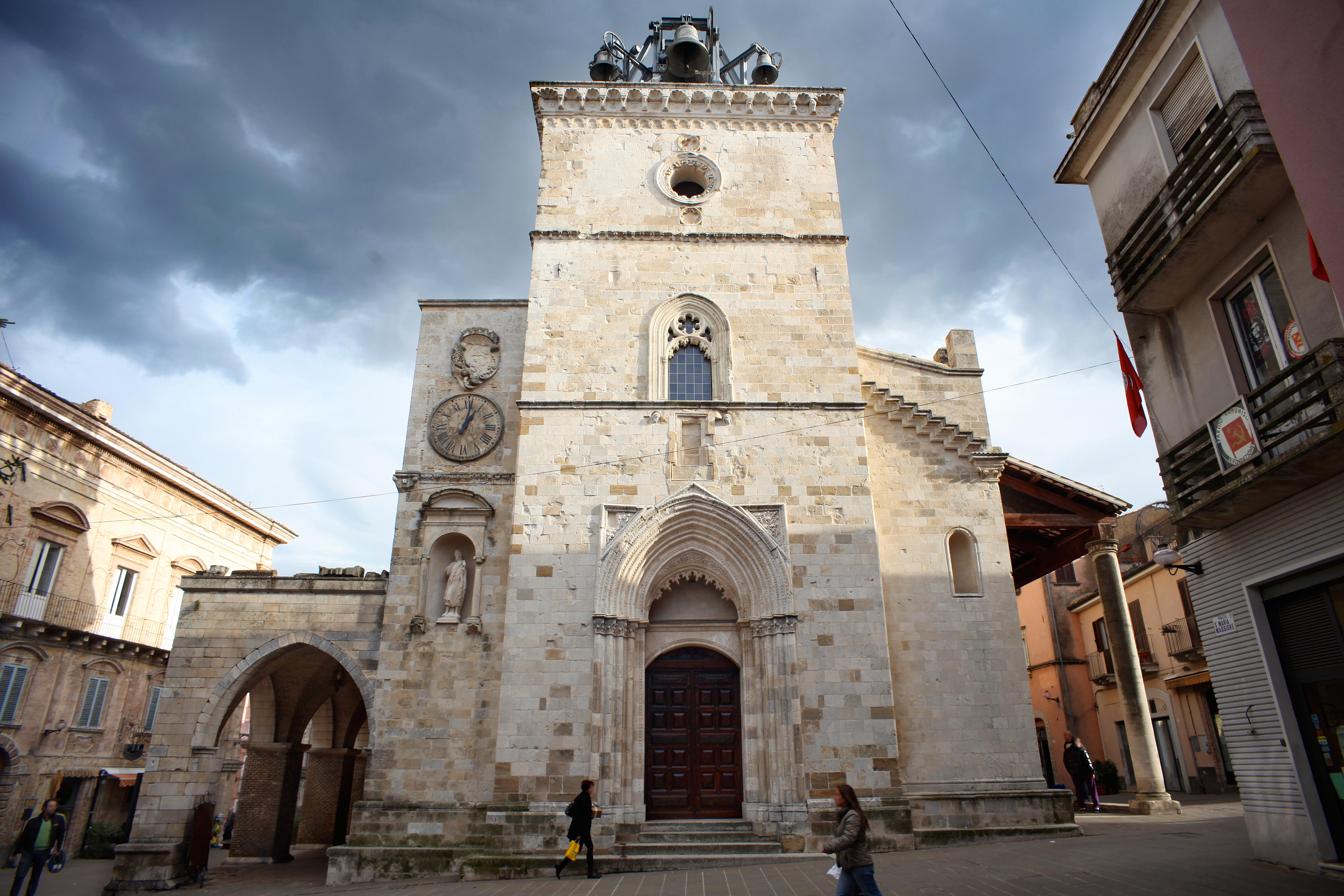
Guardiagrele

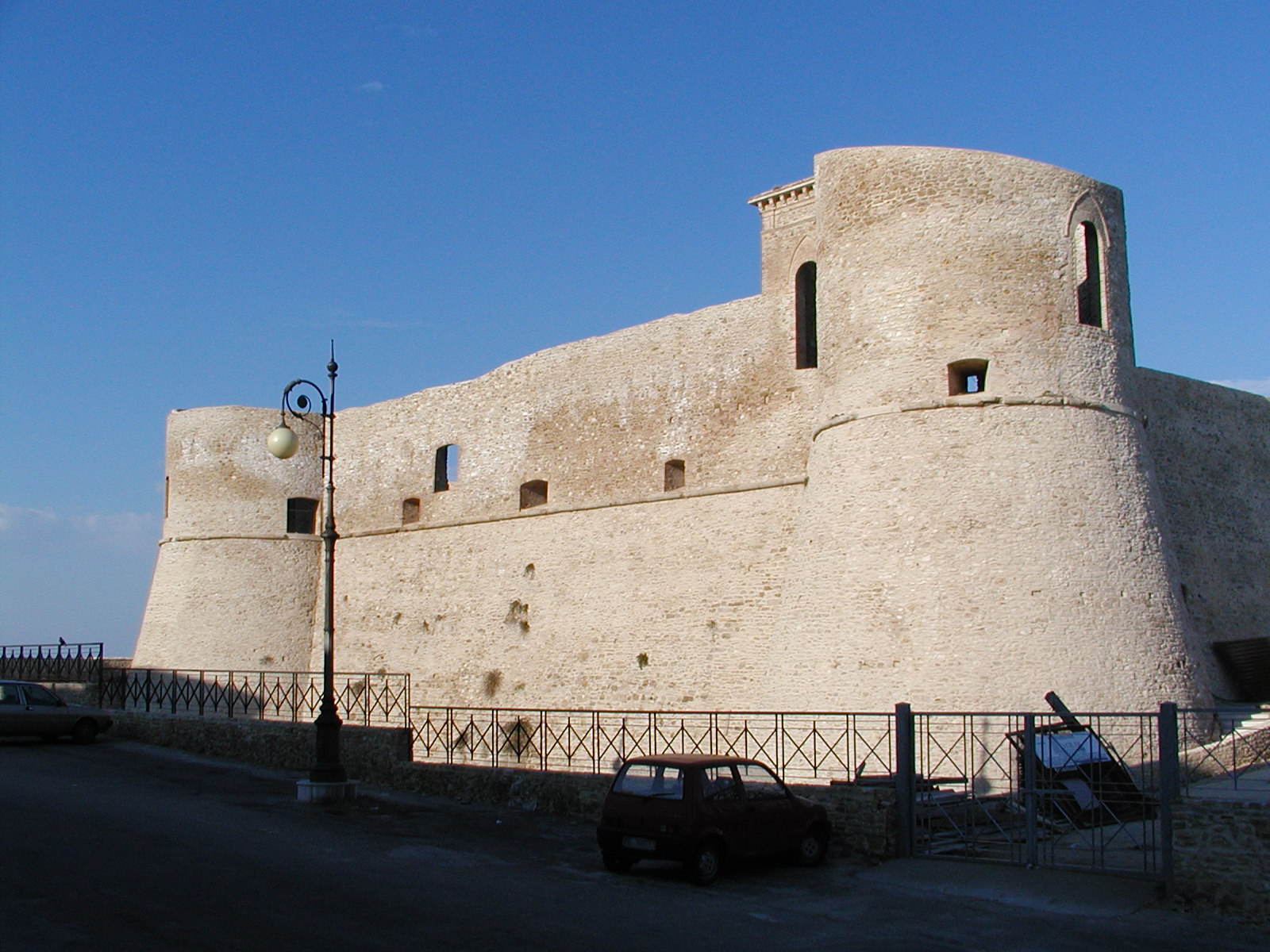
Ortona

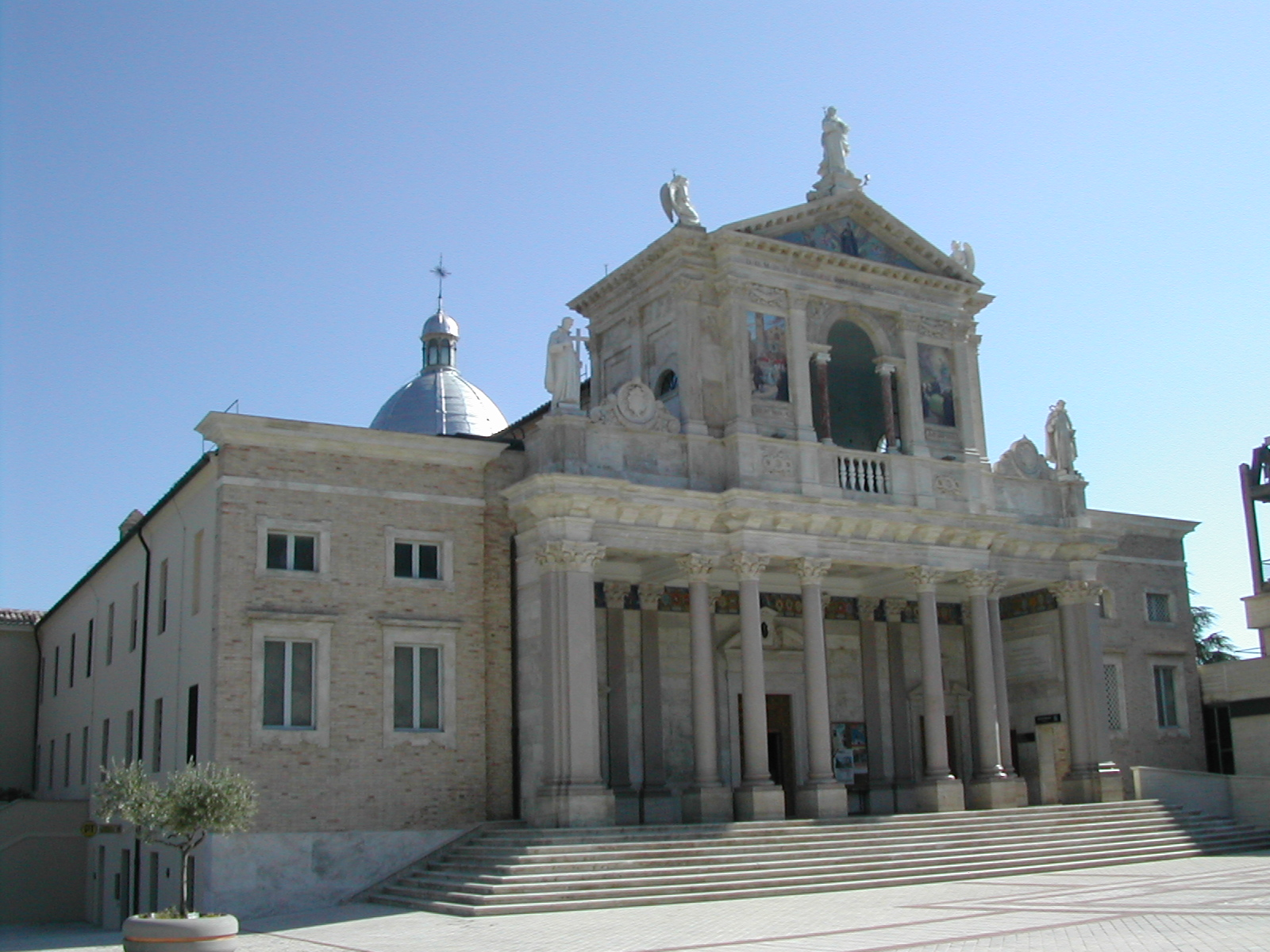
Shrine of Gabriel of Our Lady of Sorrows

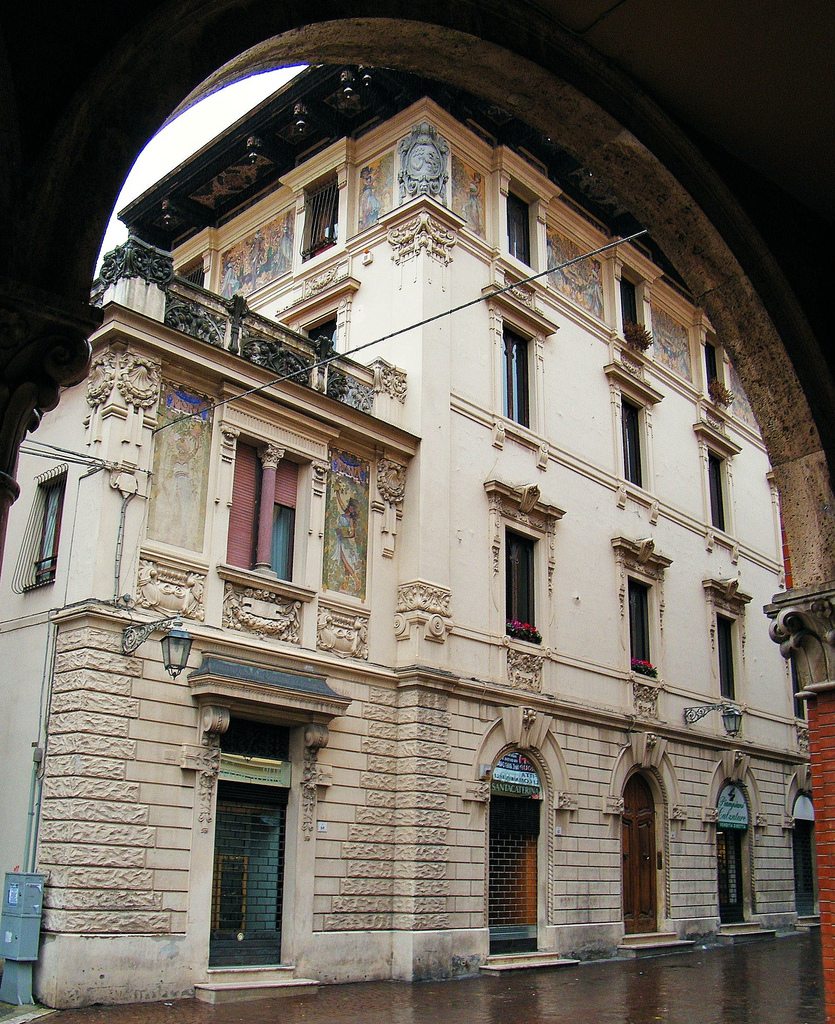
Palazzo Savini in Teramo

== See also ==
- 2009 L'Aquila earthquake
