= Civitella Alfedena =

- Comune
- Comune di Civitella Alfedena
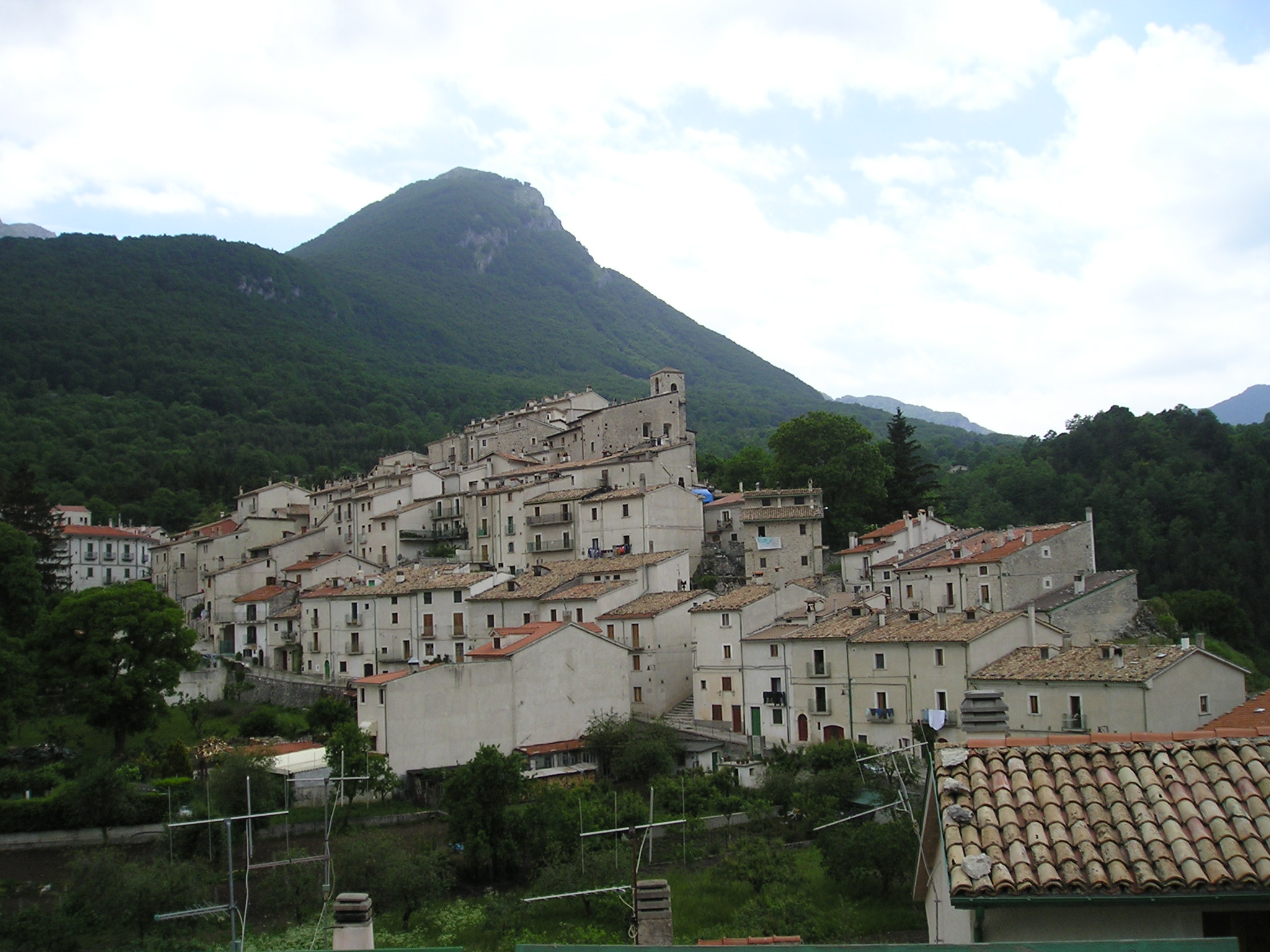

- Location within Italy Location within Abruzzo
- Coordinates: 41°45′59″N 13°56′37″E
- Country: Italy
- Region: Abruzzo
- Province: L'Aquila (AQ)

Government
  - Mayor: Giuseppe Rossi

Area
  - Total: 29.49 km^{2} (11.39 sq mi)
- Elevation: 1,123 m (3,684 ft)

Population (30 June 2017)
  - Total: 286
  - Density: 9.70/km^{2} (25.1/sq mi)
- Demonym: Civitellesi
- Time zone: UTC+1 (CET)
  - Summer (DST): UTC+2 (CEST)
- Postal code: 67030
- Dialing code: 0864
- Saint day: 13 December
- Website: Official website

Civitella Alfedena is a small town and comune in the province of L'Aquila (Abruzzo, central Italy). It is located in the heart of the National Park of Abruzzo, Lazio e Molise.

== Physical Geography ==
Territory

The municipality lies in the Alto Sangro basin, amidst the Monti Marsicani mountain range, at the foot of Mount Sterpi d'Alto (1,966 m), overlooking Lake Barrea, in the Abruzzo, Lazio, and Molise National Park and including the Camosciara Strict Nature Reserve. The main waterway in the area is the Sangro River, which receives one of its first tributaries, the Scerto, in the municipality of Civitella Alfedena.

== History ==
Ancient age

The Alto Sangro area has been inhabited since the Upper Paleolithic, as attested by archaeological finds in the Achille Graziani cave. It is likely that the first inhabitants of the area were groups of hunters from lower altitudes, who periodically reached these mountains in search of flint and large prey. Furthermore, some ancient necropolises testify to the presence, at least since the first millennium BC, of settled populations who practiced both agriculture and livestock farming.

In fact, numerous burial sites have been discovered in the nearby towns of Val Fondillo and Colle Ciglio, all dating back to a period between the 6th and 5th centuries BC. With the process of Romanization that followed the Samnite Wars, transhumant pastoralism took hold in the Alto Sangro towards what is now northern Puglia.

Medieval age

The origins of the settlement of Civitella Alfedena coincided with the depopulation of Rocca Intramonti, an ancient settlement at the foot of the Camosciara, abandoned by its inhabitants between the late 14th and early 15th centuries.

Driving the area's economy during this historical period was the revival of the herd industry promoted by Alfonso I of Naples, who, by establishing the Royal Customs Office for the Sheep Herding of Puglia in 1447, reopened the sheep tracks.

Contemporary age

Civitella Alfedena, with a population of less than 1,000, was incorporated into the municipality of Villetta Barrea until 1853. Furthermore, the crisis in transhumant pastoralism, combined with population growth, contributed to the increase in overseas emigration, which peaked between the late 19th century and the early 20th century.

The Abruzzo National Park (now the Abruzzo, Lazio, and Molise National Park, PNALM) was established provisionally in 1922 and definitively in 1923. Civitella Alfedena was part of this park from its inception.

During World War II, the Gustav Line front was established just 9 km from Civitella Alfedena.

At the end of the war, the people of Civitella found themselves in dire poverty, and with the decline of the traditional economy, emigration resumed.

In 1951 the dam located in the neighbouring municipality of Barrea was completed and the related basin was flooded. The landscape of the place was therefore modified by transforming part of the course of the Sangro river into the current Lake Barrea, which also covered part of the territory of Civitella Alfedena. Today the lake, in addition to the production of hydroelectric energy, is also used for tourist and seaside purposes as well as a water reserve for fire-fighting aircraft. The old bridge over the Sangro which connected the town with the Via Marsicana now remains half-submerged, replaced by the new bridge over the lake.

Today, Civitella Alfedena is a tourist destination among the typical Abruzzo villages of the Abruzzo, Lazio, and Molise National Park and is also known for its wolf wildlife area and the Apennine Wolf Museum.

== Main sights ==
- "Lupo Appenninico Museum", dedicated to the history and the biology of the Apennine Mountains' wolf.

== Twin towns ==
- Canal San Bovo, Italy
