= Erminio Sipari =

Italian politician (1879–1968)

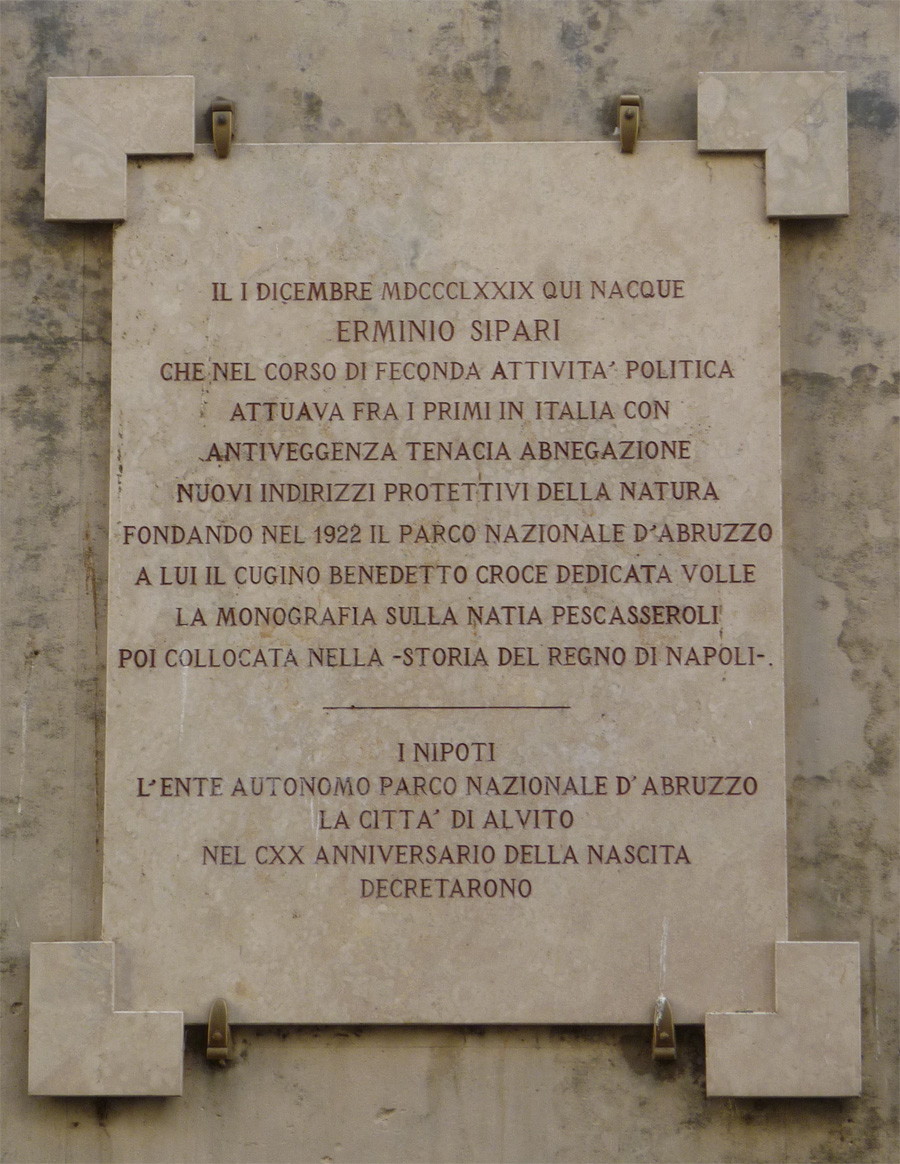
- Born: 1 December 1879; Alvito, Italy
- Died: 28 January 1968 (aged 88); Rome, Italy
- Occupations: Engineer, naturalist, politician and writer
- Spouse: Zelmira Galleano (1881–1971)
- Children: 2

Erminio Sipari (1 December 1879 – 28 January 1968) was an Italian politician and naturalist, author of studies on the preservation of nature and founder of Parco Nazionale d'Abruzzo, which he chaired from 1922 to 1933.

== Biography ==
Sipari was born in Alvito, Lazio. His family, well known in southern Italy, had many properties in Terra di Lavoro, Abruzzo and Apulia. His father was the brother of Luisa Sipari, the mother of Benedetto Croce, and his mother, Cristina Cappelli, came from a noble family. Erminio studied in Rome and graduated in civil engineering at the University of Turin, after which he specialized in electrical engineering in Liège. Back in Italy in 1905, he established his own engineering firm, based in Rome and Pescasseroli.

In 1913, when Sipari was first elected in the Italian Parliament, he took the opportunity to draw attention to the real threat of extinction of important species, such as the Abruzzo chamois and the Marsican brown bear, and proposed the creation of a national park in the area of Marsica. In 1921 he was appointed as Undersecretary of State to the Italian Navy. In the same year, he founded the "Ente Autonomo of the Parco Nazionale d'Abruzzo", who leased 5 square kilometres of land to be protected in the district of Opi. In September 1922 Sipari opened the Park in Pescasseroli. After, the park was recognized by Italian law (January 1923).

As its president, Sipari argued that the Abruzzo National Park must protect fauna and flora, but also allow the birth of tourism. He was able to create and manage a park based on sustainable development. He wrote numerous articles on the birth of the National Park and also a comprehensive report, called Relazione Sipari (1926), which at the time was considered the main promoter of nature conservation in Italy.

== Bibliography ==
- Lorenzo Arnone Sipari (ed.), Scritti scelti di Erminio Sipari sul Parco Nazionale d'Abruzzo (1922-1933), Temi, Trento 2011;
- Luigi Piccioni, Erminio Sipari. Origini sociali e opere dell'artefice del Parco Nazionale d'Abruzzo, University of Camerino 1997;
- James Sievert, The Origins of Nature Conservation in Italy, Peter Lang, Bern 2000, pp. 165–181.
