= Barrea =

- Comune
- Comune di Barrea
- Location within Italy Location within Abruzzo
- Coordinates: 41°45′25″N 13°59′36″E
- Country: Italy
- Region: Abruzzo
- Province: L'Aquila (AQ)

Government
  - Mayor: Aldo Di Benedetto (La Vallis Regia che vorrei)

Area
  - Total: 87.05 km^{2} (33.61 sq mi)
- Elevation: 1,060 m (3,480 ft)

Population (2024)
  - Total: 696
  - Density: 8.00/km^{2} (20.7/sq mi)
- Demonym: Barreani
- Time zone: UTC+1 (CET)
  - Summer (DST): UTC+2 (CEST)
- Postal code: 67030
- Dialing code: 0864
- Patron saint: St. Thomas
- Saint day: December 21
- Website: Official website

Barrea (Abruzzese: Varréa) is a comune in the province of L'Aquila in the Abruzzo region of Italy.

It is located on the shore of the Lago di Barrea, a lake created after World War II due to the building of a dam on the river Sangro.

== History ==
The village of Barrea descends from the pre-Roman population of the Samnites, who linked their destinies to the village. Currently, along the shores of the lake or in the nearby archaeological site of Alfedena, traces abound from this period. There is a document from the year 996 in which the ancient name of Barrea, Vallis Regia, first appears. This document also mentions that Barrea was given to the Duke of Spoleto during the dark feudal times in Italy, a period noted for its anarchic regimes and barbaric raids.

Perhaps mainly to protect themselves from the fierce raid of the Huns, the inhabitants of the valley floor sheltered near a Benedictine monastery in a strategic position on the precipice of the river Sangro. Even today the monastery still exists and has withstood the ravages of man and the assault of time and the elements. In the following centuries, the inhabitants of Barrea built a tangle of practically impregnable houses along the southwestern side of the valley. Everything is protected by nature on one side and by observation towers, one round and one square, and defensive walls on the other. Historic records of this town mirror other examples found in Italy: bloody wars, rivalries and even devastating earthquakes.

One side of the original, central castle was protected from invaders by natural means, utilizing the impassably steep slope of the mountain; two stone castle gates afforded other protection to the castle and the homes that were built within its walls, dug into the slides of the mountain and giving out through front entrances facing on narrow, twisting, steep stone alleys.

Its location surrounded by the Apennines would have prevented Barrea's development into an industrial area had not other economic obstacles also existed; historically, residents existed by tending small farms in plots on the mountainside. A major emigration took place after the earthquake of 1984, when many residents declined to return to the homes that were ruined in the tremor. Many of the homes have been bought by tourists, who enjoy Barrea's location on the brow of a mountainside, giving out over the Sangro valley, but there are fewer than 1,000 permanent inhabitants.

Today, Barrea is at the center of the National Park of Abruzzo, Lazio and Molise, a natural area rich in wildlife and recreation and lacking any aspect of urban commercialization. The village contains many monuments to its sufferings in World War II, when it was subjected to Allied bombings.

== Climate ==
Climate data for Barrea, elevation 1,000 m (3,300 ft), (1951–2000)
Month	Jan	Feb	Mar	Apr	May	Jun	Jul	Aug	Sep	Oct	Nov	Dec	Year
Record high °C (°F)	15.2 (59.4)	20.3 (68.5)	20.0 (68.0)	23.5 (74.3)	27.9 (82.2)	33.2 (91.8)	36.9 (98.4)	33.6 (92.5)	29.2 (84.6)	25.2 (77.4)	21.8 (71.2)	17.5 (63.5)	36.9 (98.4)
Mean daily maximum °C (°F)	5.9 (42.6)	7.2 (45.0)	9.6 (49.3)	12.9 (55.2)	18.2 (64.8)	21.9 (71.4)	25.2 (77.4)	25.5 (77.9)	20.8 (69.4)	16.1 (61.0)	10.5 (50.9)	6.3 (43.3)	15.0 (59.0)
Daily mean °C (°F)	1.9 (35.4)	2.8 (37.0)	4.9 (40.8)	8.0 (46.4)	12.6 (54.7)	15.9 (60.6)	18.6 (65.5)	18.9 (66.0)	15.0 (59.0)	10.7 (51.3)	6.2 (43.2)	2.4 (36.3)	9.8 (49.7)
Mean daily minimum °C (°F)	−2.1 (28.2)	−1.6 (29.1)	0.3 (32.5)	3.1 (37.6)	7.0 (44.6)	9.9 (49.8)	12.0 (53.6)	12.3 (54.1)	9.2 (48.6)	5.4 (41.7)	1.8 (35.2)	−1.5 (29.3)	4.7 (40.4)
Record low °C (°F)	−14.5 (5.9)	−16.5 (2.3)	−11.7 (10.9)	−7.5 (18.5)	−2.4 (27.7)	2.3 (36.1)	2.6 (36.7)	4.3 (39.7)	−0.5 (31.1)	−5.0 (23.0)	−10.9 (12.4)	−13.3 (8.1)	−16.5 (2.3)
Average precipitation mm (inches)	108.5 (4.27)	104.2 (4.10)	86.7 (3.41)	86.5 (3.41)	67.7 (2.67)	48.0 (1.89)	39.1 (1.54)	37.0 (1.46)	78.3 (3.08)	109.9 (4.33)	166.6 (6.56)	151.0 (5.94)	1,083.5 (42.66)
Average precipitation days	10.3	9.3	9.9	10.7	10.1	8.0	6.0	5.5	7.3	9.1	11.4	11.7	109.3
Source: Regione Abruzzo

== Gallery ==
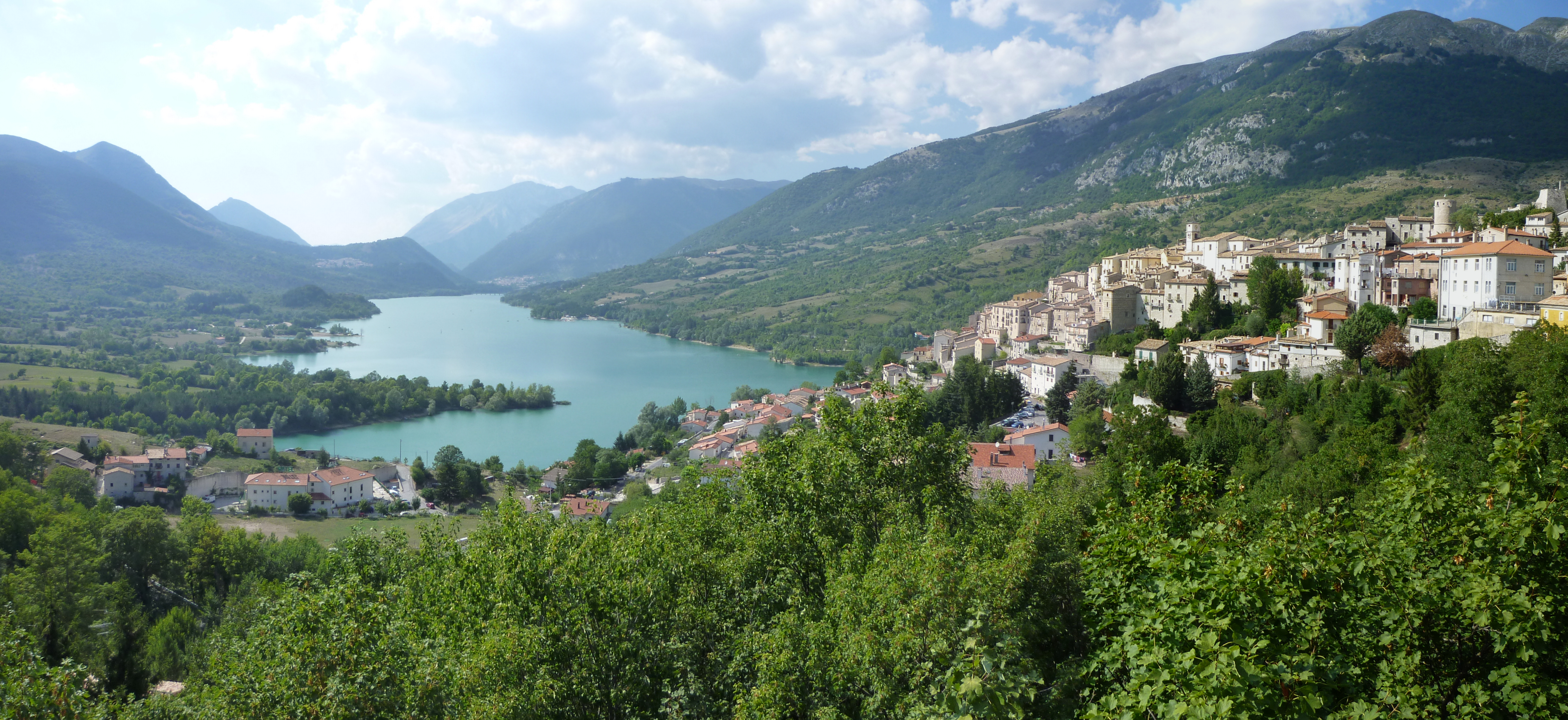
Panoramic view.

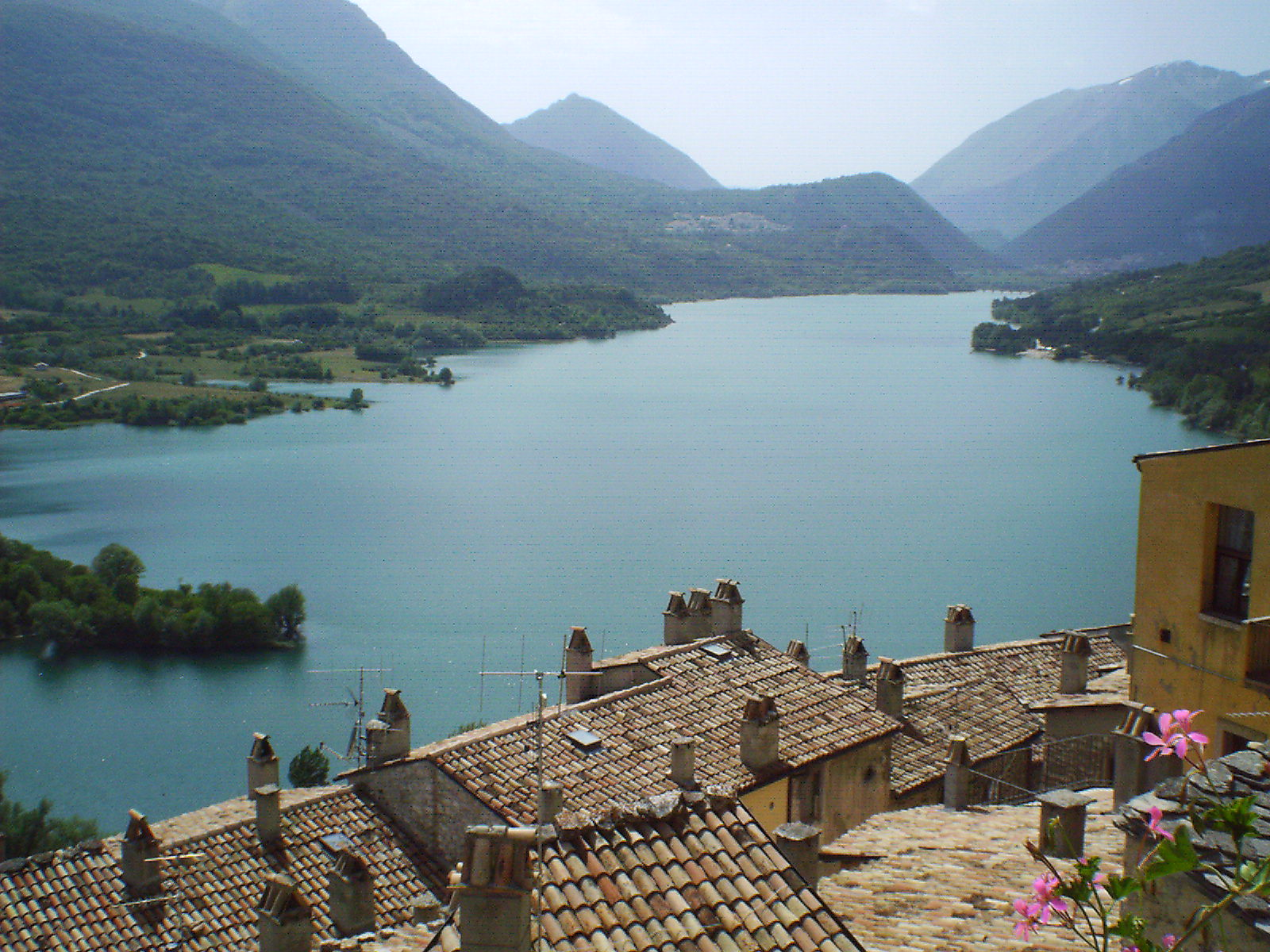
Lake of Barrea.

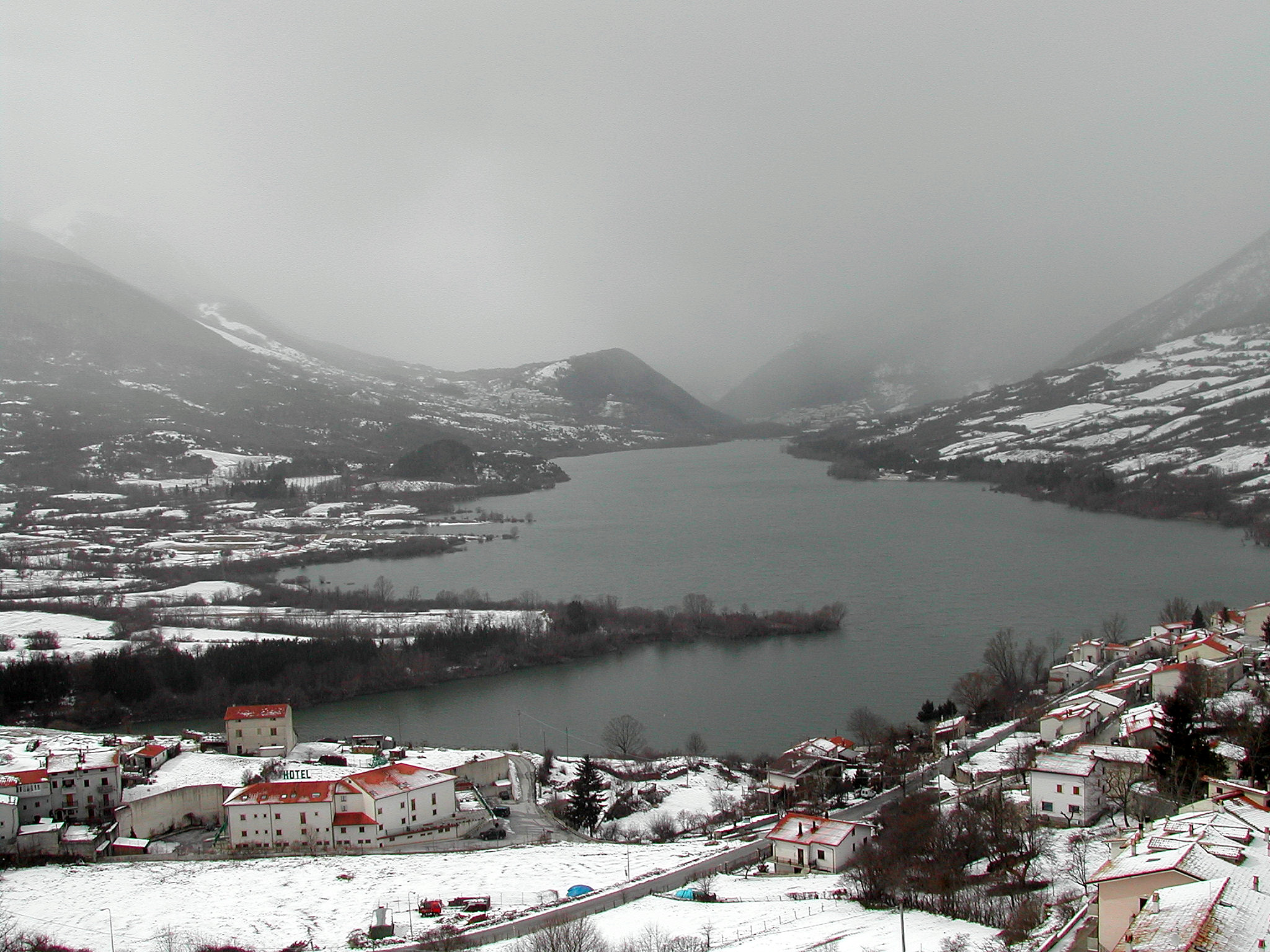
The lake during winter.

Church of the Purgatory.

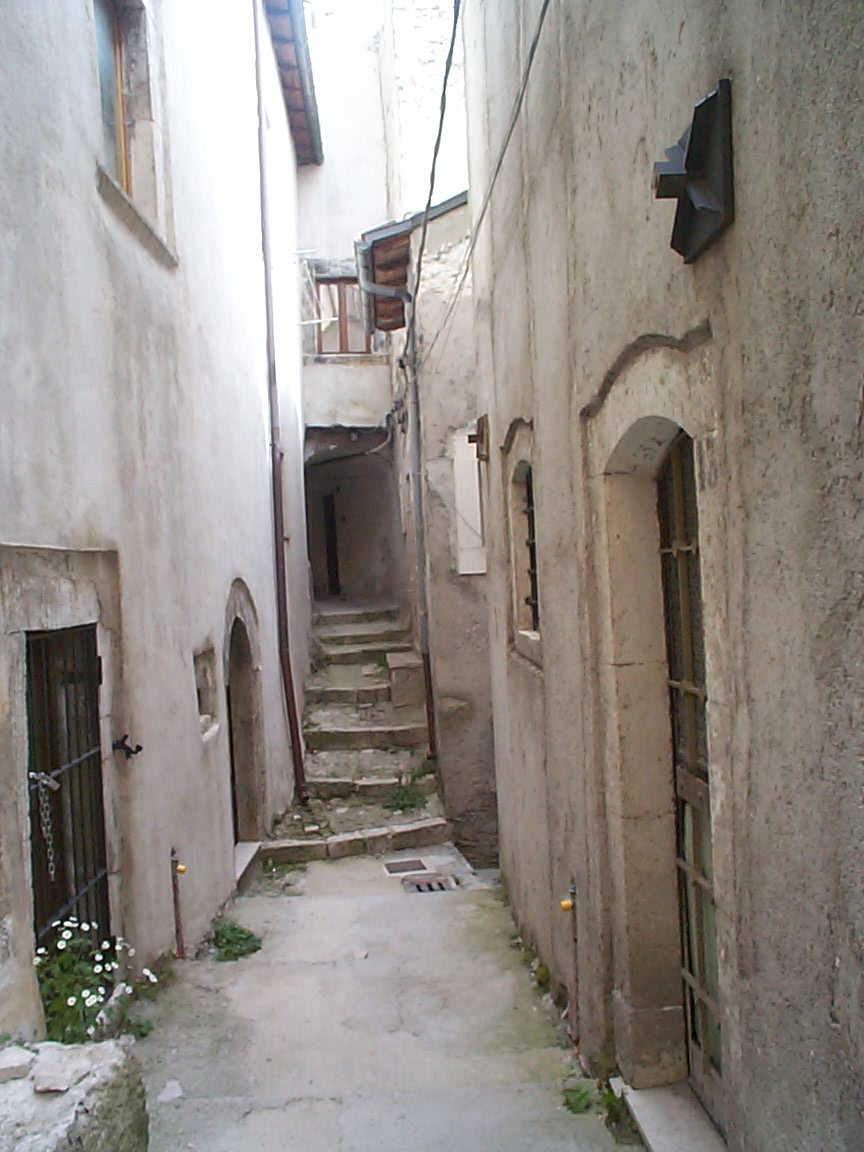
An alley in the village.

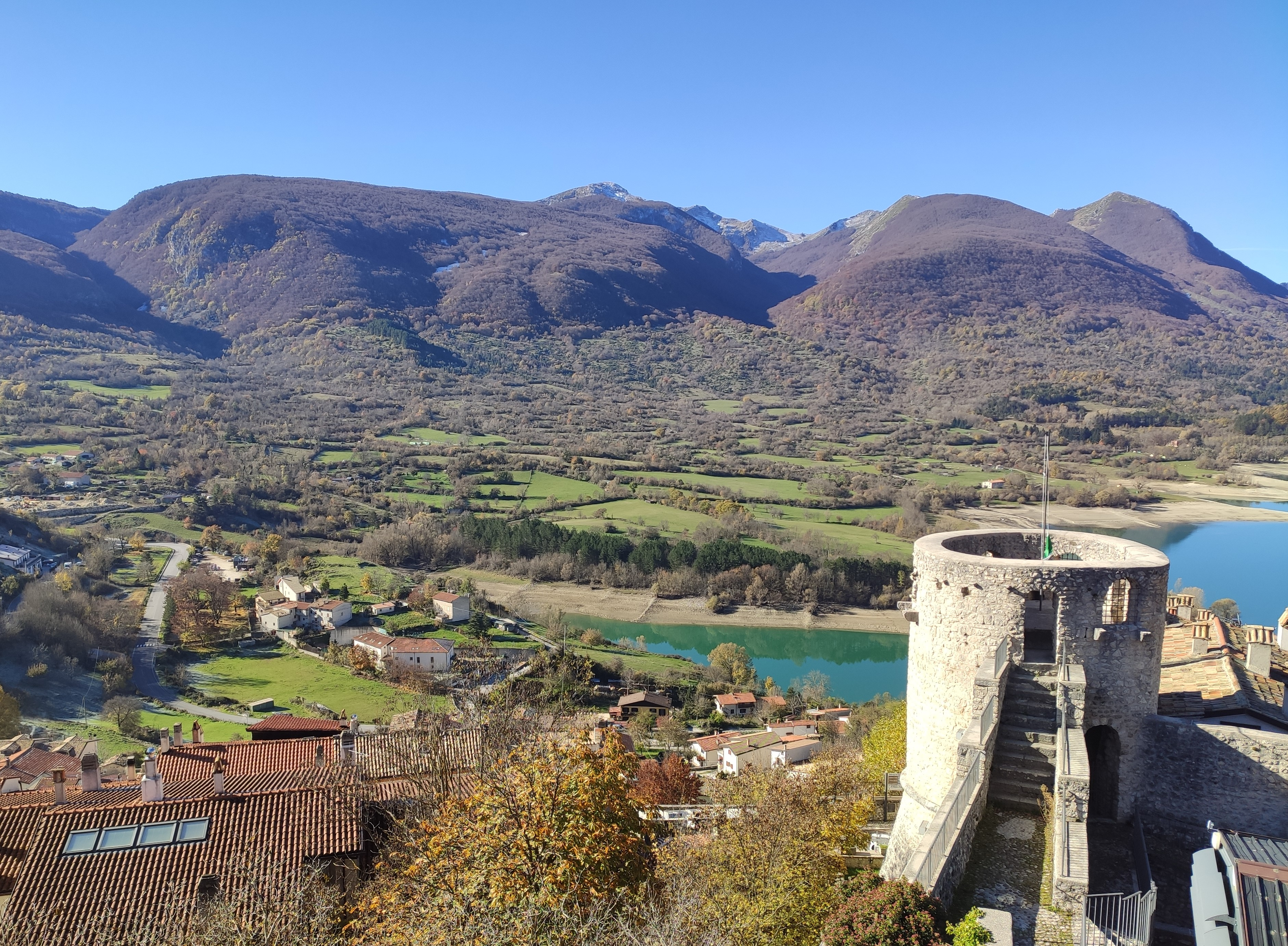
Glimpse of Barrea castle.
