= Lorenzo Arnone Sipari =

Italian nature writer and historian

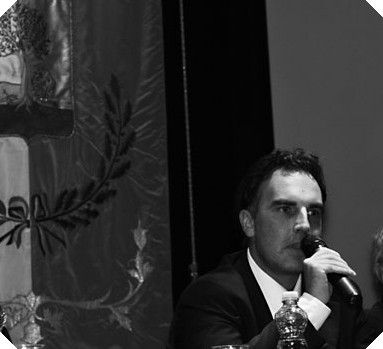
- Born: 10 October 1973; Rome, Italy
- Occupations: historian, writer and environmentalist

Lorenzo Arnone Sipari (born 10 October 1973) is an Italian nature writer and historian, author of many studies on the social and environmental history, especially on the origins and foundation of Parco Nazionale d'Abruzzo.

== Biography ==
He was born in Rome. He graduated at University of Cassino, with whom he published historical essays, particularly on the issues of the middle class of southern Italy between the 19th and 20th centuries and on the birth and development of the Rotary Club of Frosinone, Fiuggi and Cassino.

Since 1998 he conducts historical research on the nature conservation in Italy, publishing essays on the Parco Nazionale d'Abruzzo. On this issue, in 2011 he brought together in a volume the main articles, reports and letters of Erminio Sipari, member of the Parliament and also founder and first president of the first Italian Park. In 2007 he discovered that Giovanni Paolo Mattia Castrucci, a 17th-century historian of the duchy of Alvito author of the book "Descrittione del ducato di Alvito" (1633), reprinted several times, was a fictional character.

An important part of his research has been devoted to the life and work of Benedetto Croce, with particular reference to its background and to its historical methodology. He's the conservator of the Sipari family archive (in Alvito), which was declared of significant historical importance by Italian state.

== Main works ==
=== Social history ===
- Famiglia, patrimonio, potere locale: i Sipari in Terra di Lavoro nella seconda metà dell'Ottocento, in S. Casmirri (ed.), Le élites italiane prima e dopo l'unità: formazione e vita civile, Minturno 2000: 216-265.
- L'archivio e la biblioteca della Società operaia di mutuo soccorso di Sora, ed. by L. Alonzi, Soveria Mannelli 2001.
- Élite locale e infrastrutture: il caso della ferrovia Cassino-Atina-Sora, 1883-1914, in S. Casmirri (ed.), Lo stato in periferia: Élites, istituzioni e poteri locali nel Lazio meridionale tra Ottocento e Novecento, Università di Cassino 2003: 111-164.
- Spirito rotariano e impegno associativo nel Lazio meridionale: i Rotary Club di Frosinone, Cassino e Fiuggi, 1959-2005, Universita di Cassino 2005.
- Élites locali di Terra di Lavoro in età liberale: l'opera di Vincenzo Mazzenga, "Annale di storia regionale", 2006, nr. 1: 111-140.

=== Nature conservation ===
- Dalla riserva reale dell'Alta Val di Sangro alla costituzione del Parco Nazionale d'Abruzzo, "La lunga guerra per il Parco Nazionale d'Abruzzo, Lanciano 1998: 49-66.
- In difesa del nome Parco Nazionale d'Abruzzo, "Rivista Abruzzese", 2001, nr. 3: 251-253.
- Verso l'oro verde. La costruzione del turismo nel parco nazionale d'Abruzzo 1948-1973, "Adriatico", 2003, nr. 3: 39-47.
- "Il Parco nazionale d'Abruzzo liberato dall'allagamento": un conflitto tra tutela ambientale e sviluppo industriale durante il fascismo, "Rivista della Scuola Superiore dell'Economia e delle Finanze", 2004, nr. 8-9: 27-39 (online).
- Scritti scelti di Erminio Sipari sul Parco Nazionale d'Abruzzo (1922-1933), Trento 2011;
- The Notables of the Upper Val di Sangro and Their Role in the Genesis of the National Park, "Ninety Years of the Abruzzo National Park 1922-2012: Proceedings of the Conference held in Pescasseroli, May 18–20, 2012", Newcastle upon Tyne, Cambridge Scholars Publishing, 2013: 5-9 (online)

=== About Croce ===
- Benedetto Croce e la monografia di Pescasseroli dall'Archivio Sipari di Alvito, "Rivista Abruzese", 1998, nr. 4: 309-314.
- Croce tra noi, Due giornate di studio (Pescasseroli - Università di Cassino 3-4 giugno 2002), Atripalda 2003.
- Gli inediti di Benedetto Croce nell'Archivio Sipari di Alvito, "L'Acropoli", 2004, nr. 3: 309-319.
- Il brigantaggio meridionale nell'opera di Benedetto Croce tra le due guerre, in R. Colapietra (ed.), Benedetto Croce ed il Brigantaggio meridionale: un difficile rapporto, L'Aquila 2005: 73-85.
- La storia «civile» in rapporto alla conservazione della natura. Il dibattito Croce-Parpagliolo sulla legge per le bellezze naturali del 1922, "Diacritica", 2017, nr. 1: 15-35 (online).
