= Monti Marsicani =

Mountain range in Italy

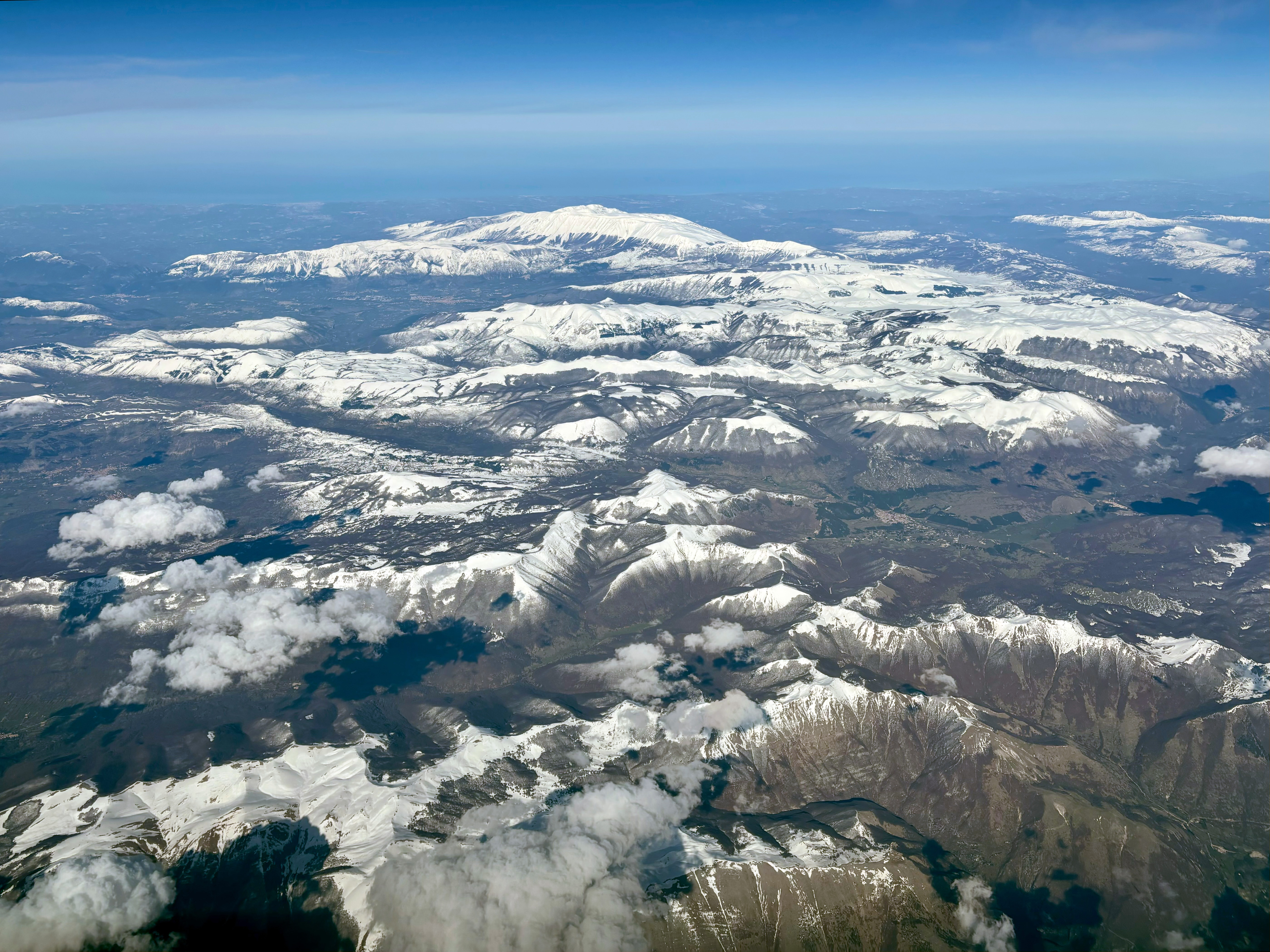
Maiella, Monti Marsicani summits with snow, Pescasseroli, Monte Palombo, Vallelonga and Serra Lunga

The Monti Marsicani (or 'Marsicano',) are the sixth-highest group of Apennines located in the Abruzzo region, mostly in the Province of L’Aquila and partly in the Province of Frosinone and Province of Isernia. The highest peak is Monte Greco (2285m). They are limited in north by the Fucino plateau and Peligna Valley, on the east by the River Gizio and Altopiano delle Cinque Miglia, on the south by the Valley Sangro and Volturno, on the east by valley Liri and Melfa.

The main feature of this area is the rugged landscape characterized by a wild and well-preserved natural environment with dense forests composed mainly of beech and with the presence of many endangered species. Their survival was possible mainly thanks to the National Park of Abruzzo, Lazio and Molise that protects a huge part of this mountain group.

== Orography ==
The Marsicani Mountains can be divided into numerous subgroups that are each greater than the height of 2000 metres and are separated by valleys in which there are rivers and streams leading into the Tyrrhenian and Adriatic Seas and the riverbed of Fucino. The most important lakes are the Barrea and the Montagna Spaccata, that are artificial and the Scanno (natural). The lake at Villalago, the Lake of the Castel San Vincenzo, the Vivo and finally the Pantaniello are the minor natural lakes in this area. All protected parts are crossed by the river Sangro, that has its origins in this area.

The subgroups that compose the Marsicani Mountains :

- Monti di Roccaraso (Monte Arazzecca 1830 m)
- Monte Genzana e Monte Greco (Monte Greco 2285 m, Serra Rocca Chiarano 2262 m, Monte Genzana 2170 m)
- Montagna di Godi (Monte Godi 2011 m)
- La Camosciara (Monte Capraro 2100 m)
- Monti della Meta (Monte Petroso 2249 m)
- Le Mainarde (Coste dell’Altare 2075 m)
- Montagna Grande e Monte Marsicano (Monte Marsicano 2253 m, La Terratta 2200 m)
- Monte Palombo (Monte Palombo 2013 m)
- Monte Turchio (Rocca Genovese 1944 m)
- Monte di Valle Caprara e Monte Ceraso (Monte di Valle Caprara 1998 m)
- Monte La Rocca e Serra Traversa (Monte La Rocca 1924 m)
- Monte Panico e Serra delle Gravare (Rocca Altiera 2018 m)
- Monte Cornacchia (Monte Cornacchia 2003 m)

The area is made of 21 municipal communities from which lead various paths, part of the organized structure for tourists, that include visitor centers, museums, refuges and many other attractions. The most popular trails are those that lead to the Camosciara Fondillo, the Cicerana and Mount Marsicano.

== Geology ==
The origin of this Mountains reach the Mesozoic era and the Tertiary, which is about 170 – 30 million years ago. Limestone was created in marine territories, by lagoons and cliffs with important impact of algae, corals, mollusks, gastropods. The most important characteristics of that period are various types of sedimentation, such as a platform that origins from a marine zone with little oxygen and much algae, calcareous substances and creatures adapted to survive in muddy territories. Further east other types of territories were formed. The area was far more nutritive, which permitted the existence of numerous living forms and their fossils now are an important source for geological researches. The diversity of landscape in the past result in the creation of different forms such as glaciers, caves, valleys, ravines.

== Flora and fauna ==
Iris marsica

Monti Marsicani has one of the best preserved fauna and flora in Europe. The flora has mainly Mediterranean and mountainous features. In general, in the forest on the height of 1000 – 1100 meters dominates the broad-leaved three. Up to 1700–1800 meters dominates the beech. Other important trees are black pine with some subspecies such as "Pino nero di Villetta Barrea" and mountain pine. A notable tree is silver birch, that is rather typical for northern Europe, since in southern Europe can grow only in high altitudes. A complete list of the flora reaches about 2,000 species. Among typical flowers can be found the lily, violet, cyclamen, primrose, orchid and rare flowers such as Cypripedium calceolus and Iris marsica (which is only found in the Abruzzo region).

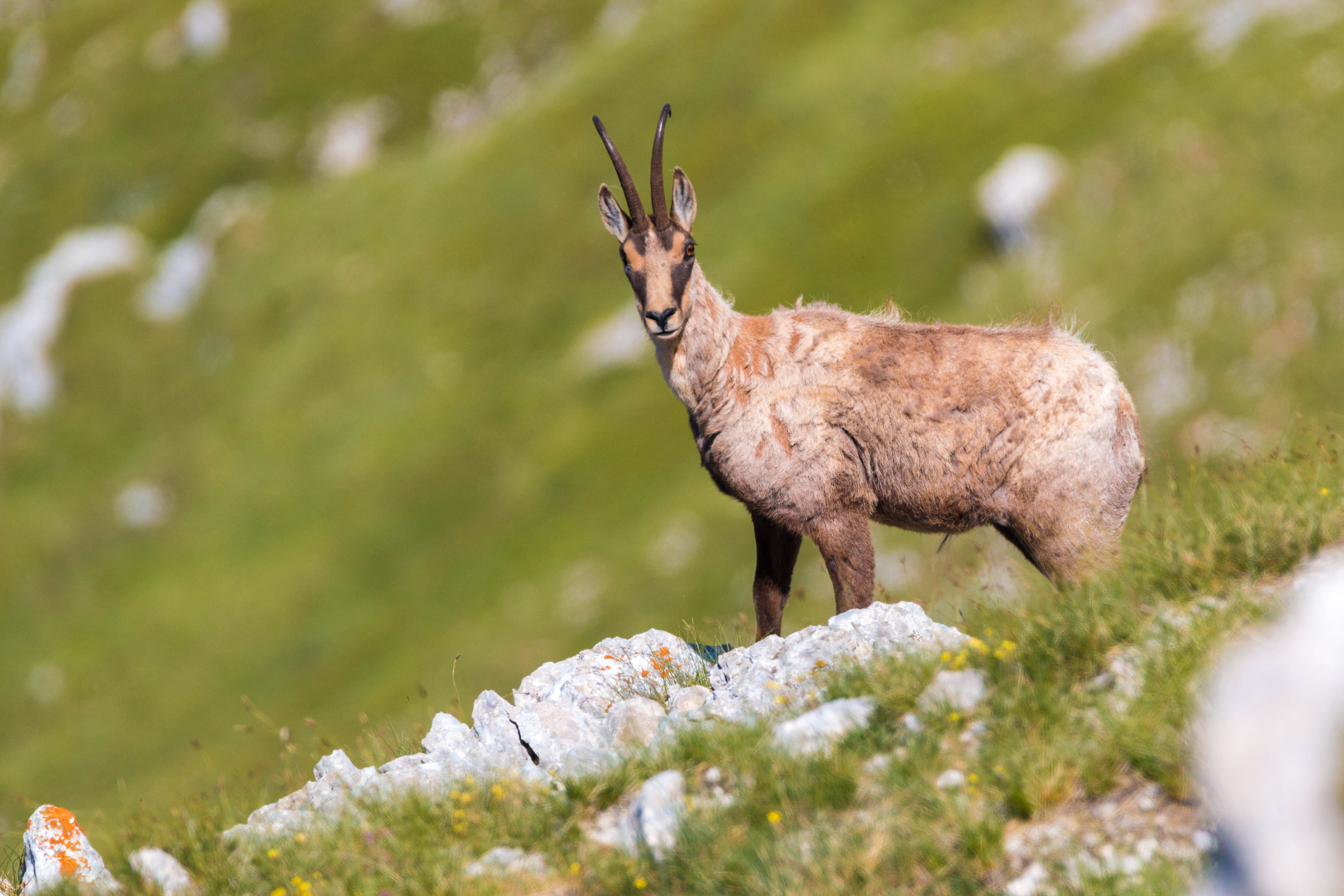
Abruzzo chamois

There are about 60 species of mammals, 300 of birds, 40 of reptiles, amphibians and fish and they all are protected as a part of National Park of Abruzzo, Lazio and Molise. As it comes to the fauna, the most notable species are Marsican brown bear, Italian wolf, Abruzzo chamois (Rupicapra pyrenaica ornata), red deer and roe deer. The number of bear population is recently declining, from about 100 it has fallen to about 30 in recent years, while the population of wolves is permanently increasing. Among the reclusive species there are the eurasian lynx, the wild boar, the polecat, the badger, the otter, the pine marten and the beech marten.
Among the animals frequently seen there are some species such as the red fox, the red squirrel or dormouse. Other notable species are the western European hedgehog, the European mole, the wildcat, the mountain hare and the crested porcupine.

== Bibliography ==
- Landi Vittori C. (1955). Guida dei Monti d'Italia: Appennino Centrale. Volume I. Club Alpino Italiano, Milano. II edizione 1989 a cura di Rodolfo Landi Vittori.
- Damiani A.V. (1989). Geologia dell’Appennino Centrale. In Carlo Landi Vittorj (1989) “Guida dei Monti d'Italia: Appennino Centrale. Volume I. II Edizione a cura di Rodolfo Landi Vittorj ” Club Alpino Italiano, Milano.
- Pignatti S. (1982). Flora d’Italia. Edagricole, Bologna.
- Ferioli E. (1989). Atlante degli alberi d'Italia. Giorgio Mondadori Editore, Milano.
