= Distribution of brown bears =

Brown bear range map

Brown bears (Ursus arctos) were once native to Europe, much of Asia, the Atlas Mountains of Africa, and North America, but are now extirpated in some areas, and their populations have greatly decreased in other areas. There are approximately 200,000 brown bears left in the world. The largest population is in Russia, with 120,000 individuals. The brown bear occupies the largest range of habitats of any Ursus species with recorded observations in every temperate northern forest and at elevations as high as 5,000 m.

== Europe ==
In Europe, there are 18,000 brown bears in ten fragmented populations, from Spain (estimated at only 20–25 animals in the Pyrenees in 2010, in a range shared between Spain, France and Andorra, and some 210 animals in Asturias, Cantabria, Galicia and León, in the Picos de Europa and adjacent areas in 2013) in the west, to Russia in the east, and from Sweden and Finland in the north to Romania (~13000), Bulgaria (900–1200), Slovakia (with about 2500–3000 animals), Slovenia (1100 animals) and Greece (with >500 animals) in the north of the country. They are extinct in the British Isles (at least 1,500 years ago, possibly even 3,000 years ago), Denmark (about 6,500 years ago), the Netherlands (about 1,000 years ago, although later singles rarely wandered from Germany), Belgium, Luxembourg, Germany (in the year 1835, although singles wandering from Italy were recorded in 2006 and 2019), Switzerland (in 1904, although a single was seen in 1923 and since 2005 there has been an increasing number of sightings of wanderers from Italy), and Portugal (in 1843, although a wanderer from Spain was recorded in 2019), endangered in France, and threatened in Spain and most of Central Europe. The Carpathian brown bear population of Romania is the largest in Europe outside Russia, estimated at 12000 to 14,000 bears, and climbing due to strict legislation which is causing problems for mountain tourism. There is also a smaller brown bear population in the Carpathian Mountains in Ukraine (estimated at 200 in 2005), Slovakia (estimated at 2500 - 3000 in 2020) and Poland (estimated at 100 in 2009 in the latter country). The total Carpathian population is estimated at 8,000. Northern Europe is home to a large bear population, with an estimated 2,500 (range 2,350–2,900) in Sweden, about 1,600 in Finland, about 1,100 in Estonia and 70 in Norway. Another large and relatively stable population of brown bears in Europe, consisting of 2,500–3,000 individuals, is the Dinaric-Pindos (Balkans) population, with contiguous distribution in northeast Italy, Slovenia, Croatia, Bosnia and Herzegovina, Serbia, Montenegro, North Macedonia, Albania, Bulgaria and Greece.

The population of brown bears in the Pyrenees mountain range between Spain and France is extremely low, estimated at 14 to 18, with a shortage of females. Their rarity in this area has led biologists to release bears, mostly female, from Slovenia in spring 2006 to reduce the imbalance and preserve the species' presence in the area. The bears were released despite protests from French farmers. A small population of brown bears (Ursus arctos marsicanus) still lives in central Italy (the Apennine Mountains, Abruzzo and Latium), with no more than 50–60 individuals, protected by strong laws, but endangered by the human presence in the area. In 2020, a film crew working in Natural Park O Invernadeiro in Ourense, Galicia recorded the first brown bear in northwestern Spain in 150 years.

== Asia ==
In Asia, brown bears are found primarily throughout Russia, thence more spottily southwest to parts of Turkey, to as far south as southwestern Iran, and to the southeast in a small area of Northeast China, Western China, and parts of North Korea, Pakistan, Afghanistan and India. It is determined that the number of brown bears in Turkey comes up to 5,432, and they have an average density of 194 bears/1,000 km^{2}. They can also be found on the Japanese island of Hokkaidō, which holds the largest number of non-Russian brown bears in eastern Asia with about 2,000–3,000 animals.

== North America ==
Kodiak bears live in Alaska, east through the Yukon and Northwest Territories, south through British Columbia and through the western half of Alberta. The Alaskan population is estimated at a healthy 32,000 individuals. Small populations of grizzly bears exist in the Greater Yellowstone Ecosystem of northwest Wyoming (with about 600 animals), the Northern Continental Divide Ecosystem of northwest Montana (with about 750 animals), the Cabinet-Yaak Ecosystem of northwest Montana and northeast Idaho (with about 30–40 animals), the Selkirk Ecosystem of northeast Washington and northwest Idaho (with about 40–50 animals), and the North Cascades Ecosystem of northcentral Washington (with about 5–10 animals). These five ecosystems combine for a total of approximately 1,400-1,700 wild grizzlies still persisting in the contiguous United States. These populations are isolated from each other, inhibiting any genetic flow between ecosystems. This poses one of the greatest threats to the future survival of the grizzly bear in the contiguous United States. Conservation efforts to increase this number begin with reducing human-bear interactions and creating protected wildlife spaces. Attempts at reintroduction have been made by wildlife advocates, but ultimately rejected by the US Fish and Wildlife Service. The last California grizzly bear sighting was in 1924 and no specimens have been seen since.

A small brown bear population once lived in the northern parts of Mexico, New Mexico, and Arizona. This population is now extinct as the last known Mexican grizzly bear was shot in 1976. These bears were smaller and lighter than the Canadian and United States brown bear population. Because of their lighter coloring, they were often referred to as “el oso plateado” (the silver bear).
