= Abruzzo, Lazio and Molise National Park =

Italian national park

Coordinates: 41°45′51″N 13°52′08″E

- Parco Nazionale d'Abruzzo, Lazio e Molise
- IUCN category II (national park)
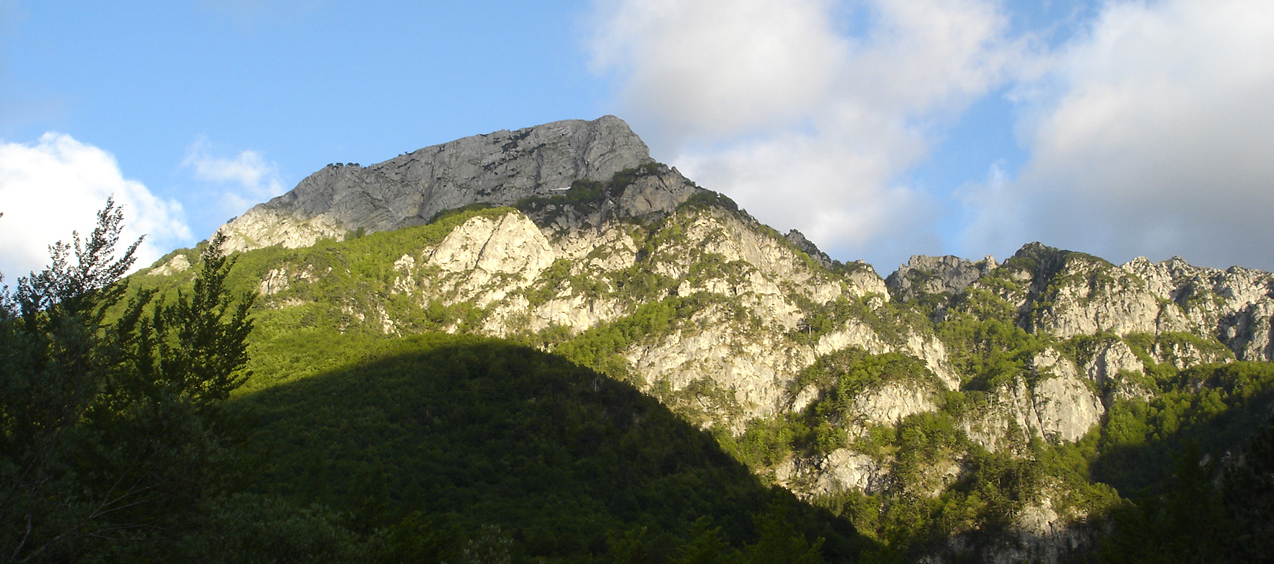
- Monte Sterpi d'Alto

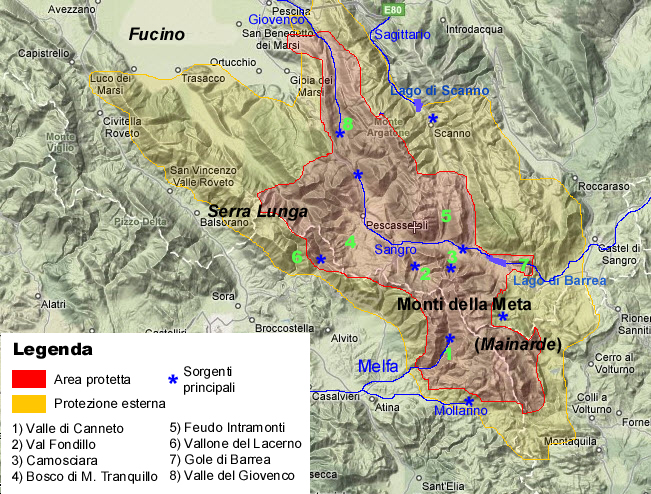
- Location: Abruzzo, Lazio, Molise
- Nearest city: Rome
- Area: 496.80 km^{2} (191.82 sq mi)
- Established: 1923
- Governing body: Ministero dell'Ambiente
- Website: www.parks.it/parco.nazionale.abruzzo/Eindex.html

Abruzzo, Lazio and Molise National Park (Italian: Parco Nazionale d'Abruzzo, Lazio e Molise) is an Italian national park established in 1923. The majority of the park is located in the Abruzzo region, with smaller parts in Lazio and Molise. It is sometimes called by its former name Abruzzo National Park. The park headquarters are in Pescasseroli in the Province of L'Aquila. The park's area is 496.80 km^{2} (191.82 sq mi).

It is the oldest park in the Apennine Mountains, and the second oldest in Italy, with an important role in the preservation of species such as the Italian wolf, Abruzzo chamois and Marsican brown bear. Other characteristic fauna of the park are red deer and roe deer, wild boar and the white-backed woodpecker. The protected area is around two thirds beech forest, though many other tree species grow in the area, including silver birch and black and mountain pines.

== History ==
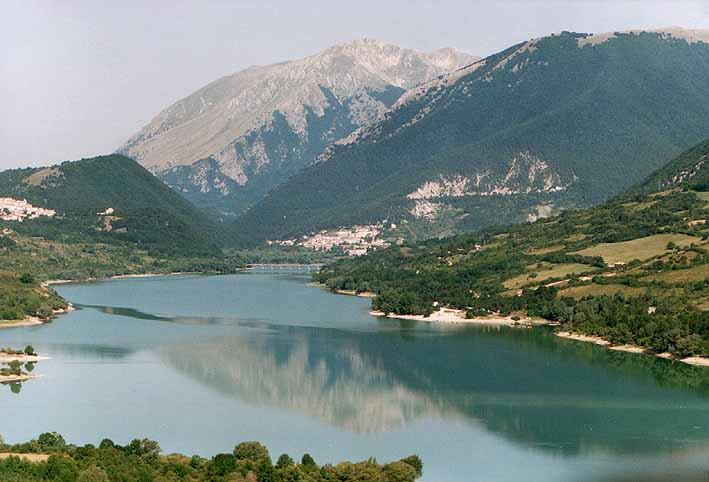
Lake Barrea and Mount Marsicano.

The idea for the Abruzzo National Park arose in the years following World War I thanks to the work of Erminio Sipari, environmentalist, member of Italian Parliament and cousin of Benedetto Croce. Between the months of October and November 1921, the municipality of Opi leased 5 square kilometres of land to a private federation with the aim of protecting flora and fauna and Sipari founded in Rome an organization to administer the reserve. So the Park was founded in September 1922. Over the next few years the territory of the park expanded into neighbouring municipalities until it covered around 120 km^{2} by 1923, when protection was enshrined in law. A period of intense activity followed and the park had further expanded to around 300 km^{2} when it was abolished by the Fascist government in 1933.

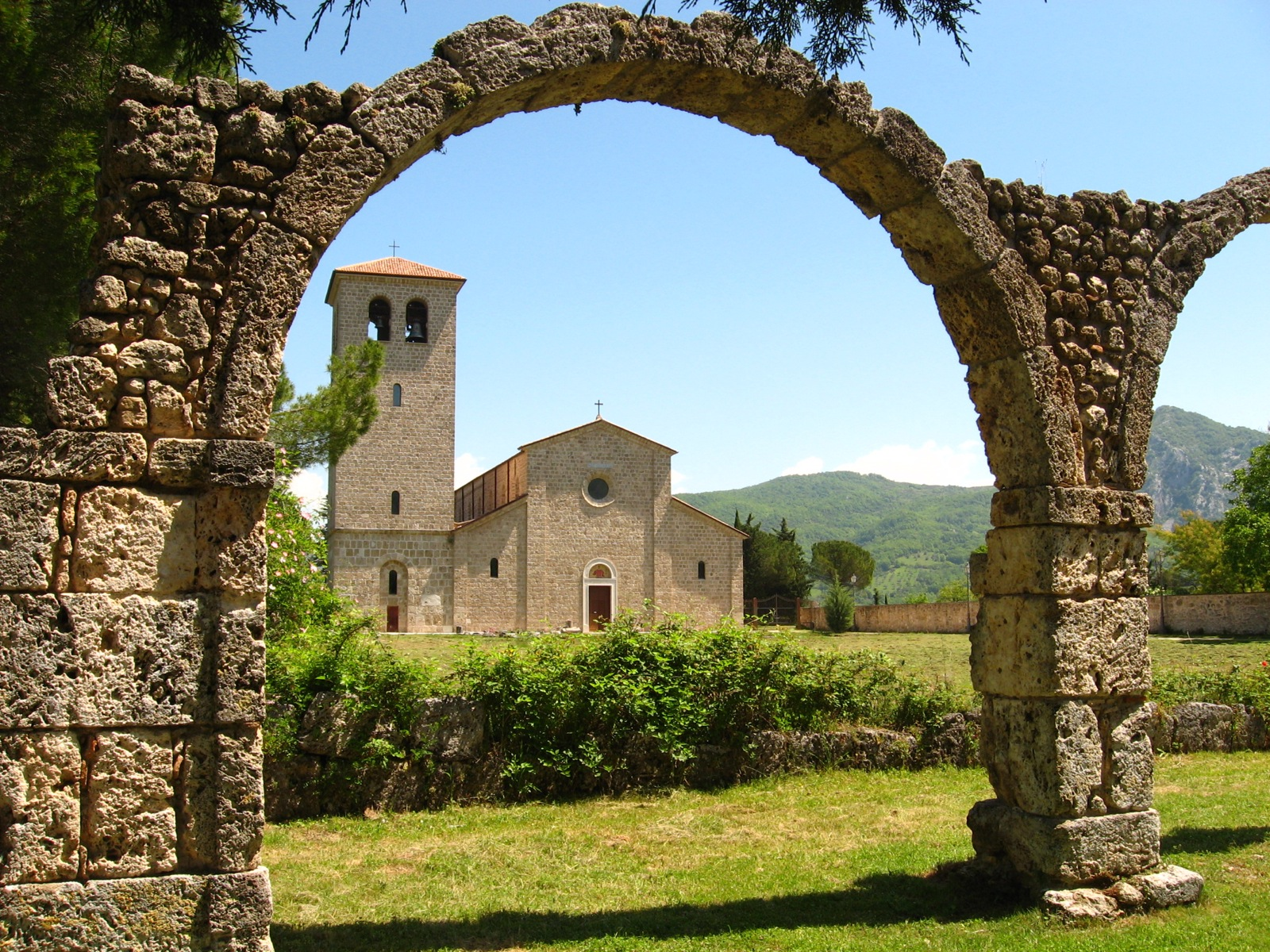
The monastery of San Vincenzo al Volturno

Re-establishment of the park in 1950 coincided with a period of financial difficulty, followed by a building boom which saw more than 12,000 trees felled for the construction of houses, roads and ski tracks. A reorganization of the park management at the end of the 1960s heralded better times and by 1976, further expansion to 400 km^{2}, followed at the request of villages in neighbouring Molise, that were convinced by the economic benefits of the park. Today, at 500 km^{2}, the area of the park is 100 times larger than the original reserve. However, the park's role in the marsican bear conservation program is now strongly debated; while every year there are monitoring actions of the total bear's population there have been recently some problems related to the pave actions carried out inside the park's boundaries and the building projects to connect the only ski track of the park to the opposite valley, which is a delicate spot for the bear's movements.

== Geography ==
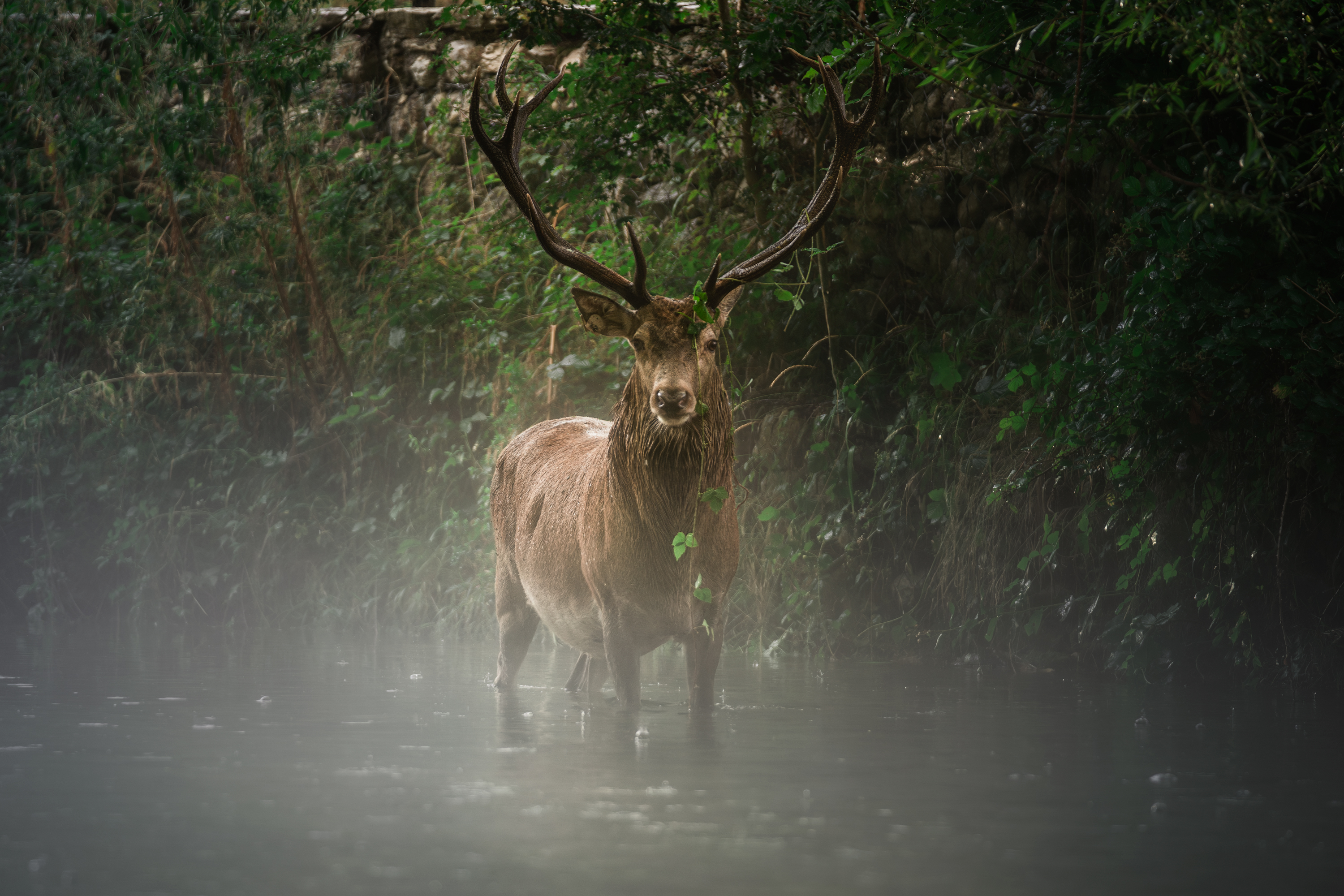
A Cervus elaphus in the Sangro

The mountains within the park are Petroso (2,249 metres), Marsicano (2,245 metres), Meta (2,242 metres), Tartaro (2,191 metres), Jamiccio (2,074 metres), Cavallo (2,039 metres), Palombo (2,013 metres). These are included in the Monti della Meta. The Sangro River rises near Pescasseroli and runs south-east through the artificial Lago di Barrea before leaving the park and turning to the north-east. Other rivers in the park are the Giovenco, Malfa and Volturno. Other lakes are Vivo, Pantaniello, Scanno, Montagna Spaccata, Castel San Vincenzo, Grottacampanaro, and Selva di Cardito.

== Fauna ==
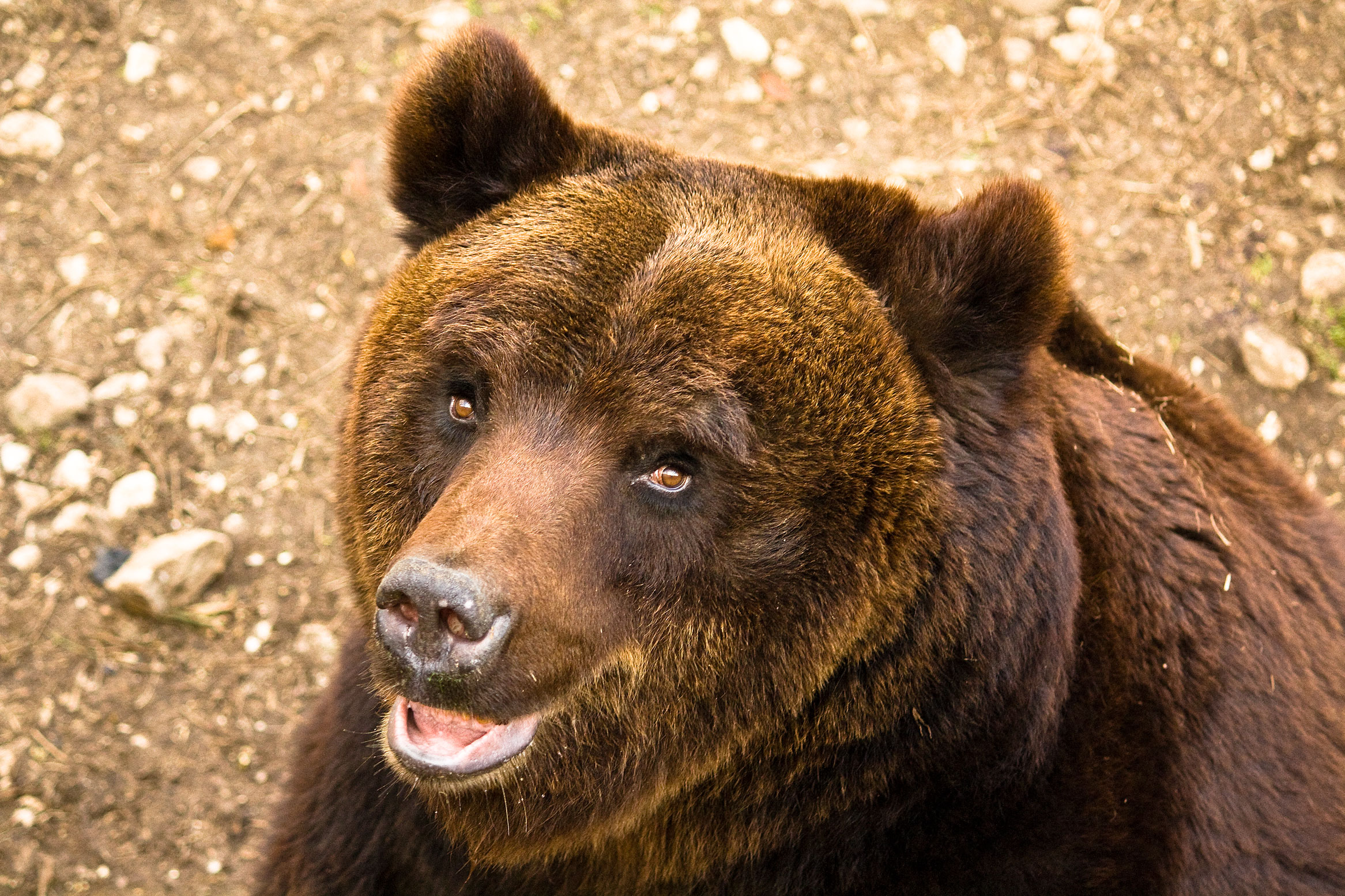
Marsican brown bear

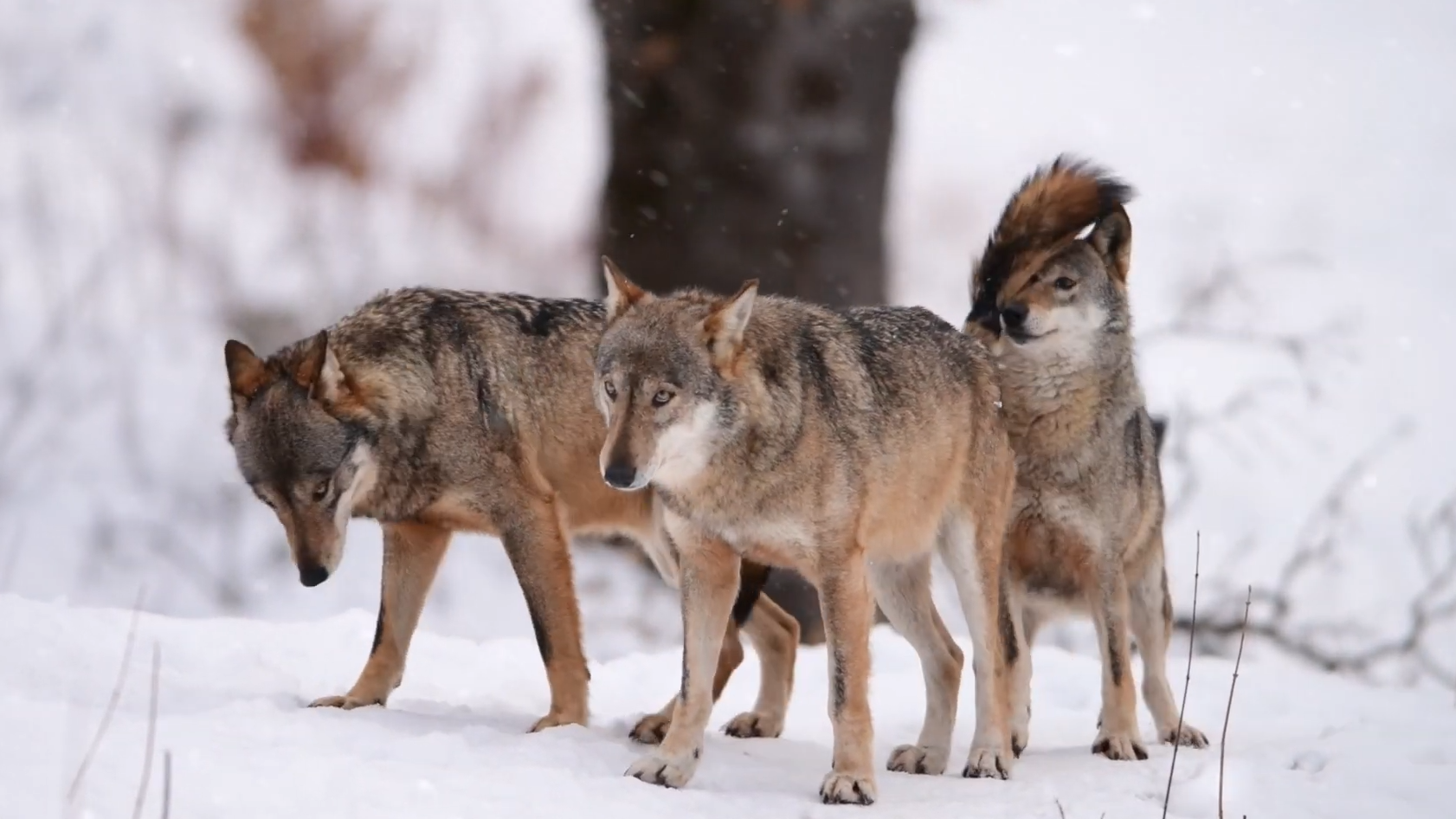
Italian wolf pack

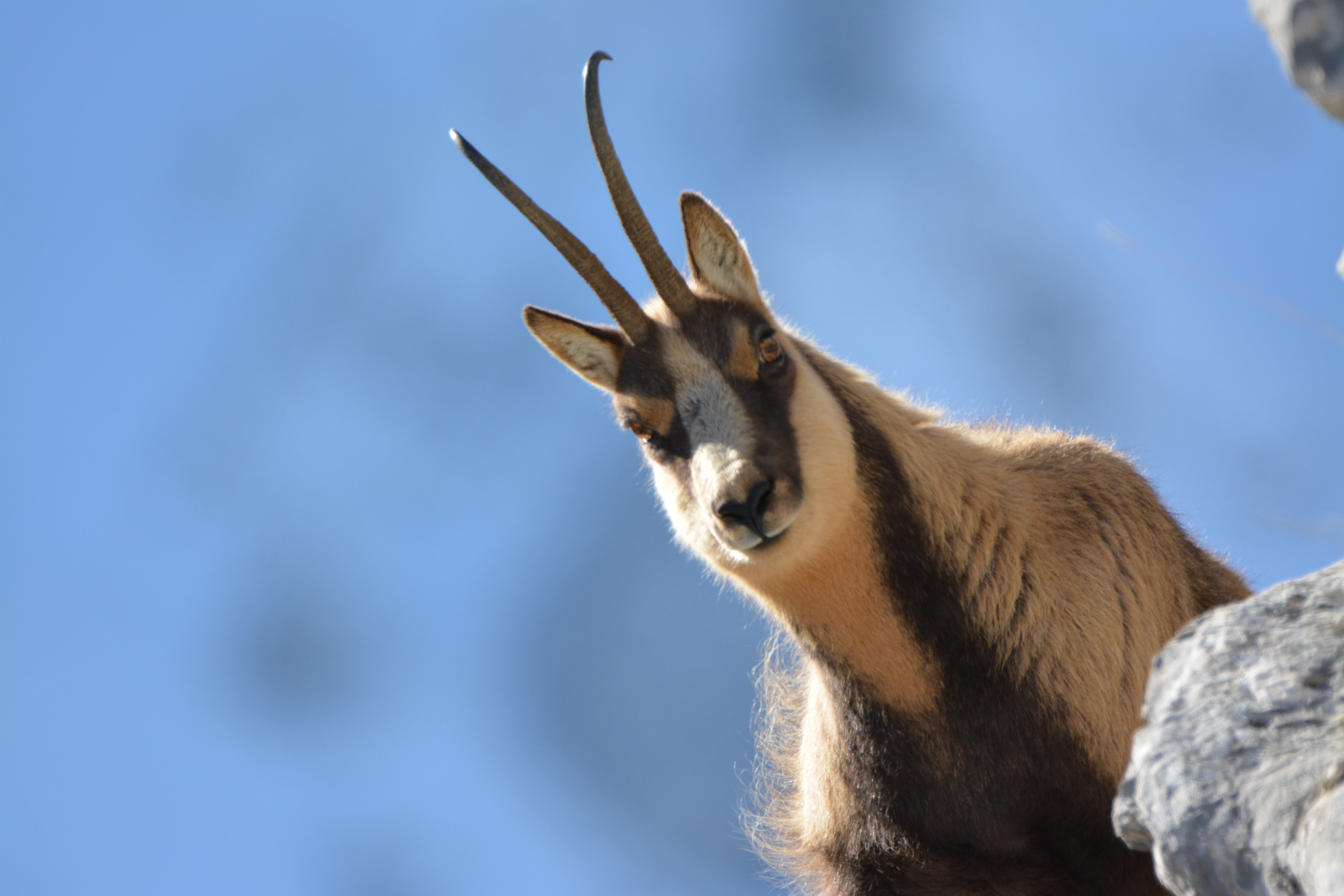
Abruzzo chamois

In wildlife terms, the main attractions of the park are the Marsican brown bear and Italian wolf.

While official figures report 50-70 bears in this genetically isolated population, the declining population was estimated in 2006 at closer to 30. The shift from local agriculture to development in Abruzzo (including a controversial proposed ski resort) and poaching, threaten this remaining small population.

While Wolves were once rarer (as low as 40), numbers had reportedly rebounded in 2007. In April 2026, a number of wolves were found dead, apparently poisoned.

The presence of the Eurasian lynx in the park is still controversial, and there are no scientific studies that prove it; however, there are some unconfirmed sightings.

In greater numbers, in the thicker areas of the forest, are red deer and roe deer, reintroduced in the seventies, and the wild boar. Other reclusive inhabitants of the forest include European polecat, Eurasian badger, Eurasian otter and two species of marten; pine marten and beech marten. Higher, above the forest, Abruzzo chamois (Rupicapra pyrenaica ornata) live alone or in small groups.

Animals that are easier to see include red fox, the European hare, the least weasel, the European mole, and the western European hedgehog. Dormice and red squirrel s are also quite frequently seen. Other mammals recorded in the park are the snow vole, the edible dormouse, the European wildcat and the Garden dormouse.

== Birds ==
Many birds of prey inhabit the park. Most notable amongst them is the golden eagle, represented by six breeding couples, which, despite living in the more inaccessible regions, can often be seen soaring over central areas of the park in search of prey such as small mammals or even sick, young chamois. Other raptors that reside within the park include goshawks, peregrine falcons, Eurasian buzzards, Eurasian kestrels and Eurasian sparrowhawks. Less visible, but perhaps more audible, to the nighttime visitor are several species of owl, the little owl, the barn owl and the tawny owl. Woodland birds include the European green woodpecker and the rare white-backed woodpecker, cliffs harbor the red-billed chough and alpine chough and bare mountain birds include the rock partridge and white-winged snowfinch. Streams provide habitat for the grey wagtail and white-throated dipper.

== Plants ==
The flora of the park is rich and interesting. A comprehensive list of plants would extend to more than 2,000 species without including lichens, algae or fungi. Flowers present in the area include Marsican Iris (Iris marsica), gentian, primrose, cyclamen, violets and the lily. The most well-known flower of the park is the rare lady's slipper (Cypripedium calceolus), a yellow and black orchid.

The predominant tree of the park is the beech which covers 60% of the area, generally grows at 900–1800 m altitude and provides a stunning display of color throughout the whole year. Notable also the presence of some old-growth beech forests in the northern part of the park. Other trees are the black pine, the mountain pine and the silver birch.

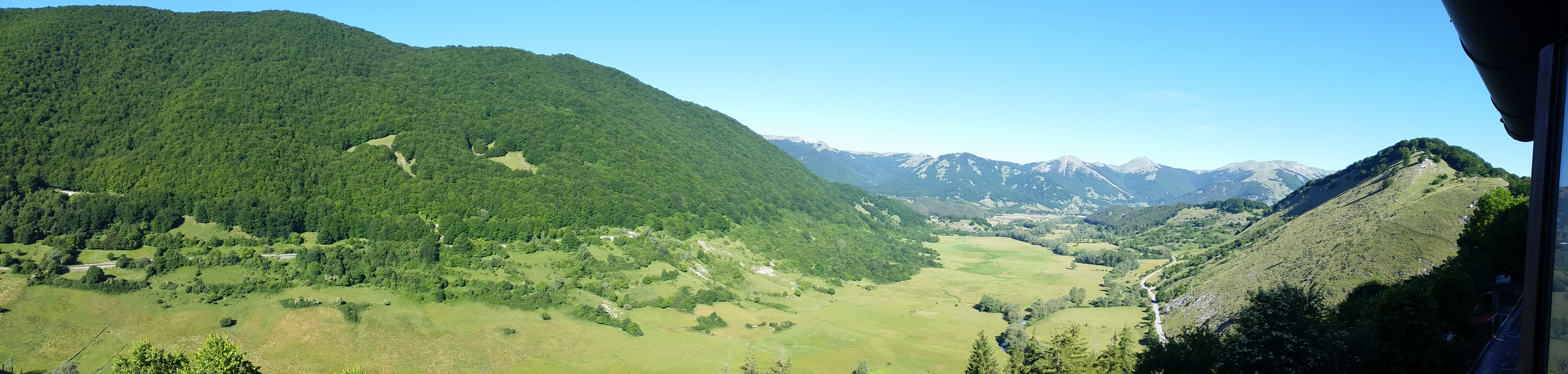
Panorama of Opi

== Municipalities ==
The park covers 25 municipalities, distributed across 3 provinces.

Province of L'Aquila:

- Alfedena, Barrea, Bisegna, Civitella Alfedena, Gioia dei Marsi, Lecce nei Marsi, Opi, Ortona dei Marsi, Pescasseroli, Scanno, Villavallelonga, Villetta Barrea

Province of Frosinone:

- Alvito, Campoli Appennino, Pescosolido, Picinisco, San Biagio Saracinisco, San Donato Val di Comino, Settefrati, Vallerotonda

Provincia of Isernia:

- Castel San Vincenzo, Filignano, Pizzone, Rocchetta a Volturno, Scapoli

== Activities ==
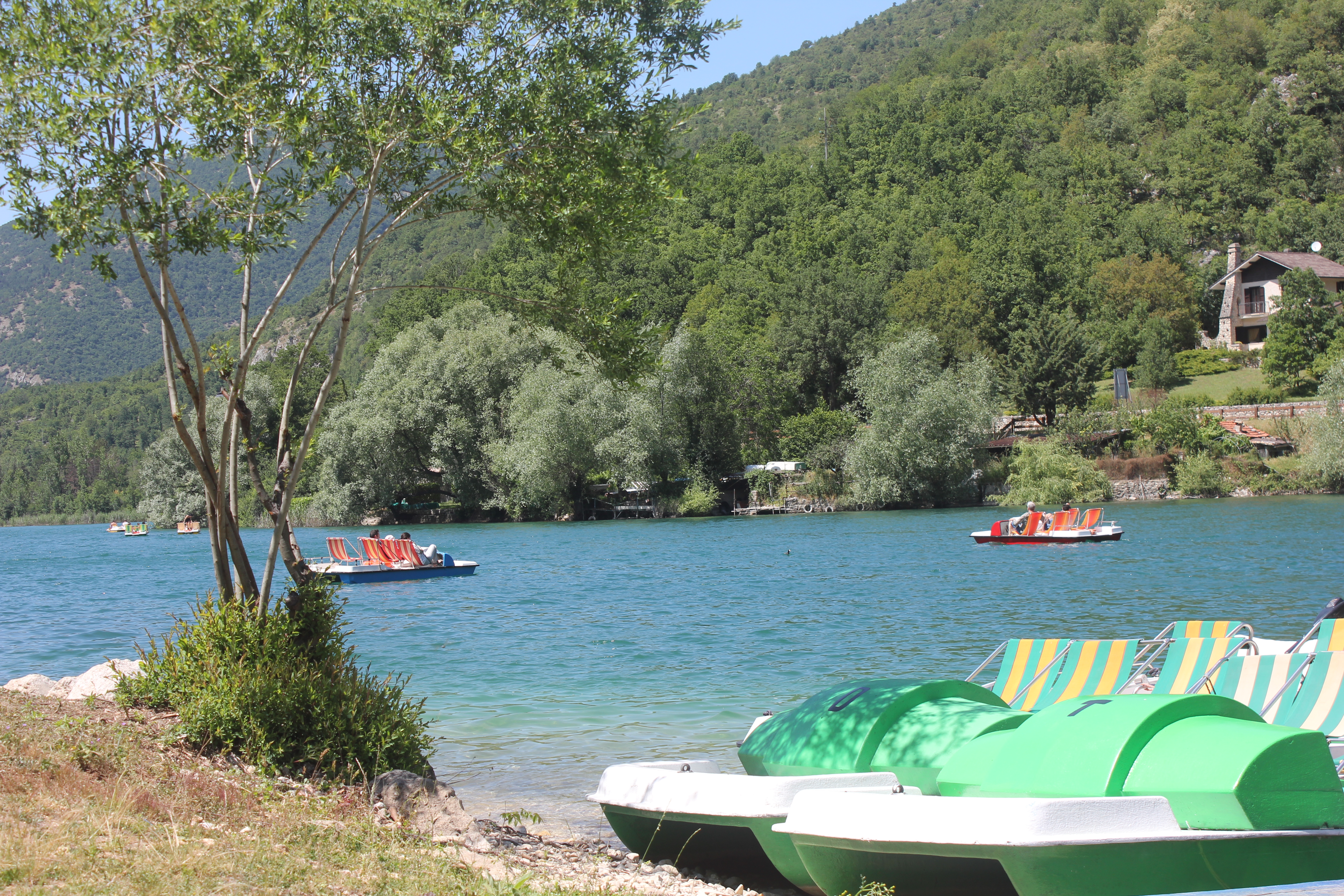
Lake Scanno

Many outdoor activities are possible within the park including,

- Horse riding
- Trekking
- Cycling
- Canoeing
- Bird watching
- Alpine skiing
- Cross-country skiing

== See also ==
- Monti della Meta
- List of highest paved roads in Europe
- List of mountain passes
