= Achille Graziani =

Italian archaeologist

Achille Graziani (Villetta Barrea, 4 May 1839 – Alvito, 23 October 1918) was an Italian archaeologist.

== Life ==
Graziani was a member of a rich family with land possessions in the Marsican Abruzzo, in Terra di Lavoro and in Capitanata.

Following the ideals of the Italian Risorgimento, in 1860, Graziani participated in the expedition of the Thousand, fighting in Milazzo and in the Battle of Volturnus.

An attentive scholar, he carried out excavation in the Grotta dei Banditi (later renamed Grotta Graziani), where he discovered important lithic objects. In his palace of Alvito he collected many archaeological findings, including important Oscan inscriptions, partly studied by Mommsen and recorded in the Corpus Inscriptionum Latinarum.

== Sources ==
- L. Arnone Sipari, Famiglia, patrimonio, potere locale: i Sipari in Terra di Lavoro nella seconda metà dell'800, in S. Casmirri, Le élites italiane prima e dopo l'Unità:, Marina di Minturno, Caramanica, 2000, pp. 221–222.
- M. Rizzello, Il Museo Achille Graziani di Alvito. Gli importanti riferimenti al luogo di culto e alle zone funerarie della Val di Comino, «Terra dei Volsci. Miscellanea 2», 1996, pp. 5–22.
- R. Antonini, I documenti sannitici del Museo Graziani ad Alvito (FR). Ovvero la tradizione del miraggio (1854-1974), «Terra dei Volsci. Miscellanea 2», 1996, pp. 23–37.
