= Lake Barrea =

Lake in Abruzzo, Italy

Lago di Barrea
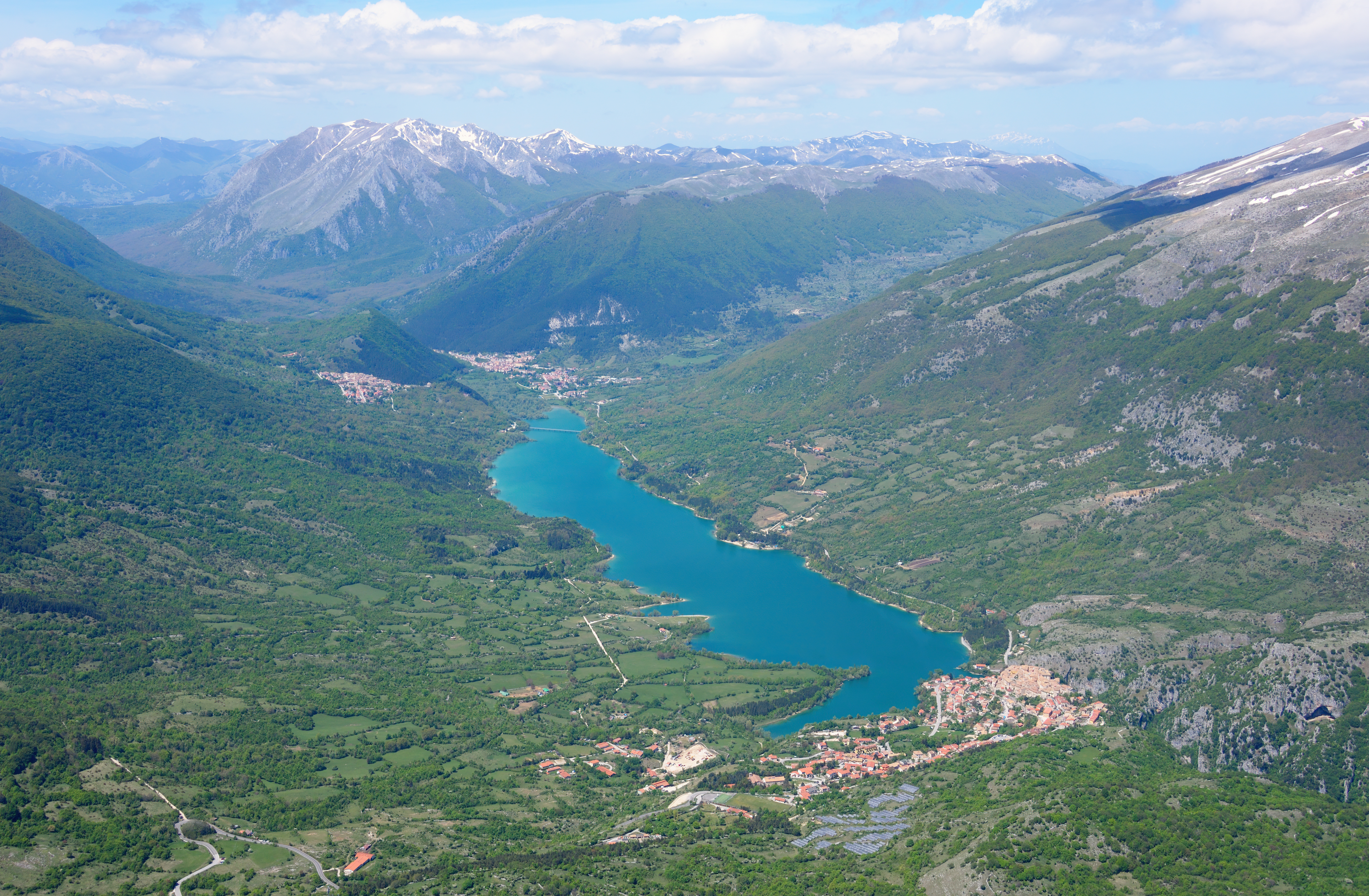
- Aerial view of Lake Barrea

- Location within Italy
- Location: Province of L'Aquila, Abruzzo
- Coordinates: 41.763°N 13.969°E
- Primary inflows: Sangro
- Primary outflows: Sangro
- Basin countries: Italy
- Surface area: 2.25 square kilometres (0.87 sq mi)
- Max. depth: 31 metres (102 ft)
- Water volume: 0.0243 cubic kilometres (0.0058 cu mi)

Ramsar Wetland
- Official name: Lago di Barrea
- Designated: 14 December 1976
- Reference no.: 131

Lake Barrea, is an artificial lake in the Province of L'Aquila, Abruzzo, Italy. It is located within the National Park of Abruzzo, Lazio and Molise. The Sangro is its inflow and outflow. To its northwest is Villetta Barrea and to its southeast is Alfedena. To its north is Monte Greco.

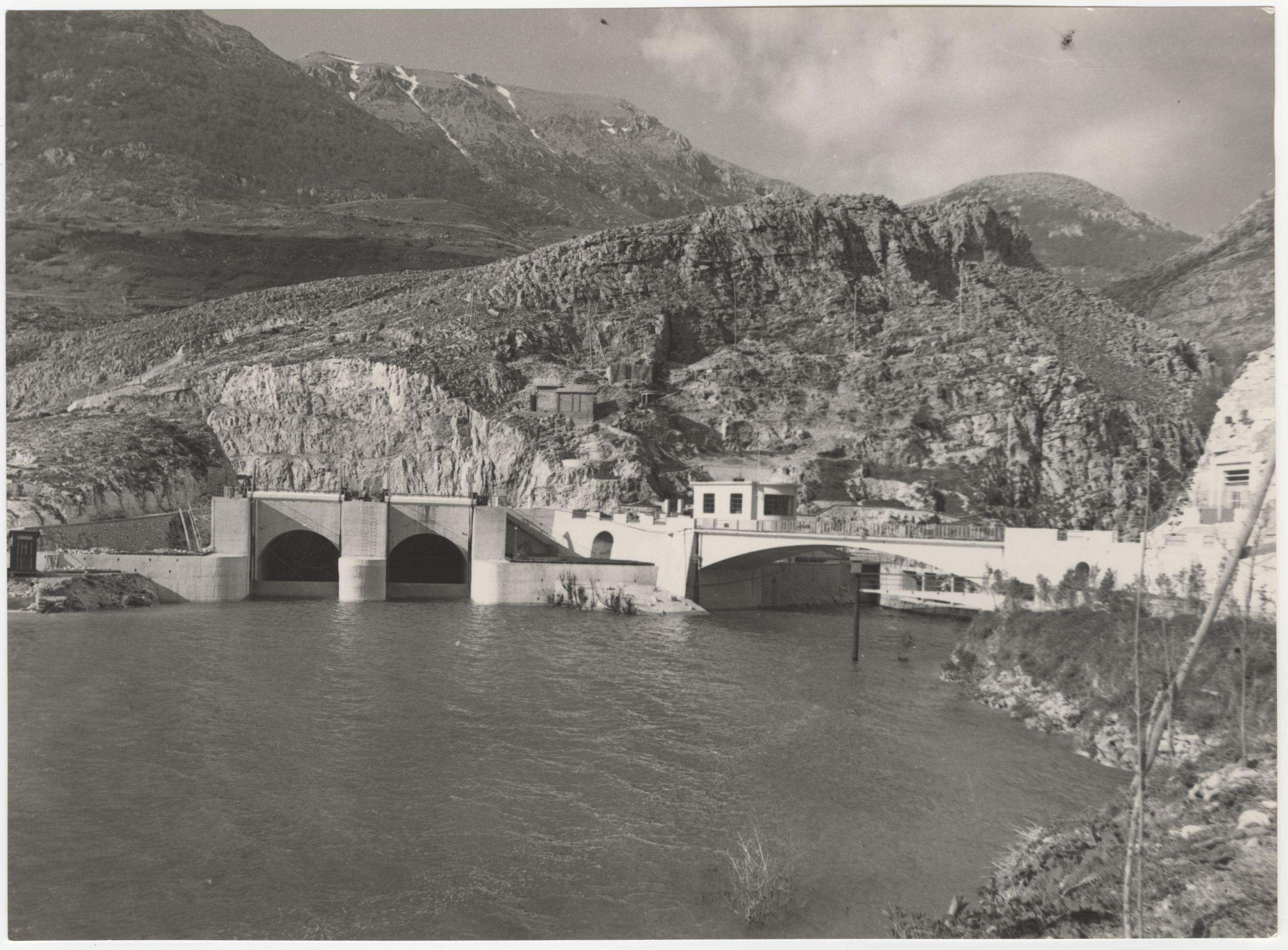
The dam on the Lake Barrea, 1954 (Archivio storico del Touring Club Italiano)

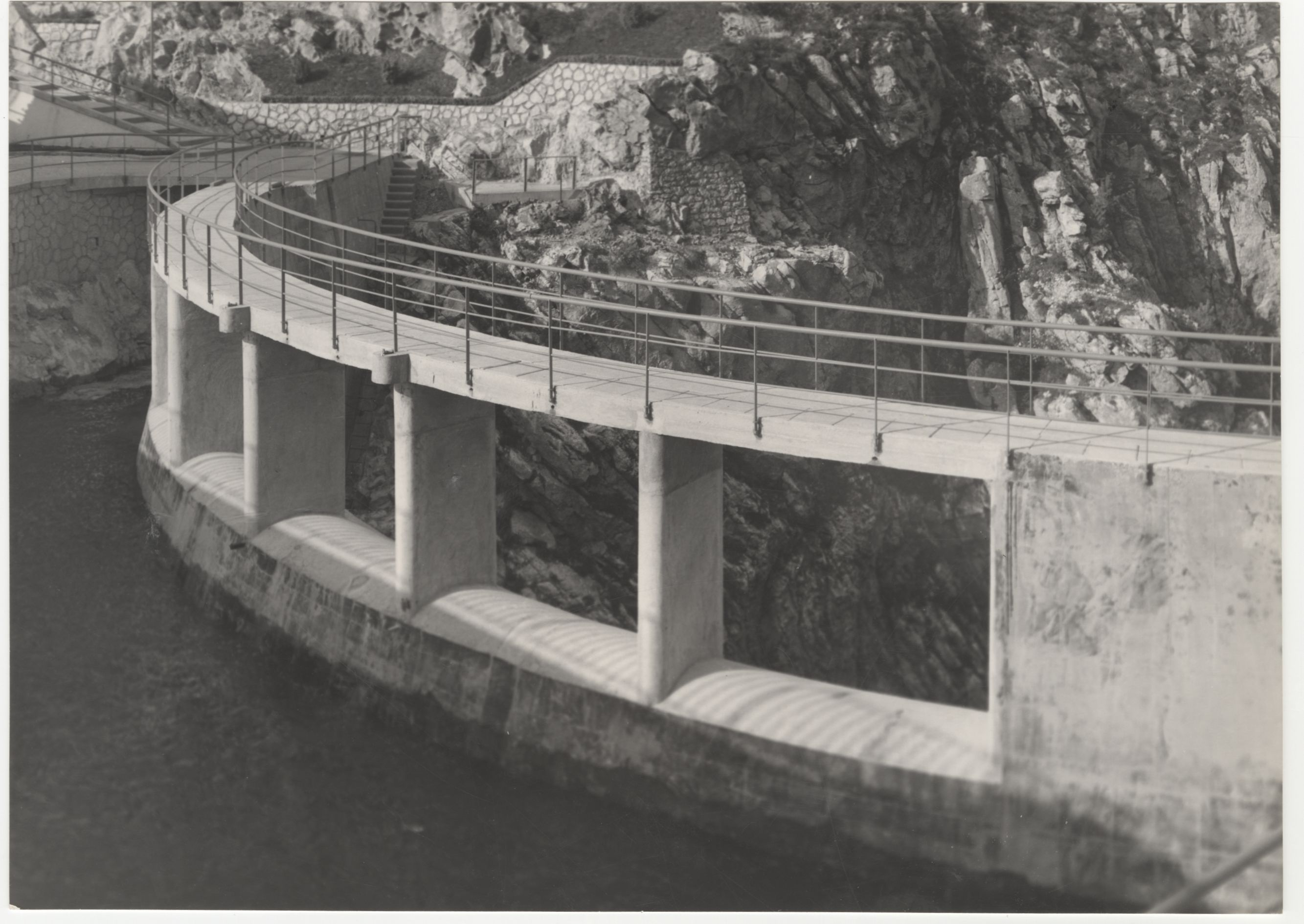
The structure of the dam of the Lake Barrea, 1954 (Archivio storico del Touring Club Italiano)
