= Sangro =

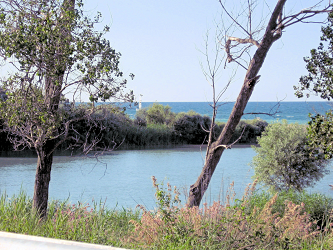
- The mouth of the Sangro

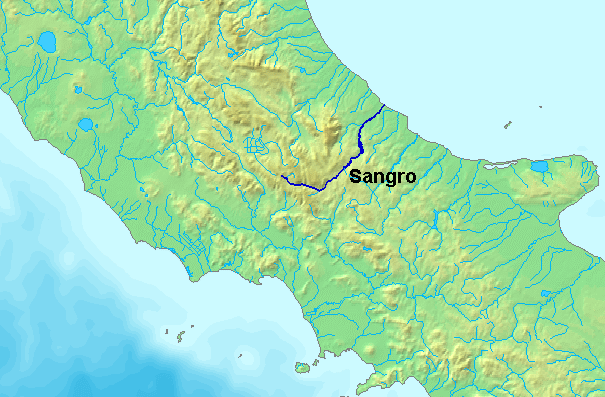
- Location of the Sangro in Italy

Location
- Country: Italy

Physical characteristics
- Source
  - location: Monte Morrone del Diavolo, elevation 1,602 m (5,256 ft), Pescasseroli
  - elevation: 1,441 m (4,728 ft)
- Mouth: Adriatic Sea
  - location: Torino di Sangro
  - coordinates: 42.2361°N 14.5426°E
- Length: 122 km (76 mi)
- Basin size: 1,545 km^{2} (597 mi^{2})
- Discharge
  - average: (at Ateleta) 9.2 m^{3}/s (320 cu ft/s) at Ateleta; about 20 m^{3}/s (710 cu ft/s) at the mouth

The Sangro is a river in eastern central Italy, known in ancient times as Sagrus from the Greek Sagros or Isagros, Ισαγρος.

It rises in the middle of Abruzzo National Park near Pescasseroli in the Apennine Mountains. It flows southeast past Pescasseroli, Opi and Villetta Barrea and flows into the artificial lake Lago di Barrea. Likewise, it then flows northeast through Alfedena, Castel di Sangro, Ateleta, Quadri, and Villa Santa Maria, before flowing into the Lago di Bomba. From there it flows northeast, where it is joined by the Aventino, then into the Adriatic Sea south of Punta Cavalluccio.

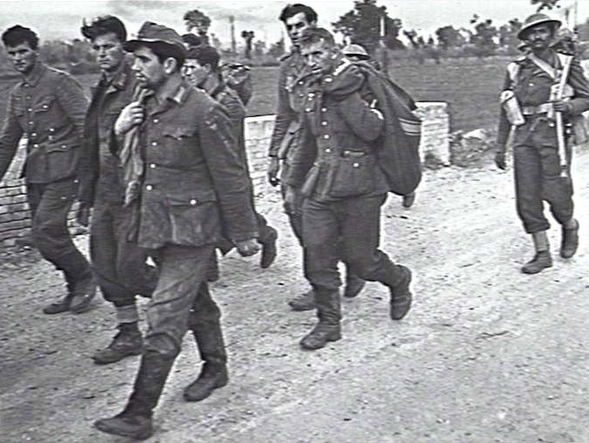
German prisoners being escorted by Indian troops after the Battle of the Sangro 1943

During World War II, the mouth of the Sangro was part of the series of German military fortifications known as the Gustav Line. The Eighth Army crossed the Sangro on 23 November 1943. This crossing was the beginning of the Allied offensive on the Winter Line defences east of the Apennines, which petered out in mid-December, having failed to secure vital cities such as Orsogna.

== See also ==
- Winter Line
