= Opi, Abruzzo =

Opi
- Comune
- Comune di Opi

- Coat of arms

- Location within Italy Location within Abruzzo
- Coordinates: 41°46′40″N 13°49′48″E
- Country: Italy
- Region: Abruzzo
- Province: L'Aquila (AQ)

Government
  - Mayor: Berardino Antonio Paglia

Area
  - Total: 49.91 km^{2} (19.27 sq mi)
- Elevation: 1,250 m (4,100 ft)

Population (28 February 2017)
  - Total: 408
  - Density: 8.17/km^{2} (21.2/sq mi)
- Demonym: Opiani
- Time zone: UTC+1 (CET)
  - Summer (DST): UTC+2 (CEST)
- Postal code: 67030
- Dialing code: 0863
- Saint day: June 24
- Website: Official website

Opi (Marsicano: Opjë [ˈoːpjə]) is a comune and town in the province of L'Aquila in the Abruzzo region of central Italy. It is located in the National Park of Abruzzo, Lazio e Molise. It is one of I Borghi più belli d'Italia ("The most beautiful villages of Italy").

== Main sights ==
- Mother Church of Santa Maria Assunta (mid-12th century)
- Church of San Giovanni Battista (late 17th century)
- Necropolis of Val Fondillo
