= Pescasseroli =

- Comune
- Comune di Pescasseroli
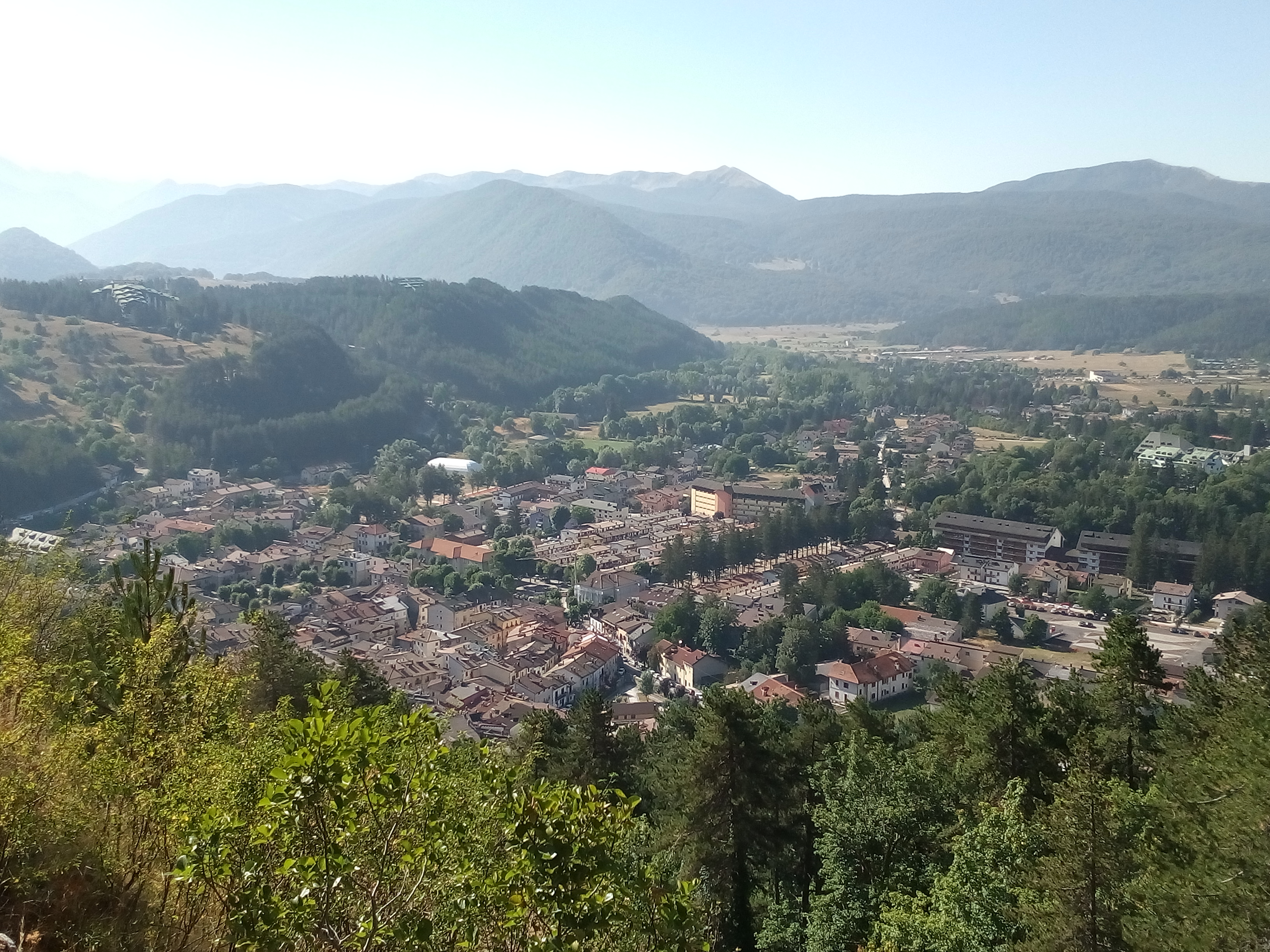

- Coat of arms

- Location within Italy Location within Abruzzo
- Coordinates: 41°48′N 13°47′E
- Country: Italy
- Region: Abruzzo
- Province: L'Aquila (AQ)

Government
  - Mayor: Anna Nanni

Area
  - Total: 92 km^{2} (36 sq mi)
- Elevation: 1,167 m (3,829 ft)

Population (31 July 2015)
  - Total: 2,206
  - Density: 24/km^{2} (62/sq mi)
- Demonym: Pescasserolesi
- Time zone: UTC+1 (CET)
  - Summer (DST): UTC+2 (CEST)
- Postal code: 67032
- Dialing code: 0863
- Patron saint: St. Paul
- Saint day: 30 June
- Website: Official website

Pescasseroli (Italian: [peskasˈsɛːroli]; Marsicano: Péšchë or zë Péšchë) is a town and comune (municipality) in the province of L'Aquila, Abruzzo, southern Italy.

A summer and winter resort, it is also the location of the Abruzzo National Park, nestled in the heart of the Monti Marsicani.

Philosopher Benedetto Croce was born there in 1866.

== History ==
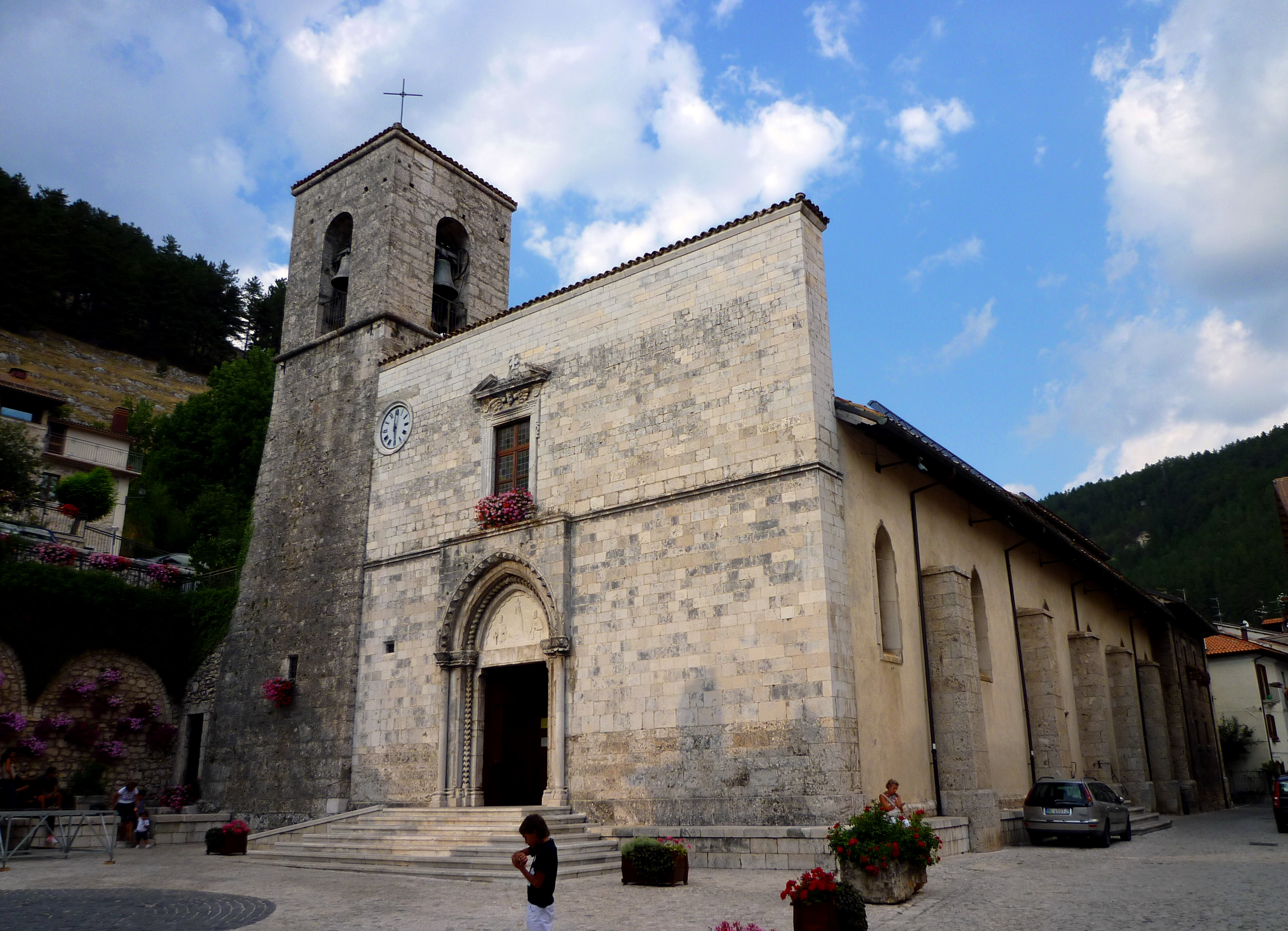
Abbey of St Peter and Paul

The domain of the Borrello Family in the 11th century, Pescasseroli passed as a 'sub-fief' of the Di Sangro family. After the fall of the Swabians, it came under the Aquinas family. In 1349, when Adenolfo II Aquinas died under the ruins of the castle of Alvito, it passed to a branch of the Counts of Loreto. In 1461, the barony of Pescasseroli was inherited by Antonella d'Aquino, Marquise of Pescara. At the end of the sixteenth century, the estate was sold to Giovan Giacomo di Sangro, who died in 1607. Put up for auction, it is recorded as having a succession of different owners until 1705, when for the price of 15,770 ducats, it was acquired by the Massa family of Sorrento. They were the last barons of Pescasseroli before the advent of the new nineteenth-century bourgeoisie, in this case exemplified by the Sipari family.

The Pescasseroli-Candela sheep route or "tratturo" started in imperial times as a military route used by the Roman legions. In the Middle Ages it became a route for sheep grazing migration from the higher and colder mountains of Abruzzo to the lower pastures of Puglia. With a distance of 211 kilometres (131 miles) it is the third longest "tratturo" in southern Italy.

== Main sights ==
- Abbey of Sts. Peter and Paul, founded around 1100. It houses a wooden statue of Madonna with Child from the 13th century.

== Tourism ==
Tourism is an important economic resource. Pescasseroli is considered the most important centre of the Abruzzo National Park. Located at the centre of several natural itineraries, the town offers a range of services and facilities that serve tourists and holidaymakers throughout the year in the protected area, including a park visitor centre, nature museum, wildlife area, botanical garden, and the ski slopes of the mountain of Vitelle, equipped with parking. The area is characterised by protected wildlife and unspoiled nature, offering a variety of flora and fauna along with related services and hospitality. All this, along with its inhabitants, makes Pescasseroli a destination for summer holidays and winter sports.

== Twin towns – sister cities ==
Pescasseroli is twinned with:

- Foggia, Italy
- Candela, Italy
- Castellane, France
- Buffalo, New York, United States

== Climate ==
Climate data for Pescasseroli, elevation 1,150 m (3,770 ft), (1951–2000)
Month	Jan	Feb	Mar	Apr	May	Jun	Jul	Aug	Sep	Oct	Nov	Dec	Year
Record high °C (°F)	17.0 (62.6)	19.7 (67.5)	20.5 (68.9)	22.0 (71.6)	29.1 (84.4)	31.0 (87.8)	35.0 (95.0)	33.8 (92.8)	31.0 (87.8)	29.8 (85.6)	21.7 (71.1)	17.7 (63.9)	35.0 (95.0)
Mean daily maximum °C (°F)	5.1 (41.2)	6.1 (43.0)	8.6 (47.5)	11.6 (52.9)	16.5 (61.7)	20.3 (68.5)	23.6 (74.5)	24.0 (75.2)	19.9 (67.8)	15.3 (59.5)	10.0 (50.0)	6.0 (42.8)	13.9 (57.0)
Daily mean °C (°F)	0.3 (32.5)	1.0 (33.8)	3.3 (37.9)	6.2 (43.2)	10.3 (50.5)	13.5 (56.3)	16.0 (60.8)	16.2 (61.2)	13.2 (55.8)	9.3 (48.7)	5.1 (41.2)	1.5 (34.7)	8.0 (46.4)
Mean daily minimum °C (°F)	−4.6 (23.7)	−4.2 (24.4)	−2.0 (28.4)	0.8 (33.4)	4.2 (39.6)	6.7 (44.1)	8.4 (47.1)	8.4 (47.1)	6.4 (43.5)	3.2 (37.8)	0.1 (32.2)	−2.8 (27.0)	2.1 (35.7)
Record low °C (°F)	−22.5 (−8.5)	−22.0 (−7.6)	−17.9 (−0.2)	−10.3 (13.5)	−7.1 (19.2)	−2.4 (27.7)	0.9 (33.6)	0.1 (32.2)	−5.9 (21.4)	−8.0 (17.6)	−16.0 (3.2)	−19.2 (−2.6)	−22.5 (−8.5)
Average precipitation mm (inches)	141.3 (5.56)	141.8 (5.58)	123.2 (4.85)	116.6 (4.59)	95.3 (3.75)	68.4 (2.69)	46.0 (1.81)	58.0 (2.28)	115.1 (4.53)	175.7 (6.92)	261.9 (10.31)	234.6 (9.24)	1,577.9 (62.11)
Average precipitation days	10.1	9.6	11.1	11.4	10.9	8.2	6.1	5.8	8.1	9.9	12.0	12.0	115.2
Source: Regione Abruzzo

== See also ==
- Abruzzo National Park
- 24 Hours in Pescasseroli – Capital of Italy’s First & Oldest National Park
