= Villetta Barrea =

- Comune
- Comune di Villetta Barrea
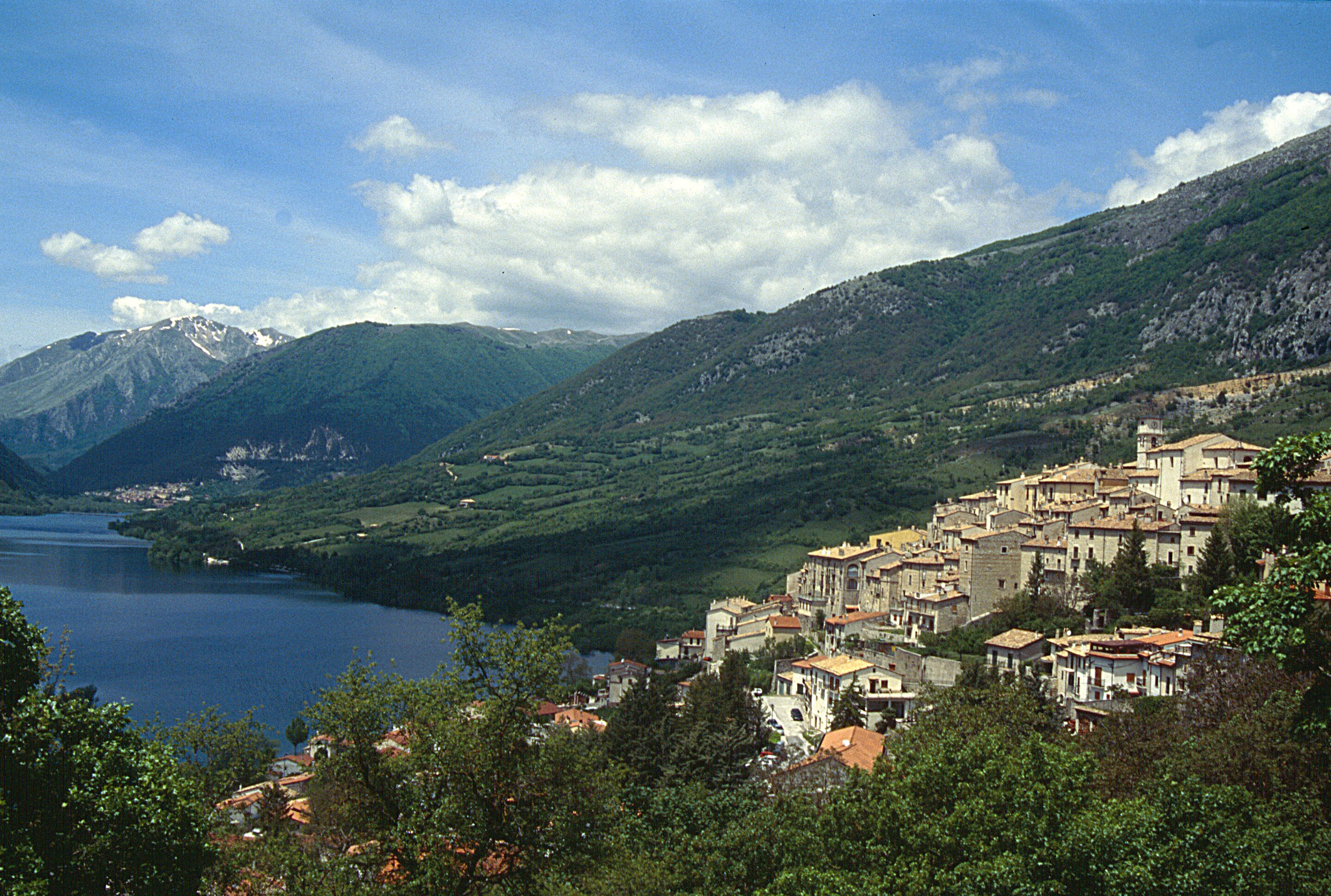

- Coat of arms

- Location within Italy Location within Abruzzo
- Coordinates: 41°46′36″N 13°56′22″E
- Country: Italy
- Region: Abruzzo
- Province: L'Aquila (AQ)

Government
  - Mayor: Giuseppina Colantoni

Area
  - Total: 20.53 km^{2} (7.93 sq mi)
- Elevation: 990 m (3,250 ft)

Population (31 December 2015)
  - Total: 653
  - Density: 31.8/km^{2} (82.4/sq mi)
- Demonym: Villettesi
- Time zone: UTC+1 (CET)
  - Summer (DST): UTC+2 (CEST)
- Postal code: 67030
- Dialing code: 0864
- Patron saint: St. Vincent Martyr
- Website: Official website

Villetta Barrea (Abruzzese: La Villa, La Vëllétta) is a comune and town in the province of L'Aquila, in the Abruzzo region of central Italy.

Its territory, located within the Monti Marsicani, is crossed by the Sangro river, which here receives its first affluents, the Scerto and Profluo.
