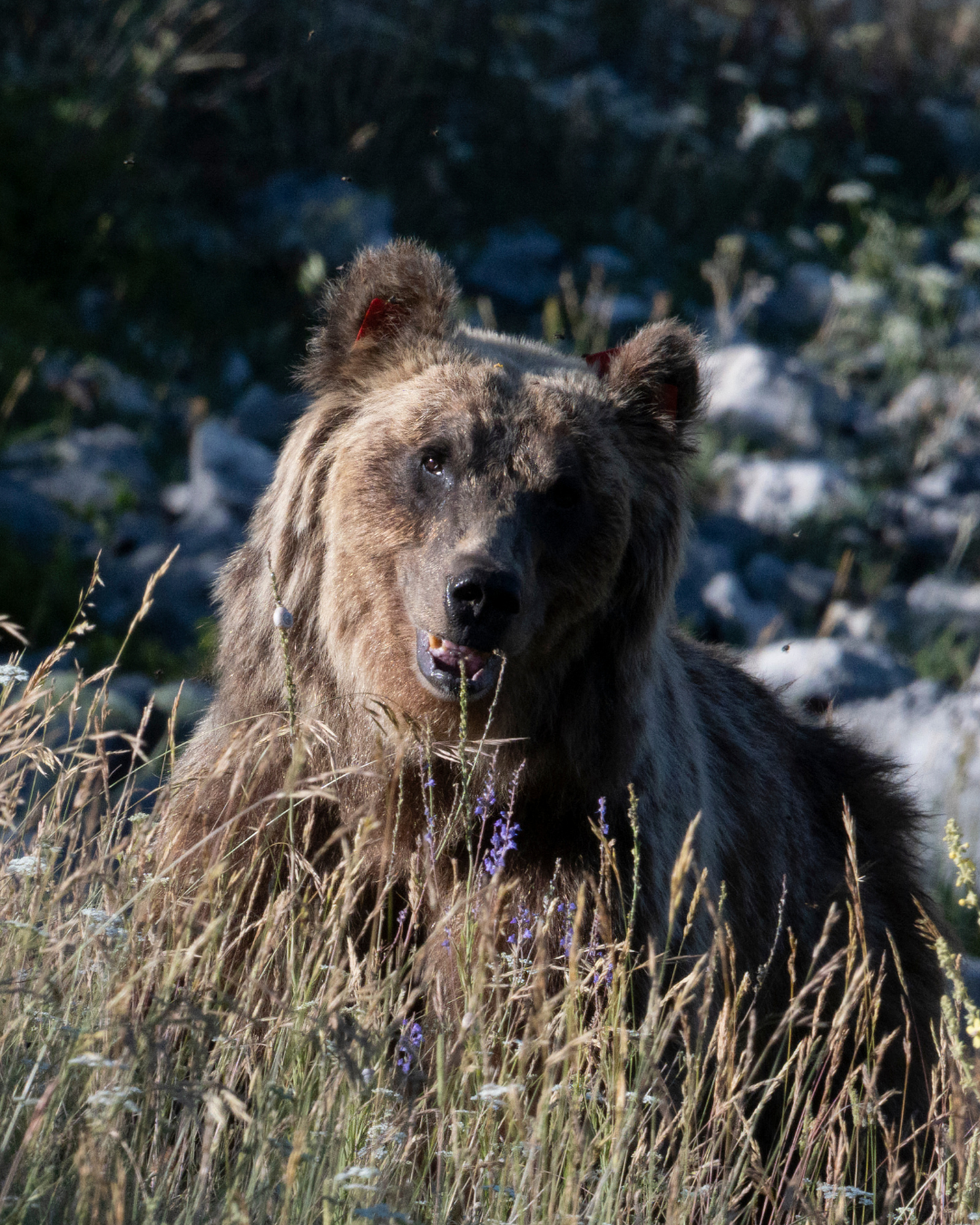
- "Giacomina", a female Marsican brown bear

Conservation status
- Critically Endangered (IUCN 3.1)

- Endangered (ESA)

Scientific classification
- Kingdom: Animalia
- Phylum: Chordata
- Class: Mammalia
- Order: Carnivora
- Family: Ursidae
- Genus: Ursus
- Species: U. arctos
- Subspecies: U. a. arctos
- Population: Marsican brown bear

Synonyms
- Ursus arctos marsicanus

= Marsican brown bear =

Population of the brown bear

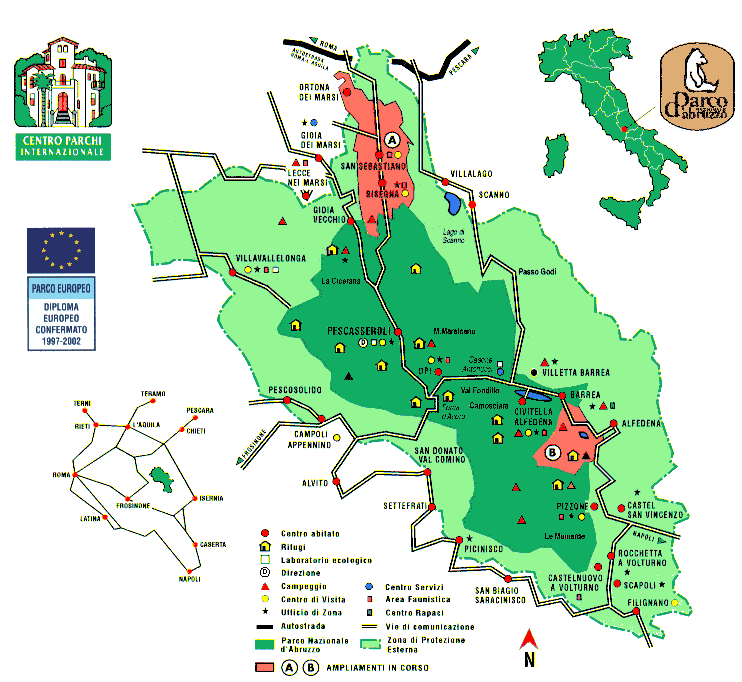
A broad view of the National Park of Abruzzo

The Marsican brown bear (Ursus arctos arctos, formerly Ursus arctos marsicanus), also known as the Apennine brown bear, is a critically endangered population of the Eurasian brown bear, with a range restricted to the Abruzzo, Lazio and Molise National Park, and the surrounding region in Italy. The Marsican brown bear differs slightly from other brown bears in its appearance and hibernation techniques. The bear's popular name is derived from Marsica, a historic area of the modern-day region of Abruzzo where the bear has long had a significant presence.

With their existence dwindling, the Italian government has recently begun to stress their conservation. The park has become a sanctuary dedicated to animals such as the Marsican brown bear, with hopes of rekindling the large, yet isolative bears' once-thriving existence. Debate exists as to whether it should be considered a subspecies or a taxon of its own.

== Characteristics/biology ==
The Marsican brown bear lives its life in isolation and their numbers are dwindling, with 50 bears remaining in the Abruzzo, Lazio and Molise National Park. They have characteristics that differ from other brown bear subspecies. The Marsican brown bear, otherwise known as the Apennine brown bear, has a relatively calm temperament, with no aggression shown towards humans. In terms of size, the male Marsican brown bear is larger than most of the other brown bear subspecies, with a weight of around 217 kilograms (478 pounds), while the female is significantly smaller, at around 140 kilograms (310 pounds). These bears are known to be omnivorous in nature, mainly eating berries, while occasionally eating small animals such as chickens and other livestock. All of these traits the bear shows can likely be attributed to its existence in isolation. Baby Marsican brown bears tend to grow up fairly quickly. In a standing position, the Marsican brown bear can reach heights of up to two metres. Their large size, as well as noticeably different forepaws to their rear are characteristics that help distinguish their presence. The footprints, hair residue, colour of faeces, and claw marks the bears leave are special to their species. These large mammals have been spotted rolling rocks over in search of insects as well as reaching high into branches looking for berries, honey, etc. Their great sense of smell makes up for their mediocre eyesight when it comes to searching for food. A characteristic of the Marsican brown bear is that their winter hibernation is not made up of a single consecutive slumber. The bear wakes at times, which makes their official resurgence less lethargic.

Through the years, the Marsican brown bear became the symbol of the Abruzzo, Lazio and Molise National Park and lent its name to pan dell'orso (bear bread) and other traditional regional foods. Thanks to its presence, ecotourism improved in the whole Abruzzi region, though conflicts with shepherds and honey farmers are still reported. In prehistoric times, hundreds of bears used to live in these mountains.

== Behaviour ==
The Marsican brown bear's behaviour is relatively typical of any brown bear. These bears are mainly nocturnal, except when with their cubs, or mating, where they seem to be very independent and self-contained. Mating season for these bears is usually between May and July, landing birthing of the cubs in early winter. Around February every year females give birth anywhere from one to three cubs, weighing less than 500 grams (18 oz) at birth, but heavily relying on the size of their mother.

Marsican brown bear cubs grow up very quickly because of their mother's fat-induced milk they feed on, allowing them to roam on their own and be independent after only a few months of existence. On average, Marsican Brown Bear cubs stay with their mothers for a little over a year. As they grow older, females become fertile and sexually mature at around age three, allowing reproduction early in the mother's life.

These bears mature very quickly and develop a very good sense of hearing and smell, which helps them find food and roam their environment. In contrast, the eyesight of the Marsican brown bear is rather ordinary, or average.

=== Diet ===
As they start to grow, they turn to eating more of a plant-based diet including grass, fruit, berries, etc. Because they are omnivores, it is a common pattern seen with this specific subspecies of brown bears.

The bear's favorite food is the buckthorn berry, which they feast on in the late summer time in the mountains of the Abruzzo park, where the remainder of the subspecies live. Other components of their diet include meat, eating carcasses as well as hunting for certain wild animals, which is why they are not considered a harmful predator to those around them. On the other hand, some domestic animals, including sheep, chickens, turkeys and a few others may fall victim to the bear and its sharp claws. Aside from its eating habits, the Marsican brown bear also learns to begin to look for a dry and safe place to spend its winter.

== Environment ==
The few remaining Marsican brown bears are in the Abruzzo, Lazio and Molise National Park, where high peaks merge into woodland, with much water and land, with scattered villages. Although wooded environments are usually preferred, it is not uncommon for bears to reach high altitude grasslands or cultivated areas on valley floors.

There are roughly only 50 of these bears left mainly due to loss of habitat. They are often killed accidentally by being poisoned, or hit by motor vehicles; and intentionally by poaching. Bears often travel in Abruzzo to the high-altitude meadows in the summer, and then down to the warmer areas of valley when the temperatures start to cool. As the temperature decreases, the bears learn awareness to start looking for a dormitory, and planning out their winter.

In their dens they relax and slow down, requiring less food and adjust to the colder temperatures. Bears will isolate in their dens most of winter, but are not in full hibernation, unlike most animals. Bears keep a reasonable level of consciousness and awareness to their external changes throughout the winter, and might even take a stroll on a sunny day. This period of time is where all of the fat build-up throughout the year becomes critical, as they need enough fat to burn to stay alive. They do not fully sustain themselves during this period, and use the extra fat burning off for energy reserve as well as a thermal resource.

Overall, these bears are very good at living as an individual, and do not face many other threats in their environment except for poachers. Being omnivores, these bears can adapt themselves to diverse habitats, and thrive as long as they are not disturbed often, and have a developed source of food nearby.

== Range ==
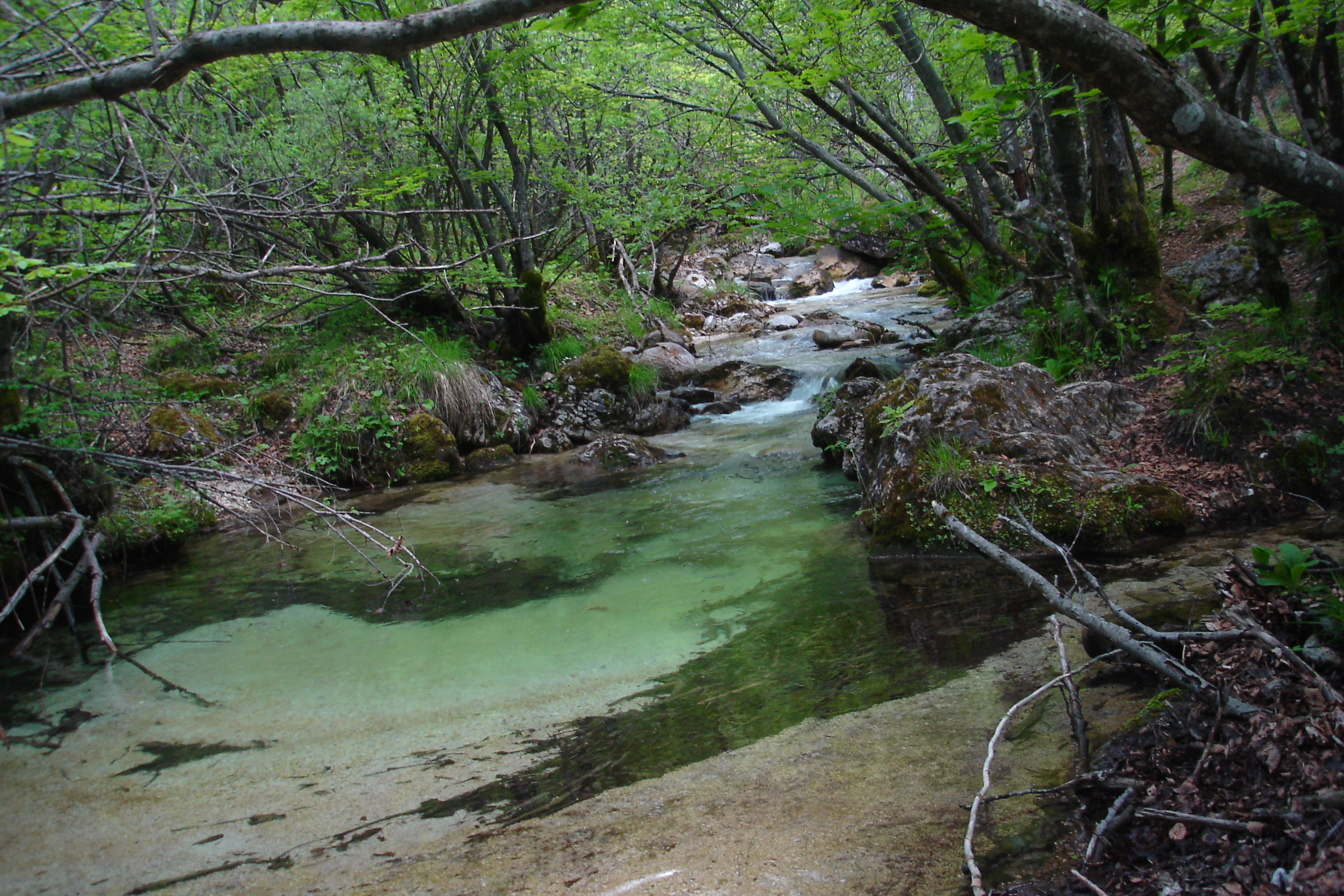
The National Park of Abruzzo, Lazio, and Molise with a wide range of environments like rivers, forests, and mountains

The Marsican brown bear has a small, isolated population. It is found is the central Apennine Mountains in Italy where there are a range of settings like lakes, woods, and settlements of citizens. They are usually found in the Abruzzo, Lazio and Molise National Park. This park consists of valleys and a section of the Apennine Mountains in Italy. This enclosed, though lush, area is a likely factor for why the endangered subspecies is not leaving. This part of the country consists of mainly beechwood, which the bear is particularly fond of, though grasslands and meadows can be found at higher altitudes as well. This bear may also be found in these nearby locations: Sibillini National Park, Gran Sasso-Laga National Park, Sirente-Velino Regional Park, and Simbruini Regional Park.

The population range of the Marsican brown bear has been significantly reduced over the past hundreds of years. Since they emerged in an isolated area, it does have a smaller population compared to other brown bears, but it has been on the brink of extinction for decades now. In the 1980s, there were about 100 of them, but currently there is an estimate of about 43 bears on average still living in this area. Only about 10–12 of the Marsican brown bears living in this area are females that are able to reproduce. In Italy, their state of critical endangerment has been stressed greatly by government officials, for their extinction is still a possibility. According to Giuseppe Rossi, "the number of bears have fallen below the threshold of survival."

The Marsican brown bear is completely isolated from its nearest neighbours, a population of Eurasian brown bears in the Italian Alps. It could expand its range though, as there is suitable habitat throughout the Apennines.

== Conservation ==
The Marsican brown bear, as a subspecies of the brown bear, has been included on the International Union for Conservation of Nature (IUCN) Red List and Appendix I of the Convention on International Trade in Endangered Species of Wild Fauna and Flora. People have started to acknowledge and support the need for conservation of these bears. Ecotourism has improved the urgency for conservation of these areas.

Italy officially protected the Marsican brown bear in 1923 by founding the Abruzzo, Lazio and Molise National Park. which has had a major impact in conserving the bears. They ensure that habitats will stay intact or preserve more, supplying more food to the bears, and implement policies that will reduce bear-human conflicts. Another effort made by Italians is the Piano d'Azione Nazionale per la Tutela dell'Orso Bruno Marsicano (PATOM), which was formed to help protect the bears.

During 2001, the Italian Ministry of the Environment for Protection of the Territory and the Sea created the action plan for the Conservation of the Marsican brown bear. It made the collection of basic health data of the Marsican brown bear a very important priority. It studied common diseases around the area. It has a specific attention to infectious diseases that could affect the bears and local wildlife.

Up until 2014, Italy and the European Union teamed up to conserve the bears in the Apennine Mountains. It was called the Life Arctos Project. It was partially funded by the European Union at a cost of $7.3 million. They planted trees closer to the hills, away from civilians to prevent bear-human interactions. They put up electric fences around farms and vegetable gardens to push the Marsican brown bears away from humans. Pushing them higher in the mountains helps prevent human-bear interaction and resupply the food supply that is slowly being lost.

Hunting has been a problem in conserving the bears, whether it was legal or illegal. However, poaching has decreased in numbers, so the population may be increasing. One measure in their conservation is controlling how the land will be used in the future. There are discussions about whether diseases from the cattle will spread and kill off the Marsican brown bears. In addition, it is suggested that there be more plans to preserve their habitats and food.

According to the IUCN the brown bear as a whole is classified as "Least Concern", however there are subspecies that are classified as "Critically Endangered".
