= Monte Castelfraiano =

Mountain in Abruzzo, Italy

Castel Fraiano
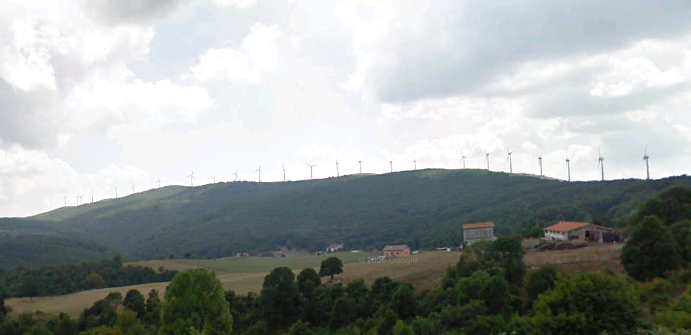
- Castel Fraiano seen from the Lupara plain

Highest point
- Elevation: 1,415 m (4,642 ft)
- Coordinates: 41.885511°N 14.408939°E

Geography
- Country: Italy
- Region: Abruzzo
- Parent range: Apennines

Castel Fraiano is a mountain in the Samnite Southern Apennines, located in the Province of Chieti, within the territory of the municipality of Castiglione Messer Marino. At 1,415 m a.s.l., it is the highest peak of the Monti Frentani.

== Geography ==
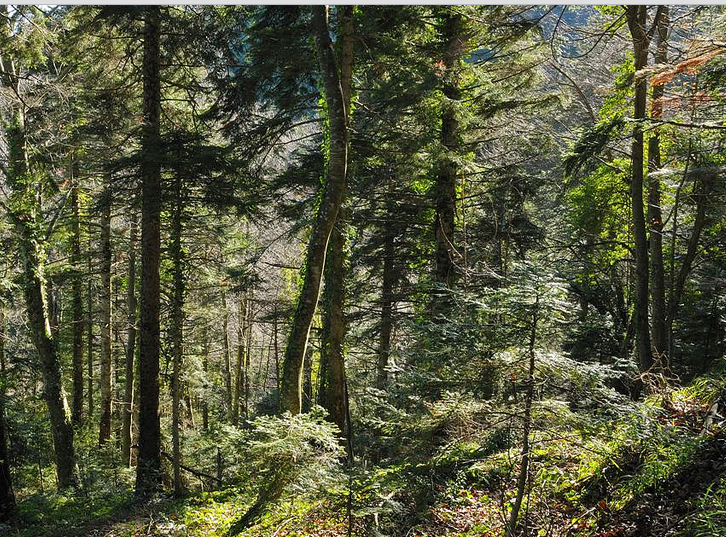
Abetina di Selva Grande

Characterized by very gentle shapes, the mountain offers a wide panorama spanning from the Majella massif to the Mainarde, from the Monti Pizi to the Matese, from the Val di Sangro to Alto Molise, from to the Adriatic Sea.

The main rivers originating from this or nearby mountains, which effectively demarcate their separation, are the Sinello, the Sente, and the Treste. The first two separate Castel Fraiano from Monte Fischietto and Colle dell’Albero, or from Montecastelbarone, while the last serves this role between the southern extensions of the Castel Fraiano and Colle dell’Albero reliefs.

The slopes of this relief vary. The part facing the Val di Sangro is characterized by an almost complete absence of shrubby flora, replaced by pastures that once provided fodder for livestock, while the side facing the Sinello valley features a mixed forest of beeches and silver firs of community interest, protected by the Oasi naturale Abetina di Selva Grande.

At the foot of the mountain, on the southwest slope, there is also a small, figure-eight-shaped lake in the process of silting up, named Lago la Croce.

=== Wind farm ===
This mountain, like those surrounding it, has been subject, since 2001, to the installation of 44 wind turbines ranging from ninety to one hundred meters in height, implemented after the signing of two thirty-year agreements between the Municipality of Castiglione and two companies of the Edison group.

== Environment ==
=== Flora ===
The flora primarily consists of the plants and shrubs of the Oasi di Selva Grande. Among the most significant species are undoubtedly the silver fir, very rare in the Southern Apennines, and the beech, alongside various other species including: the maple (Acer lobelii), the yew, the lime, the European ash, the wych elm, the hornbeam, the Turkey oak, the hazel, the rowan, and in the undergrowth the crocus, the scilla, the Solomon’s seal, and the columbine.

=== Fauna ===
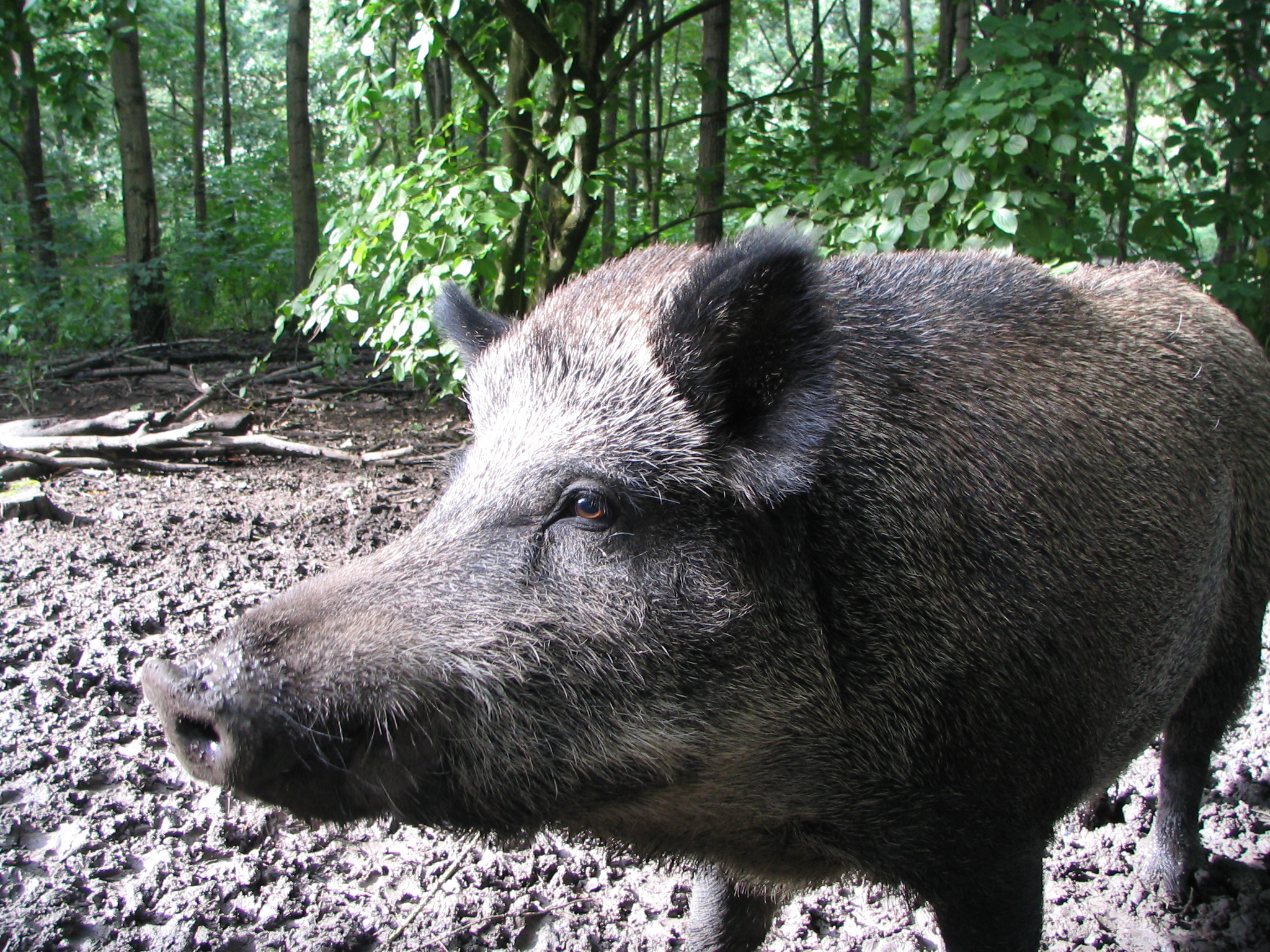
Wild boar specimen

The fauna is typical of Apennine woodlands.

- The group of mammals is dominated by a significant presence of wild boars and a smaller number of roe deer, deer, hares, wildcats, pine martens, foxes, and badgers. A prominent place is occupied by the wolf, whose constant presence has effectively given the name to the medieval fiefdom of Lupara.
- Among the birds, various species of woodpeckers, the northern goshawk, the red kite, the sparrowhawk, the common buzzard, the tawny owl, the nocturnal sparrowhawk, the chaffinch, the bullfinch, the goldcrest, the firecrest, and various species of tits.
- Finally, the amphibians present are represented by the spectacled salamander and the fire salamander.

== History ==
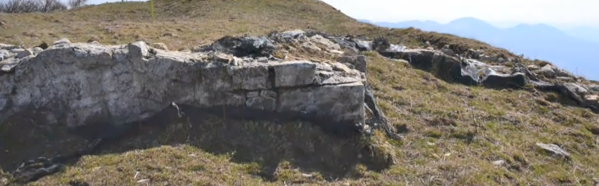
Castle ruins

Among the testimonies of the past that have reached us are the high-altitude fortress of Castelfraiano, the medieval Church of Santa Maria del Monte, and the Ateleta-Biferno transhumance trail, all essentially related to periods following the High Middle Ages.

- The castle, which also gave its name to the mountain, is located at the summit, and its primary purpose was to oversee the passage of shepherds during transhumance, as well as to regulate access from Monteferrante and the Val di Sangro. Today, only ruins remain of the military complex.
- The church, whose current form is the result of reconstruction following World War II, was part of a convent of Conventual Friars Minor, of which it is the only remaining building. It still plays an important role in the religious life of Castiglione Messer Marino, as it was built on the site of an apparition of the Virgin, making it a particularly cherished place of worship for the inhabitants of the town and neighboring areas.
- The transhumance trail ran alongside the beds of the main rivers, passing through the high-altitude pasture of Lupara and Monte Fischietto. Its importance is evident in the traditions and dialect of Castiglione, strongly influenced by Puglian culture. Further evidence of the impact of transhumance on these places is provided by the types of buildings constructed here: tower-houses and tholos of dry stone, typical examples of pastoral culture.
