= No. 226 Squadron RAF =

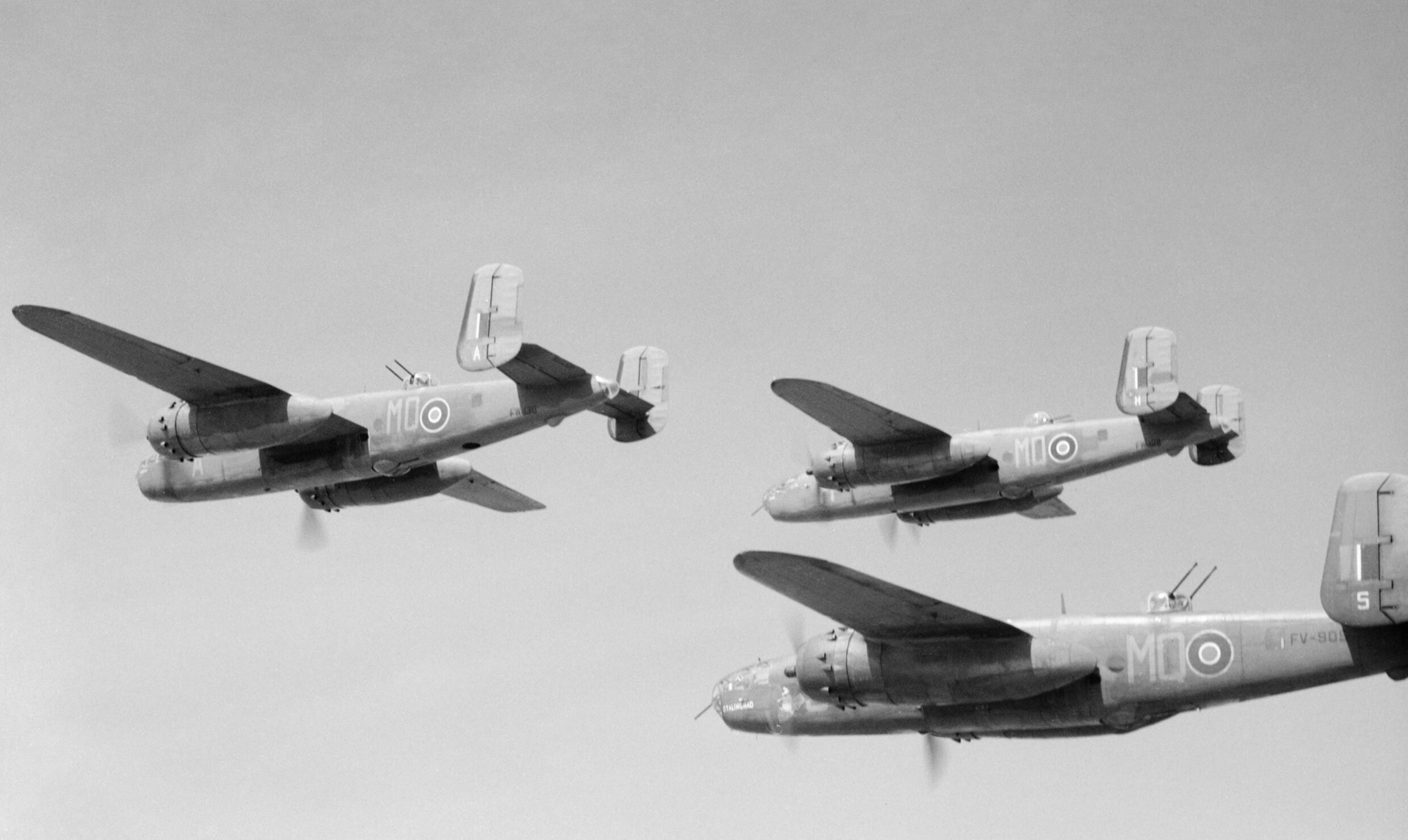
- Three North American Mitchell Mark IIs of No. 226 Squadron about to bomb railway yards in northern France on the evening of 12 May 1944
- Active: 1 April–18 December 1918; 15 March 1937–20 September 1945; 1 August 1959 – 9 March 1963
- Disbanded: 1963
- Country: United Kingdom
- Branch: Royal Air Force
- Type: Squadron
- Role: Strategic Missile Force
- Garrison/HQ: Pizzone & Taranto, Italy, 1918; RAF Upper Heyford, 16 April 1937–2 September 1939; Reims–Champagne (France), 2 September 1939 – 16 May 1940; Faux-Villecerf (France), 16 May – 15 June 1940; Artins (France), 15–16 June 1940; RAF Thirsk, 18–27 June 1940; RAF Sydenham, 27 June 1940 – 26 May 1941; RAF Wattisham, 26 May–9 December 1941; RAF Swanton Morley, 9 December 1941 – 13 February 1944; RAF Hartford Bridge, 13 February–17 October 1944; B.50 Vitry-en-Artois, 17 October 1944 – 22 April 1945; B.77 Gilze-Rijen, 22 April–20 September 1945; RAF Catfoss, 1 August 1959–9 March 1963
- Mottos: Non sibi sed patriœ ("For country not for self")
- Aircraft: Airco D.H.4; Airco D.H.9; Sopwith Camel; Hawker Audax; Fairey Battle; Bristol Blenheim de Havilland Mosquito; Douglas Havoc; Douglas Boston; North American Mitchell; Airspeed Oxford; Thor (IRBM)
- Engagements: World War II: Battle of France; German invasion of Luxembourg; Operation Overlord; Cuban Missile Crisis

Insignia
- Squadron Codes: KP, MQ

No. 226 Squadron RAF was a unit of the British Royal Air Force that existed as a bomber squadron during the First and Second World Wars, and as part of the UK's nuclear ballistic missile force in the early 1960s.

== Squadron history ==
First formed on 1 April 1918 at Pizzone, Italy, by re-designating the Bombing School Pizzone, No. 226 Squadron operated fast bombers and fighter aircraft and formed No. 472, 473 and 474 (Fighter) Flights within it in September 1918. After the Armistice the squadron was disbanded at Taranto, Italy.

As part of the re-armament plan No. 226 Squadron was reformed at RAF Upper Heyford, as a light bomber squadron, on 15 March 1937, flying Fairey Battle light bombers. Deployed to France as part of the Advanced Air Striking Force, No. 226 Squadron suffered heavy losses during the Battle of France, retreating westwards and evacuating from Brest in mid-June 1940.

The squadron was re-assembled at RAF Sydenham, moving to East Anglia and re-equipping with Douglas Havoc, Douglas Boston and North American Mitchell medium bombers, whilst carrying out attacks on German ports and anti-shipping strikes.

Operation Overlord in 1944 saw No. 226 Squadron become part of the 2nd Tactical Air Force, supporting the invasion in Normandy and the Allied advance to Germany. The squadron was disbanded shortly after hostilities ceased, at Gilze-Rijen airfield, on 20 September 1945.

The squadron was reformed in 1959 as one of twenty Strategic Missile (SM) squadrons associated with Project Emily equipped with three Douglas PGM-17 Thor Intermediate range ballistic missiles, based at RAF Catfoss in Yorkshire as part of the Driffield group of Thor launch sites.

During the 1962 Cuban Missile Crisis, the squadron was kept at full readiness, with the missiles aimed at strategic targets in the USSR. Resolution of the missile crisis included the de-activation of the Thor and Jupiter IRBMs in the United Kingdom, Italy and Turkey. The squadron was disbanded with the termination of Project Emily in 1963.
