= San Biagio Saracinisco =

- Comune
- Comune di San Biagio Saracinisco
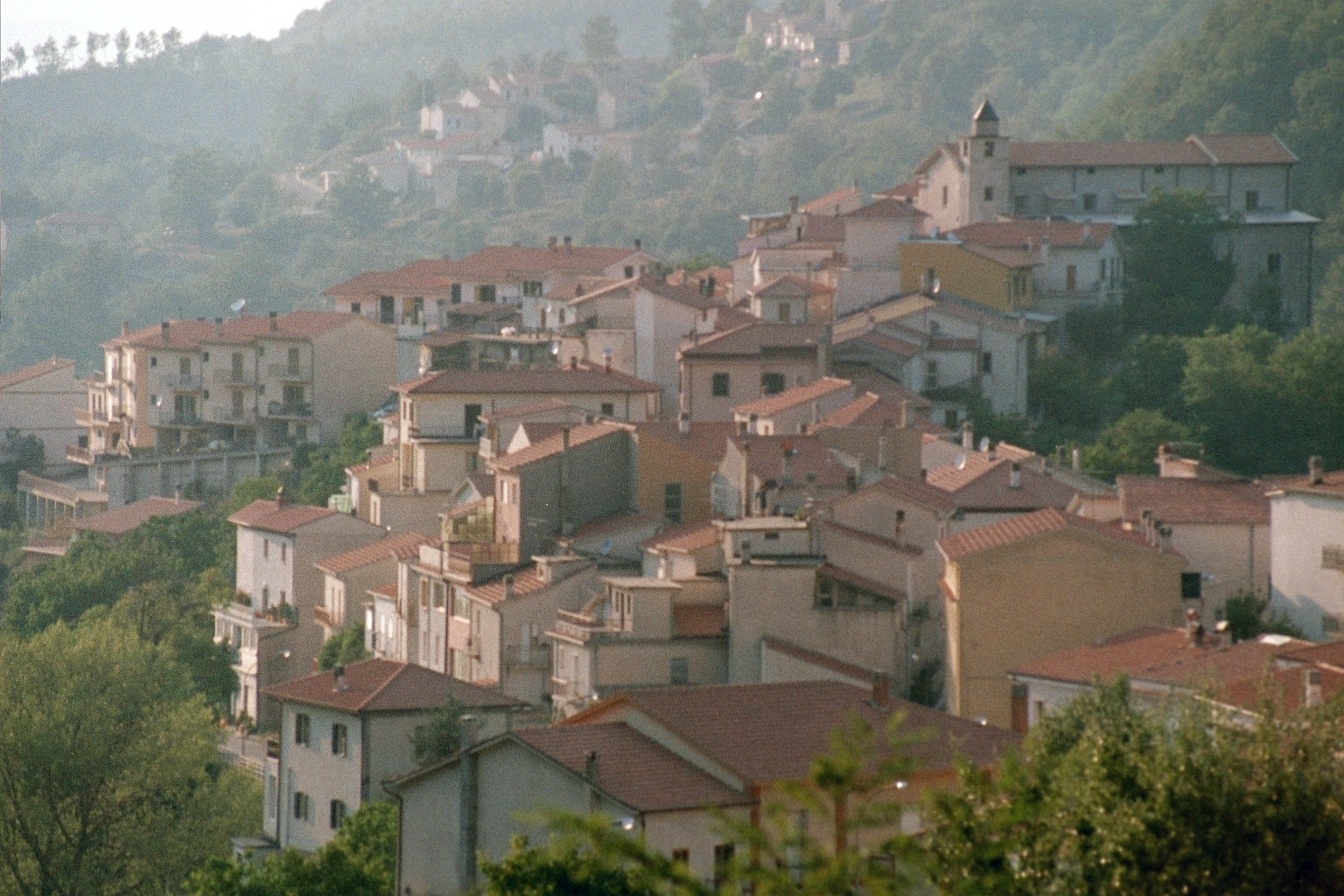
- View of San Biagio Saracinisco

- Coat of arms

- Location within Italy Location within Lazio
- Coordinates: 41°37′N 13°56′E
- Country: Italy
- Region: Lazio
- Province: Frosinone (FR)

Government
  - Mayor: Dario Giustino Iaconelli

Area
  - Total: 31.21 km^{2} (12.05 sq mi)
- Elevation: 836 m (2,743 ft)

Population (28 February 2017)
  - Total: 336
  - Density: 10.8/km^{2} (27.9/sq mi)
- Demonym: Sanbiagesi
- Time zone: UTC+1 (CET)
  - Summer (DST): UTC+2 (CEST)
- Postal code: 03040
- Dialing code: 0776
- Website: Official website

San Biagio Saracinisco is a comune (municipality) in the Province of Frosinone in the Italian region of Lazio, located about 120 kilometres (75 mi) east of Rome and about 50 kilometres (31 mi) east of Frosinone.

San Biagio Saracinisco borders the following municipalities: Castel San Vincenzo, Picinisco, Pizzone, Rocchetta a Volturno, Sant'Elia Fiumerapido and Vallerotonda.

== Geography ==
The village of San Biagio Sarasinisco in the south of the Lazio is situated halfway between Rome and Naples, 36 kilometres (22 mi) from Monte Cassino. It belongs to the Abruzzo, Lazio e Molise National Park, the largest in Italy. The village is on a hill, 866 metres (2,841 ft) above sea level. It counts 364 inhabitants, and a surface area of 31 square kilometres (12 mi^{2}).

It is surrounded by numerous rocky peaks: Mount Meta, elevation 2,241 metres (7,352 ft), Mount Mare, elevation 2,020 metres (6,630 ft), Mount Cavallo at 2,039 metres (6,690 ft), Mount Cavio at 1,699 metres (5,574 ft) and Mount Santa Croce.

Lake Selva is an artificial lake, situated between the hamlets of Pratolla (San Biagio) and Fontana Cicchetto, built in 1956 to feed the hydroelectric power station of Cassino. It has a capacity of 2 million cubic metres (71,000,000 cu ft).

=== Earthquakes ===
The region has suffered repeatedly from earthquakes on: 9 September 1349, 13 July 1873, 15 January 1915, and on 7 and 11 May 1984.

=== Population ===
In 1656, plague decimated the whole population and 20 years were needed to restore the number of inhabitants. In 1874, 300 people died of cholera. In 1918, 80 people died of the Spanish flu.

Two main flows of emigration marked the evolution of the population: in 1915 a first wave (approximately one quarter) moved to Rome, Milan, Paris, Berlin etc.; after 1960 a second wave (half of the population) left the village to go to foreign countries in Northern Europe, but also to the United States and Brazil.

== History ==
=== Etymology ===
San Biagio (Saint Blaise), whose relics are in many local churches, is revered by the Benedictine Monks of the Monte Cassino Abbey, set up in 529 on land above the Valley of Comino. The term Saracinisco may result whether of Caraceni, a pre-Roman tribe, whose name evolved in Caracenisco, then transformed into Saracinisco, or of the Saracens (in Latin Saraceni). The Samnite Wars opposed the Romans and the Samnites (including Caraceni), who settled down a fortified camp in this place.

=== Before the Christian Era ===
For a very long time, approximately 70,000 years, this place has been inhabited. That's why vestiges of the Paleolithic have been found, e.g. graves with pottery and weapons. These people lived in natural caves in the mountains.

Little by little they abandoned this natural housing environment in favor of small strengthened installations made of polygonal walls on the plateau of Mount Santa Croce. Excavations made in the place known as Omini Morti brought to light a necropolis of Etruscan type with skeletons adorned with bronze belts, iron lances, jewels as well as vases enameled in terracotta and painted. These objects give evidence of trade with the valley. They also ran iron and silver mines, extracted from Mount Meta.

Because of its closeness with the way Sora-Venafro-Capua, which winds between the mountains, this village and many around were less controlled than the ones on the way between Rome and Naples situated in the plain, so they were the theater of numerous revolts and wars against the Roman power, particularly against the slavery in the 4th and 3rd centuries BC.

=== Monte Cassino Abbey ===
After the fall of the Roman Empire, the territory was successively occupied by the Ostrogoths of Alaric I (410), the Vandals (476), the Herules, then the Lombards and the Saracens. In 1055 Pandolfo and Landolfo, Lords of Capua, gave this land to the monks of Monte Cassino who lent the ground to shepherds living in Picinisco, Agnone and Atina, Lazio.

In the middle of the 17th century, nearly the whole population was decimated by an epidemic of plague. In 1678 the monks decided to set up a chapel to Saint Blaise; some families coming from Cervaro, San Vittore del Lazio, Rocca d'Evandro and Cassino settled there. Under the Napoleonic period (from 1806 to 1815) there were about 500 inhabitants and the village was under the administration of Vallerotonda.

=== Robberies ===
This vast territory full of crevices and natural caves was an ideal place for thieves to hide. In the 16th century, Swadan (leader of a gang) with his men used to attack villages and rob travelers. In December 1546, 100 ducats were offered in order to catch him. The poverty and the misery were the reasons of this phenomenon. He was followed by Colamattei di Sant'Elia, Cristoforo Valente Di Cervaro, Mezza di Casalattico, Domenico Fuoco di San Pietro. The robbery came to an end only in the middle of the 19th century under the reign of Ferdinand II of the Two Sicilies. It is said that there is still somewhere in the mountains a hidden treasure.

=== Autonomy ===
By decree of Ferdinand II, King of Naples, in 1858, the village obtained its autonomy with more than 1000 inhabitants, and became the town of San Biagio Sarasinisco, in the province of Terra Laboris. In the second part of the 19th century, the numbers of farmers and (cow and goat) breeders increased so that they became poorer and poorer. This fact triggers the first wave of emigration.

=== Beginning of the 20th century ===
The demographic curve reaches his highest level in 1911 with 1570 inhabitants. The poverty forced a quarter of them to move to the big northern Italian cities, to Germany, to France, Switzerland, Scotland, England, Sweden and even the United States. World War I and the Spanish flu of 1918 were two others factors which decreased the population. So in 1931, there were 1019 inhabitants.

=== Between the world wars ===
This period was a profound evolution with the advent of the fascism. In the village big construction began: pavements on Piazza Marconi, a stony wall on Piazza Croce, a stony fountain in the village, a wall around the cemetery, a public school and finally a power station. In 1936 there were 1127 inhabitants.

=== World War II ===
With the shade of the war and the closeness of Cassino, General Kesselring decided to create the Gustav Line, which divided the country into parts. Numerous young men were enlisted in the army and died. Others had to go to the Obligatory Work Service (they were forced to work and unpaid). For example, they had to build fortifications for the German Army. San Biagio Sarasinisco was occupied by the 85th Austrian Regiment and the 10th German Mountain Infantry. The relationship between the inhabitants and the German-speaking occupants was rather peaceful, thanks to a bilingual inhabitant. There were many fights in this territory, thousands of soldiers from all over the world (Africa, Australia, America, Europe) fought on these hills and the surrounding mountains. The whole region was bombarded. The civil population had to be evacuated by trucks a five-day journey to the province of Cremona. On 12 January 1944 at 5:30 am, the 18th Moroccan and the 7th Algerian Regiments attacked in order to enter Sant'Elia Fiumerapido. It became a massacre. On 27 May 1944 at 9 pm the last German soldiers were dislodged by the 41st Parachutists Company of the 184th Regiment. The village was totally destroyed. About 5000 people died in the region. 1946 was the end of the dictatorship, the end of the war and the end of the monarchy of Savoy.

=== Post war ===
The inhabitants found their village in ruins. Everything had to be rebuilt. Little by little San Biagio Sarasinisco rose from its ashes, and was repopulated. In 1961 there were as many people as in 1921. But economic and financial difficulties brought a massive emigration: half of the population moved abroad. Today, although the population is quite low, every year many holiday houses are built for and by the children and grandchildren of these emigrants.

== Economy ==
Farming and breeding are historically the main economic resource of the village. However, today, with the Lake, tourists are more and more numerous. The building of a leisure center on the beach of the lake, of a youth hostel and a restaurant attracts walkers and cyclists. Also the restoration of mountain shelters completes the possibilities.

== Culture ==
=== Dialect ===
With their many invasions and occupations, the inhabitants of speak a dialect learned for generations. It is a mixture of Latin, Italian, French (Napoleon) and Spanish (from 1443 till 1707: Spanish domination of the Aragon family). For example, the consonants are doubled. The consonant v pronounces w. The vowel o is opened. The pronoun "he" pronounces "glie" as in "medaglie". The letter c followed by the vowel e or o or i pronounces "sce" as in "pesce".

=== Pilgrimages ===
On 3 February, the inhabitants celebrate Saint Blaise. Furthermore, in the first Sunday of September, they celebrate the miraculous end of a drought, due to Saint Blase. Finally on 21 August a procession leaves the church of San Biagio at 4 am to go to the Chapel of the Virgin in Canneto. The return takes place the next day around midday.

=== Food ===
On 8 August, in the historic center, is the la Sagra del Frattaccio with dancers and folk music, and ended by fireworks. In 2010, there were 2150 visitors.

== Administration ==
The City Hall is situated at 18 via D.D. Iaconelli. The mayor is Dr. Dario Giustino Iaconelli.
