= Castelfraiano =

Castle in Abruzzo, Italy

Coordinates: 41.8855°N 14.4089°E

- Castiglione Messer Marino
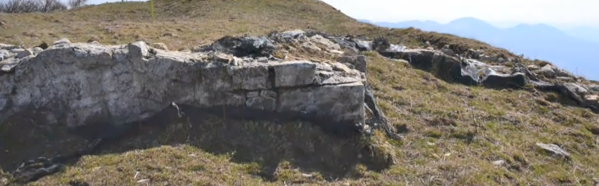
- Castle in Castiglione Messer Marino

Site information
- Type: Castle

Location

Site history
- Built: 12th century

Castelfraiano is a Middle Ages castle located in the Monte Castelfraiano, comune of Castiglione Messer Marino, Province of Chieti (Abruzzo).

== History ==
The original structure dates back to the 12th century, located not far from the convent complex of the Conventual Franciscans situated further down in the area known as Feudo di Lupara, of which only the Church of Santa Maria del Monte remains today. This hilltop fortress dominated the sources of the Sinello and Treste rivers, as well as the access from Monteferrante via the Val di Sangro, although its primary purpose was to monitor the Ateleta-Biferno sheep track that passed through here.

== Architecture ==
Based on an in situ survey, the castle appears to have an enclosure with a scalene trapezoid plan. On the two short sides, there are the remains of a rectangular tower, almost adjacent to the outer walls, and on the opposite side, a rectangular protrusion in the middle position. The castle was 25 meters long and 10 meters deep, with a total area of 250 square meters. A small farmhouse was likely attached to the main structure. Currently, only ruins are visible.
