= Scapoli =

- Comune
- Comune di Scapoli
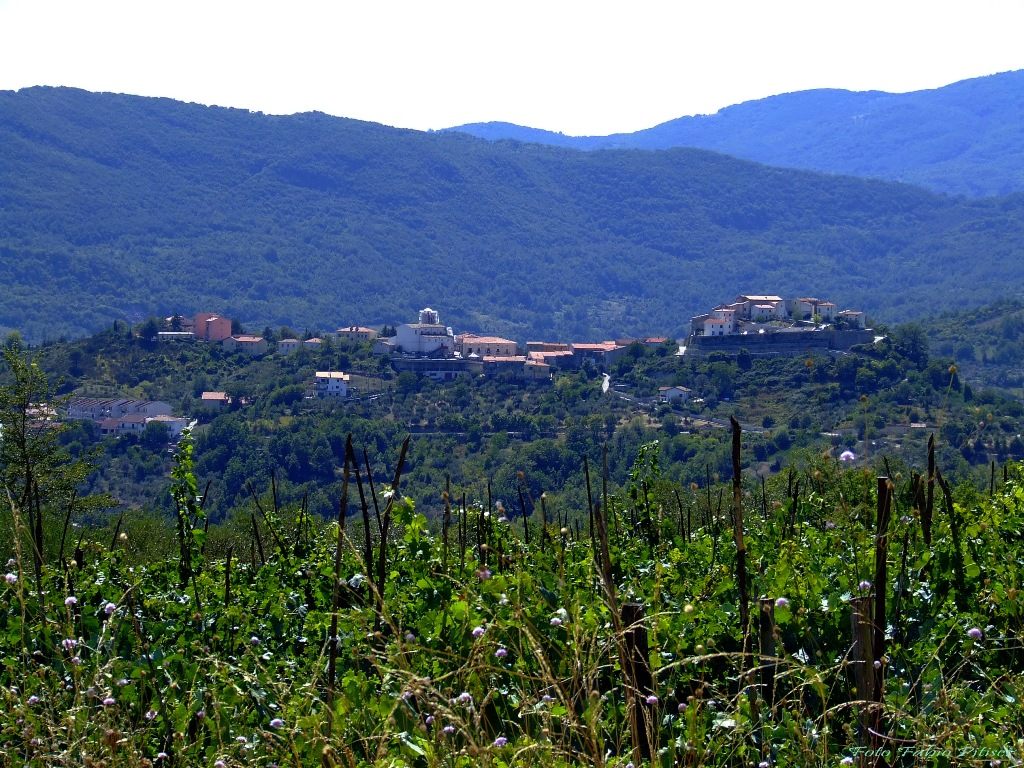
- View of Scapoli

- Coat of arms

- Scapoli within the Province of Isernia

- Location within Italy Location within Molise
- Coordinates: 41°37′N 14°03′E
- Country: Italy
- Region: Molise
- Province: Isernia (IS)
- Frazioni: Acquaviva, Cannine, Cerratino, Collalto, Collematteo, Fontecostanza, Fonte La Villa, Padulo, Pantano, Parrucce, Ponte, Prato, Santa Caterina, Sodalarga, Vaglie, Vicenne

Government
  - Mayor: Renato Sparacino

Area
  - Total: 16 km^{2} (6.2 sq mi)

Population (2011)
  - Total: 758
  - Density: 47/km^{2} (120/sq mi)
- Time zone: UTC+1 (CET)
  - Summer (DST): UTC+2 (CEST)
- Postal code: 86070
- Dialing code: 0865
- Website: Official website

Scapoli is a town and comune located in province of Isernia, which is part of the region of Molise, southern Italy. As of 2011 it had a population of 758.

== Geography ==
Located in the western area of the province, near the region of Lazio, it borders with the municipalities of Colli a Volturno, Filignano and Rocchetta a Volturno. It is connected to the nearby municipality of Vallerotonda (Province of Frosinone, Lazio), by the national road via Cerasuolo, below the Mainarde mountains.

Scapoli counts the hamlets (frazioni) of Acquaviva, Cannine, Cerratino, Collalto, Collematteo, Fontecostanza, Fonte La Villa, Padulo, Pantano, Parrucce, Ponte, Prato, Santa Caterina, Sodalarga, Vaglie and Vicenne.

== Culture ==
It is notable for its bagpipes museum and for the international bagpipe festival which, each year in the month of July, attracts pipers from around the world to come and perform in Scapoli.
