= George Rossi =

Scottish actor (1961–2022)

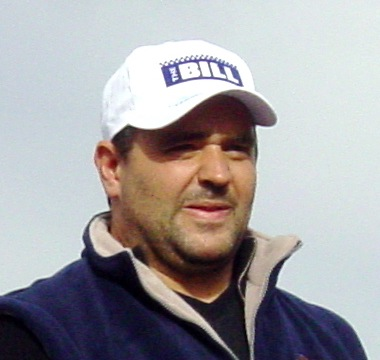
- Born: 28 September 1961; Govan, Glasgow, Lanarkshire, Scotland
- Died: 5 January 2022 (aged 60); London, England
- Education: East 15 Acting School
- Occupation: Actor
- Children: 2

George Rossi (28 September 1961 – 5 January 2022) was a Scottish actor, best known for playing Duncan Lennox in The Bill from 1998 to 2003.

== Early life and education ==
Rossi was born in Govan, Glasgow, on 28 September 1961. He was of Italian descent, with his parents originating from Valvori, a commune of Vallerotonda in Lazio, Italy. Growing up, he worked in the family ice-cream van. His brother, Peter, appeared alongside him in the film Comfort and Joy.

Rossi trained at East 15 Acting School in Debden, Essex.

== Career ==
Besides The Bill, Rossi also played Kevin in Roughnecks and appeared in Taggart, Holby City, Boon, Local Hero, The Singing Detective, and Whitechapel.

== Death ==
On 5 January 2022, Rossi died, aged 60, from pancreatic cancer.

== Filmography ==
Year	Title	Role	Notes
1984	The Chain	Removal man	
1984	Comfort and Joy	Bruno	
1985	Max Headroom: 20 Minutes into the Future	Mahler	Television film
1985	Ties of Blood	Les Hynd	Episode: Invitation to a Party"
1985	Billy the Kid and the Green Baize Vampire		
1986	The Monacled Mutineer		Episode: Before the Shambles"
1986	The Singing Detective	Second Mysterious Man	6 episodes
1987	The Houseman's Tale	Luigi Barclay	
1987	First Sight	Danny Salmon	Episode: "Extras"
1987	Boon	Des	Episode: "Texas Rangers"
1988	Small World	Rodrigo	
1988	A Very British Coup	The Media – Photographer	2 episodes
1989	At the Cafe Continental	Rob	Episode: "Ave Maria"
1989	The Ruth Rendell Mysteries	Pathologist	Episode: "A Sleeping Life: Part 1"; uncredited
1989	4 Play	Main-Ian	Episode: "The Book Liberator"
1990	I Bought a Vampire Motorcycle	Chopper	
1990	The Big Man	Eddie	
1990	Boon	Dilkes	Episode: "Tales from the River Bank"
1991	T. Bag and the Rings of Olympus	Grizzly McMoose	Episode: "The Yukon"
1992	Agatha Christie's Poirot	Zeropoulos	Episode: "Death in the Clouds"
1992	Taggart	Ewan Robb	Episode: "Double Exposure Part 1"
1993	The Bill	Tony	Episode: "Bright Lights"
1993	Casualty	Giovanni Fachetti	Episode: "Out to Lunch"
1994	Staggered	Waiter	
1994–1995	Roughnecks	Kevin	13 episodes
1996	Bugs	Alkmaar	Episode: "Newton's Run"
1996	In Love and War	Triage medic	
1997	The Bill	Jack Gardner	Episode: "Crying Wolf"
1997	Roseanna's Grave	Sgt. Baggio	
1997	Trial & Retribution	Det. Sgt. Donaldson	Episode: "Trial & Retribution I – Part 1"
1997	Thief Takers	Maximo Corona	2 episodes
1997	RPM	Zantos	
1998	Taggart	DI Pete Skinner	Episode: "Berserker Part 1"
1998–2003	The Bill	DC Duncan Lennox	Regular role, 190 episodes
2004	Holby City	Jeff Francis	Episode: "Holding On"
2004	Call Me	Husband	Short film
2006	The Number One Girl	Control Room Producer	Video
2006	Hotel Babylon	Lenny	2 episodes
2006	Ultimate Force	Mejia	Episode: "Charlie Bravo"
2006	Pickles: The Dog Who Won the World Cup	McBrayne	Television film
2006	Respectable	Eddie	Series 1 Episode 6
2006	Wild Romance	Bruce McFadden	
2009–2010	Whitechapel	DC John McCormack	6 episodes
2011	Hustle	Marco	Episode: "The Delivery"
2012	The Hot Potato	Pete	
2012	Sinbad	Akbari's Captain	Episode: "Hunted"
2013	Doctors	Gianpaolo Albertini	Episode: "Floor Routine"
2017	Casualty	Steve Perry	Series 32 Episode 1
2020	Le Cineaste – A Director's Journey	David	
