= Abruzzi e Molise =

Historical region of Italy

Coordinates: 42.35°N 13.4°E

Abruzzi e Molise between 1927 and 1963

Abruzzi e Molise (known as Abruzzi alone when part of the Kingdom of Two Sicilies) is a former region of Italy encompassing a total of 16,600 km^{2} (6,400 sq mi) and corresponding to the territories of Abruzzo, Molise and (until 1927) the Cittaducale District (presently a part of Lazio).

== History ==
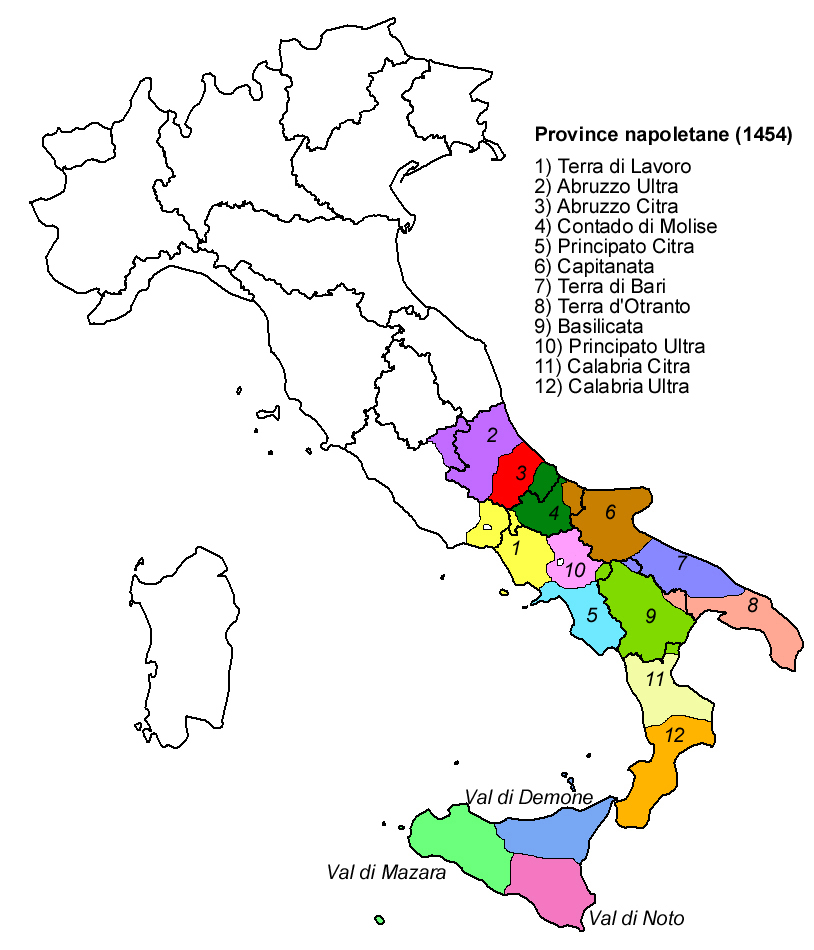
Neapolitan provinces in 1454, showing Contado di Molise (4), Abruzzo Citra (3), and Abruzzo Ultra (2).

From the time of the Kingdom of Naples, this region was considered a single entity with the regional capital at L'Aquila. The name Abruzzo appears to be derivative of the Latin word Aprutium, in turn from the tribe Praetutii. During the Kingdom of Naples, the region was further divided into four provinces: Abruzzo Citra (nearer Abruzzo), Abruzzo Ultra I (farther Abruzzo I), Abruzzo Ultra II (farther Abruzzo II), and Contado di Molise. The Abruzzo provinces were named for their distance from Naples, the capital, and referred to collectively by the plural Abruzzi.

In 1852, the Papal States annexed Ancarano, then further changes occurred during the formation of the Kingdom of Italy including the annexation of Venafro and adjustments of the border with Campania.

In 1927 an additional adjustment was made when the Cittaducale District, comprising Cittaducale and a number of other municipalities, was assigned to Rieti.

== Transformation into separate regions ==
In 1963, the province of Campobasso (which still included the present-day province of Isernia) was split from the region to form Molise, with the remaining four provinces, L'Aquila, Teramo, Pescara and Chieti, comprising the present day Abruzzo.
