= Italian Scots =

Scottish people of Italian descent

Italo-scozzesi (Italian)
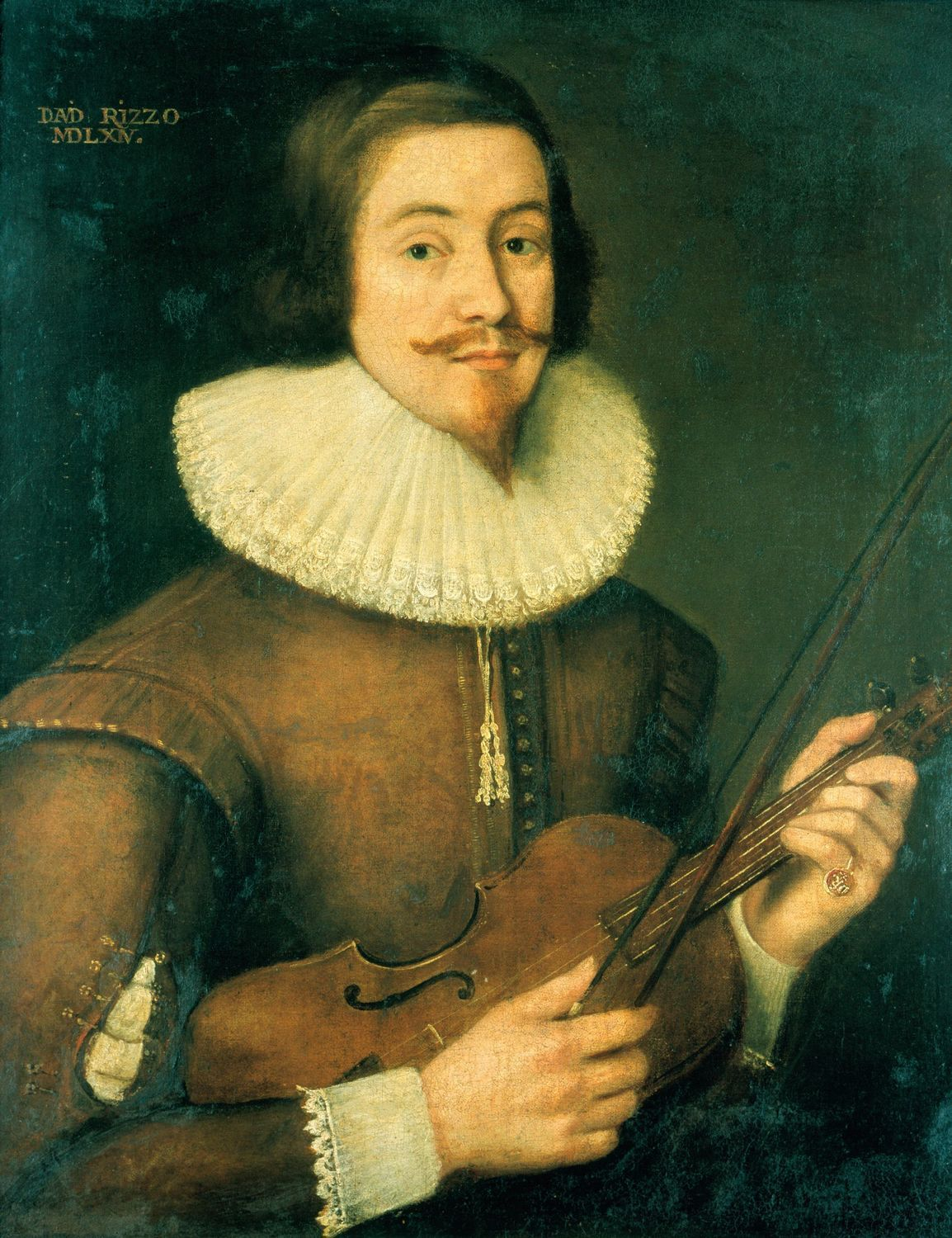
- David Rizzio, who rose to become the private secretary of Mary, Queen of Scots

Total population
- No exact numbers but estimates range from 35,000 to 100,000

Regions with significant populations
- Throughout Scotland specifically Glasgow ·

Languages
- Scots; British English; Italian and Italian dialects

Religion
- Christian: Mostly Roman Catholic

Related ethnic groups
- Italians, Italians in the United Kingdom, Welsh Italians, Scots, Genoese in Gibraltar, Italian Americans, Italian Australians, Italian Canadians, Italian New Zealanders, Italian South Africans

Italian Scots (Italian: italo-scozzesi) are Scottish people of Italian descent. They can either be those whose ancestors emigrated to Scotland or Italian-born people residing in Scotland. This term can also refer to people of mixed Scottish and Italian descent. A recent Italian voter census estimated that there are between 70,000 to 100,000 people in Scotland of Italian descent or having Italian nationality, which is up to 1.9% of the overall Scottish population.

Latest available figures from the 2011 United Kingdom Census show there were 6,048 people born in Italy living in Scotland. This was up from 4,936 in 2001 and 3,947 recorded in 1991. In 2016, Ronnie Convery, secretary of the Italian Scotland charitable organisation and director of communications at the Archdiocese of Glasgow, asserted that a completely new dimension was being added to the Italian Scots community. He said, “There has been a brand new migration over the past two years, and the biggest one we have seen in 100 years."

Migration to Scotland from Italy has been predominantly from the provinces of Lucca and Frosinone. Additional provinces with fairly significant emigration to Scotland include Isernia, La Spezia, Pistoia, Parma, Latina, Massa-Carrara and Pordenone. The Scottish Italian community settled mostly in the Glasgow area, most of whom are of Tuscan origin. The smaller Italian community in and around Edinburgh is predominantly of Lazian origin.

== History ==
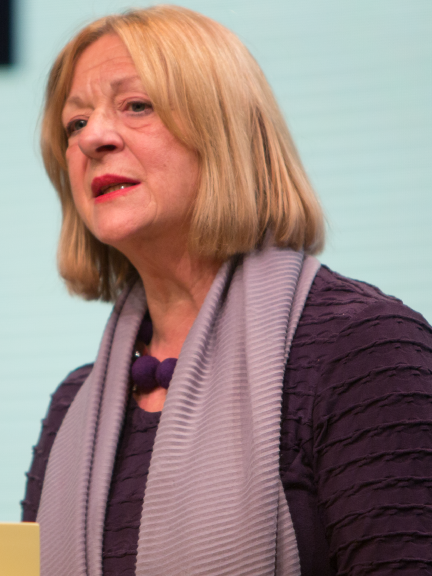
Linda Fabiani, Scottish National Party MSP, and former Minister for Culture

Arguably the first people from Italy to reach Scotland were the Romans in and around 40AD, although the modern nations of Italy and Scotland did not exist at the time, and the Roman Empire was a cosmopolitan institution, with some Roman Emperors from the Iberian Peninsula and North Africa. Still, at least some of the Romans in Scotland were probably from what is now Italy and their constructions in Scotland of the Antonine Wall and other, mostly military installations, provide some insight into the period. No Roman or Romano-Celtic identity appears to have existed in Scotland at this time and it was not until the end of the 19th century that any form of an Italian-Scots identity ever began to take shape.

Many Italian-Scots can trace their ancestry back to the 1890s, when their forefathers escaped drought, famine and poverty in their homeland for a better life in Scotland; yet it was not until World War I that a sizeable population of Italian-Scots—over 4,000—began to emerge, with Glasgow hosting the third largest community in the United Kingdom. Since then, there has been a steady flow of migration between the two countries.

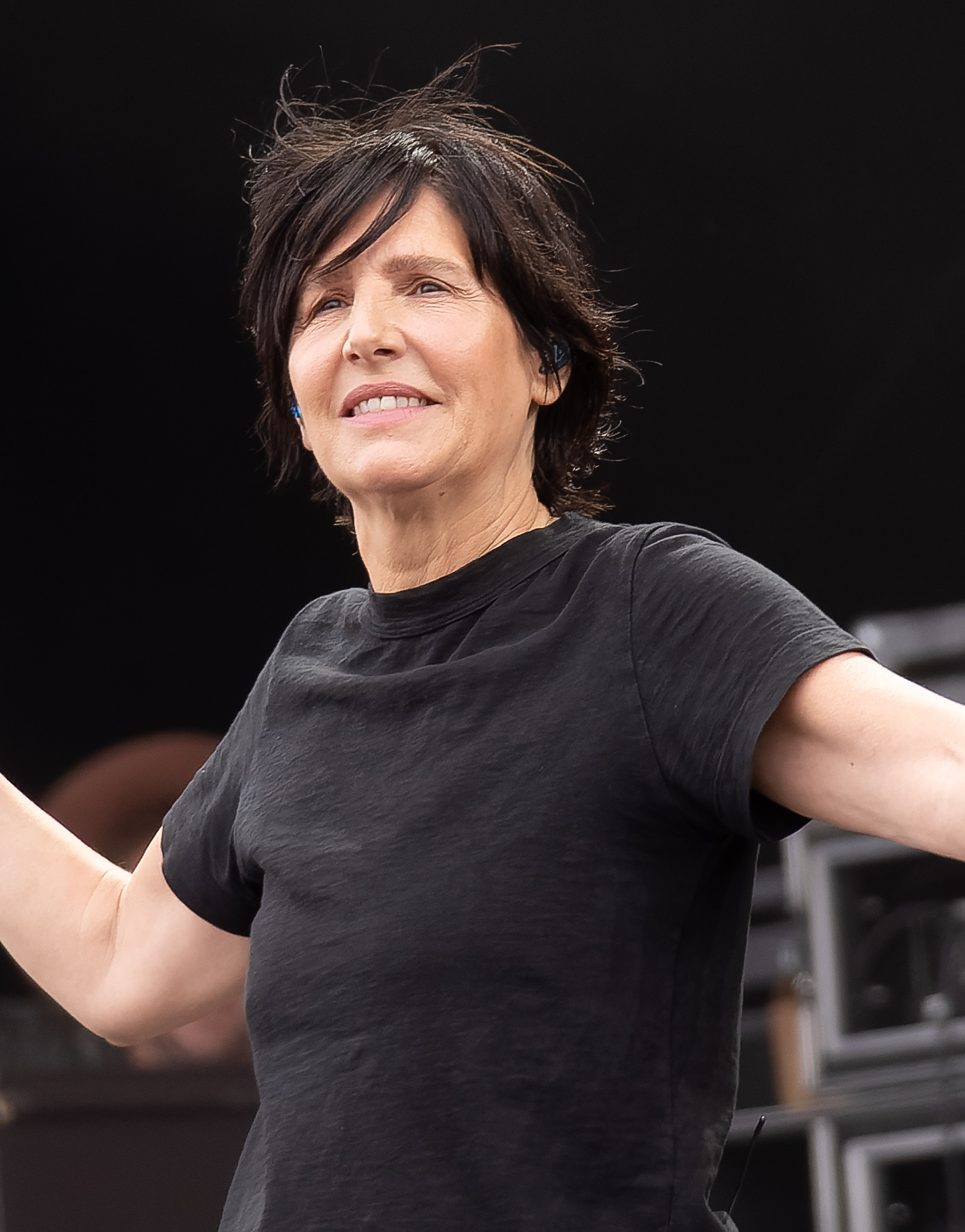
Sharleen Spiteri, singer-songwriter; guitarist; lead vocalist of the Scottish pop-rock band Texas

Italy and the fascist involvement in World War II brought many hardships on Italians settled in Scotland - many families were separated as adult males were interned. The family members that were left behind were forced to cope with mistrust and discrimination. Of those imprisoned many men found themselves held in Northern Ireland and the Isle of Man. A number of others were employed in Orkney, at Scapa Flow, to construct a barrier against Nazi U-boats. These men additionally constructed the Chapel of Lambholm from scrap metal and junk. Nowadays, this Chapel is one of Orkney's most popular tourist attractions.

Today, Italian Scots can be found working in all manner of professions. However, a large proportion of the community have plied their trade in the catering industry, working in the chip shops, ice-cream parlours, pizzerias and restaurants across Scotland.

In Edinburgh, The Italo-Scottish Research Cluster (ISRC) aims to study Italian immigration in Scotland and promote relations between Scotland and Italy.

== Notable Italian Scots ==
- John Amabile, interior designer
- Ronni Ancona, impressionist and actress
- Angus Barbieri, holds the Guinness World Record for the longest recorded fast at 382 days.
- Nicola Benedetti, violinist
- George Biagi, Rugby Player
- Romana D'Annunzio, television presenter
- Junior Campbell, musician and composer
- Gianni Capaldi, actor
- Lewis Capaldi (b. 1996), singer-songwriter and second cousin, once removed of actor Peter Capaldi
- Peter Capaldi (b. 1958), actor and director, best-known for Malcolm Tucker in The Thick of It and the Twelfth Doctor in Doctor Who
- Sergio Casci, screenwriter
- Emilio Coia, caricaturist
- Jack Coia, architect
- Paul Coia, television presenter
- Angela Constance, Scottish National Party MSP
- Mario Joseph Conti, emeritus Archbishop of Glasgow
- Nina Conti, actor, comedian, and ventriloquist
- Tom Conti, actor
- Adrienne Corri, actress
- Simon Danielli, rugby union player
- Nick De Luca, rugby union player
- Richard Demarco, art impresario
- Sophia Dussek, musician
- Paul di Giacomo, footballer
- Linda Fabiani, Scottish National Party MSP, and former Minister for Culture
- Charles Forte, hotelier
- Rocco Forte, hotelier
- Dario Franchitti, Racecar driver
- Marino Franchitti, Racecar driver
- Chris Fusaro, rugby player
- Armando Iannucci, writer and satirist
- Keira Lucchesi, actress
- Lou Macari, footballer and football manager
- Peter Marinello, footballer
- Oscar Marzaroli, photographer
- Dominic Matteo, footballer
- Kirsty Mitchell, actress
- Alberto Morrocco, artist
- Giovanni Moscardini, footballer
- Sir Anton Muscatelli, former Principal and Vice-Chancellor of the University of Glasgow
- Daniela Nardini, actress
- Paolo Nutini, singer-songwriter
- Sir Eduardo Paolozzi, sculptor
- Carmen Pieraccini, actress
- Paul di Resta, Formula 1 racecar driver
- David Rizzio, private secretary of Mary, Queen of Scots
- Marcus Di Rollo, rugby player
- Carla Romano, TV journalist
- George Rossi, actor
- Ricky Sbragia, footballer
- Tom Sermanni, football coach
- Rachel Sermanni, singer-songwriter
- Sharleen Spiteri, singer-songwriter; guitarist; lead vocalist of the Scottish pop-rock band Texas
- Ken Stott, actor
- Philip Tartaglia, Archbishop of Glasgow
- Alexander Trocchi, writer
- Peter Vettese, musician
- Charles Edward Stuart, Prince
- Lena Zavaroni, singer

== In popular culture ==
- American Cousins – A film about an Italian Scots family and their Mafia associated American cousins.
- Strictly Sinatra
- Comfort and Joy – A film about a war between rival Italian ice cream companies in Glasgow. The film is a spoof of American gangster movies.
- Soft Top Hard Shoulder

== See also ==
- Italian migration to Britain
- Immigration to the United Kingdom
- Italian diaspora
- Italians in the United Kingdom
- Welsh Italians
- Genoese in Gibraltar
- List of British Italians
- Italian Scot communities of Filignano, Barga,Cerasuolo and Gurro even though Gurro's connection to Scotland is linked to a legend rather than recent immigration.
