= Cerasuolo, Molise =

Cerasuolo
- Frazione
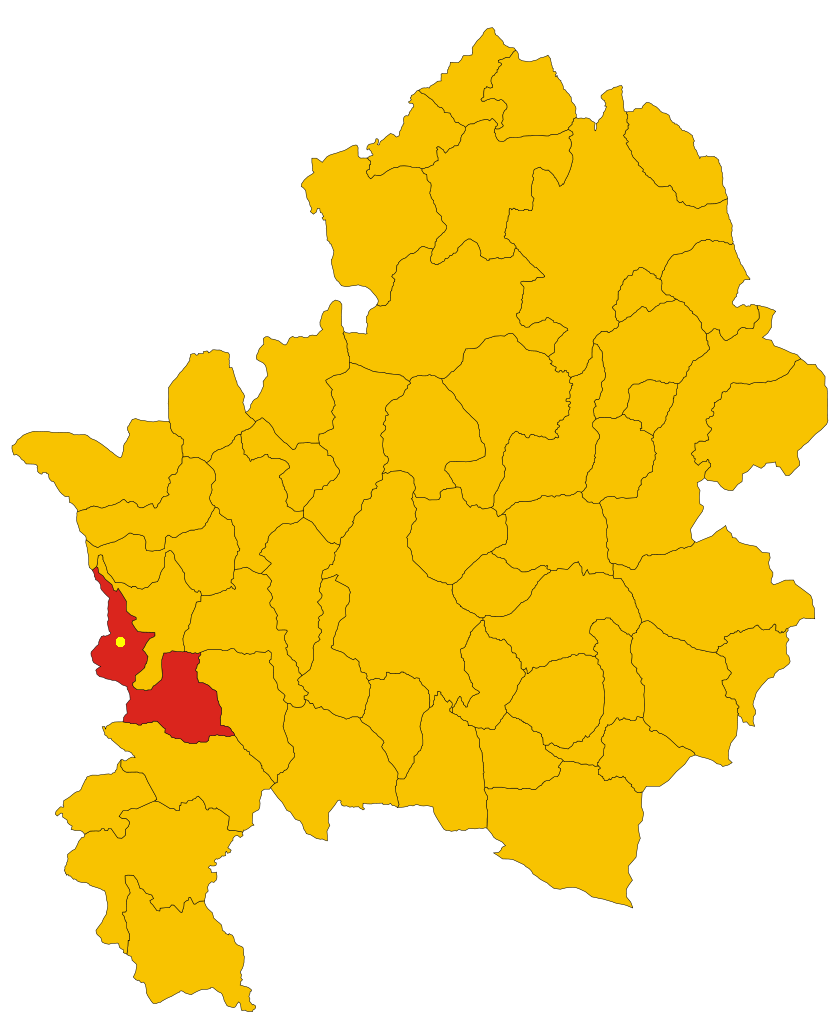
- Cerasuolo (yellow dot) shown within the municipality of Filignano (dark red) and the Province of Isernia

- Location of Cerasuolo in Italy
- Coordinates: 41°35′6.6″N 14°01′13.24″E
- Country: Italy
- Region: Molise
- Province: Isernia (IS)
- Comune: Filignano
- Elevation: 678 m (2,224 ft)

Population (2009)
  - Total: 151
- Demonym: Cerasolani
- Time zone: UTC+1 (CET)
  - Summer (DST): UTC+2 (CEST)
- Postal code: 86074
- Dialing code: 0865
- Patron saint: St. Paschal Baylon
- Saint day: 2 August

Cerasuolo is an Italian village, the most populated hamlet (frazione) of Filignano, a municipality in the province of Isernia, Molise. As of 2009 its population was of 151.

== History ==
During the 20th Century, the municipal population of Filignano has been decreasing due to emigration in Northern Italy and in the United Kingdom. Cerasuolo is, among the 13 municipal villages, the most populated by a community of Italian Scots, children and grandchildren of Filignanese immigrants, returning from Scotland. An event that celebrates this cultural link is, for example, the annual "Scottish Festival Fish & Chips".

== Geography ==
Located at circa 1 km from the borders of Molise with the Province of Frosinone, Lazio, Cerasuolo is the only hamlet within the northern branch of its municipality. It is a hill villages below the Mainarde mountains, close to the Abruzzo, Lazio and Molise National Park.

The village is 4 km far from Cardito, 8 from Filignano and 19 from Venafro. It is crossed in the middle by a provincial road and close to the national highway SS 627 Sora-Isernia. Nearby the SS 627, linking the village to Scapoli (14 km), San Biagio Saracinisco (12 km), and Vallerotonda (17 km), there are the medieval ruins of Cerasuolo Vecchio (i.e. "Old Cerasuolo").

== See also ==
- Monti della Meta
