= County of Molise =

Coat of arms

The County of Molise (Italian: Contado di Molise) was a giustizierato (justiciarate) in the Kingdom of Sicily and Kingdom of Naples.

Originally it covered a small area between the Mainarde mountains and the Matese mountains, where the province of Isernia is today. During the Middle Ages its borders reached the Adriatic coast up to Vasto. When the Kingdom of Two Sicilies was established Contado di Molise had a surface area as large as contemporary Molise.
