= Cerasuolo =

Cerasuolo (Italian, lit. 'cherry red') may refer to:

- Cerasuolo, Molise, a village in the Molise region of Italy
- Cerasuolo di Vittoria, a DOCG red wine from Sicily, Italy
- Cerasuolo d'Abruzzo, a DOC rosato (rosé) wine from Abruzzo, Italy
- Cerasuolo, the Italian term for precious coral, species of the Corallium genus
- Maddalena Cerasuolo (1920–1999), Italian antifascist partisan
