= Mikio Hasemoto =

United States Army Medal of Honor recipient

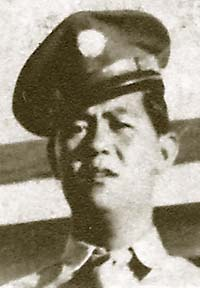
- Pvt. Mikio Hasemoto
- Born: July 13, 1916; Honolulu, Hawaii
- Died: November 29, 1943 (aged 27); Cerasuolo, Italy
- Burial place: National Cemetery of the Pacific, Hawaii
- Military career
- Allegiance: United States of America
- Branch: United States Army
- Service years: 1941 - 1943
- Rank: Private
- Unit: 100th Infantry Battalion
- Conflicts: World War II
- Awards: Medal of Honor; Purple Heart

Mikio Hasemoto (Japanese: 長谷本 幹夫, July 13, 1916 – November 29, 1943) was a soldier in United States Army. He is best known as a recipient of the Medal of Honor in World War II during actions in Cerasuolo, Italy.

== Early life ==
Hasemoto was born at Honolulu, Hawaii. He is the son of immigrants who were born in Japan. He is a Nisei, which means that he is a second-generation Japanese American.

== Soldier ==
Hasemoto joined the Army from Schofield Barracks, Hawaii in June 1941. Hasemoto volunteered to be part of the all-Nisei 100th Infantry Battalion. This army unit was mostly made up of Japanese Americans from Hawaii.

He was killed while repelling an attack against numerically superior German forces. For his actions in November 1943, he was initially awarded the Distinguished Service Cross. This was eventually upgraded to the Medal of Honor upon military review on June 21, 2000.

== Medal of Honor citation ==
Hasemoto, Mikio
Rank and organization:Private, U.S. Army, Company B, 100th Infantry Battalion (Separate)
Place and date:Cerasuolo, Italy, November 29, 1943
Entered service at:Schofield Barracks, Hawaii
Born:July 13, 1916, Honolulu, Hawaii
Citation:

Private Mikio Hasemoto distinguished himself by extraordinary heroism in action on 29 November 1943, in the vicinity of Cerasuolo, Italy. A force of approximately 40 enemy soldiers, armed with machine guns, machine pistols, rifles, and grenades, attacked the left flank of his platoon. Two enemy soldiers with machine guns advanced forward, firing their weapons. Private Hasemoto, an automatic rifleman, challenged these two machine gunners. After firing four magazines at the approaching enemy, his weapon was shot and damaged. Unhesitatingly, he ran 10 yards to the rear, secured another automatic rifle and continued to fire until his weapon jammed. At this point, Private Hasemoto and his squad leader had killed approximately 20 enemy soldiers. Again, Private Hasemoto ran through a barrage of enemy machine gun fire to pick up an M-1 rifle. Continuing their fire, Private Hasemoto and his squad leader killed 10 more enemy soldiers. With only three enemy soldiers left, he and his squad leader charged courageously forward, killing one, wounding one, and capturing another. The following day, Private Hasemoto continued to repel enemy attacks until he was killed by enemy fire. Private Hasemoto's extraordinary heroism and devotion to duty are in keeping with the highest traditions of military service and reflect great credit on him, his unit, and the United States Army.

== Awards and decorations ==

Badge	Combat Infantryman Badge		
1st row	Medal of Honor		Bronze Star Medal
2nd row	Purple Heart	Army Good Conduct Medal	American Defense Service Medal
3rd row	American Campaign Medal	European–African–Middle Eastern Campaign Medal with 1 campaign star	World War II Victory Medal

== See also ==
- List of Medal of Honor recipients
- List of Medal of Honor recipients for World War II
- 442nd Regimental Combat Team
