= Pizzone, Molise =

Pizzone Pizzóne
- Comune
- Comune di Pizzone
- Coat of arms

- Location of the village of Pizzone within the province of Isernia

- Location within Italy Location within Molise
- Coordinates: 41°40′N 14°2′E
- Country: Italy
- Region: Molise
- Province: Isernia (IS)
- Frazioni: Ara Antica, Aramerdiara, Ommaro, Pagliarone

Government
  - Mayor: Spini

Area
  - Total: 33.49 km^{2} (12.93 sq mi)
- Elevation: 730 m (2,400 ft)

Population (1 January 2021)
  - Total: 307
  - Density: 9.17/km^{2} (23.7/sq mi)
- Demonym: Pizzonesi
- Time zone: UTC+1 (CET)
  - Summer (DST): UTC+2 (CEST)
- Postal code: 86076
- Dialing code: 0865
- Patron saint: Saint Liberata
- Saint day: June 10
- Website: Official website

Pizzone is a comune (municipality) in the Province of Isernia in the Italian region Molise, about 50 kilometres (31 mi) west of Campobasso and about 20 kilometres (12 mi) northwest of Isernia near the Monti della Meta chain.

== History ==
The area around Pizzone has been inhabited since the Neolithic period, as proved by a series of lithic artifacts discovered in their respective state and currently held in a museum of Campobasso.

The rocky area around Pizzone was part of a thoroughfare that ran through the Mainardi mountains. During the Samnite period this area linked the commercial and military touti separated by the mountains. The road, reaching S. Vito di Colli, Cerro, and crossing the path of S. Francesco, came up to Aufidena, now Alfedena. The road was certainly used by the Roman military during the Samnite Wars of the fourth century BC.

The first mention of Pizzone appears in the Volturnense Chronicle. A few decades after the destruction at the hand of the Arab invasions of 881 AD, and at the time of the reconstruction of the Abbey of San Vincenzo al Volturno, the lord of the area decided to start populating the area between 935 and 981 with settlers from the land of the Marsi. The villages of Jannini, Roccasecca, Cerquacupa, and Viscurri were created from this; some of their ruins still remain.

Charles II of Anjou granted Pizzone autonomy from the jurisdiction of the Abbey by a decree of 13 October 1295 and the village was assigned as a fief to Andrea of Isernia. After the death of Andrea in 1316, Pizzonia (earlier Latin Piczotum) was incorporated into Abruzzo Citra (now the Province of Chieti), as shown by Regesti Angevin in 1320. In 1383 the monks had to sell more land around the Castrum Piczoni in order to restore the abbey.

According to various sources, the feudal overlords of Pizzone were the Leoness family in the first half of the 14th century, while in the later half the Caldora family took over. Between the 15th and 16th centuries, it became a fief of Pando, who already lorded Venafro, and was later possessed by the Marquis de Bucchis; in 1777 it passed on to Domenico Cestari and finally to the Marquis Pietro Battiloro.

Feudalism was abolished in 1809, after which Pizzone became an autonomous comune. By a decree of 17 February 1861 Pizzone became incorporated into the Region of Molise and later with the creation of the National Park of Abruzzo in 1929.

Saint Nicholas, celebrated on 6 December, is the patron saint of Pizzone, while on 10 June the feast of Saint Liberata is celebrated, featuring a famous statue of her crucified.

== See also ==
- Monte Meta
