= Filignano =

- Comune
- Comune di Filignano
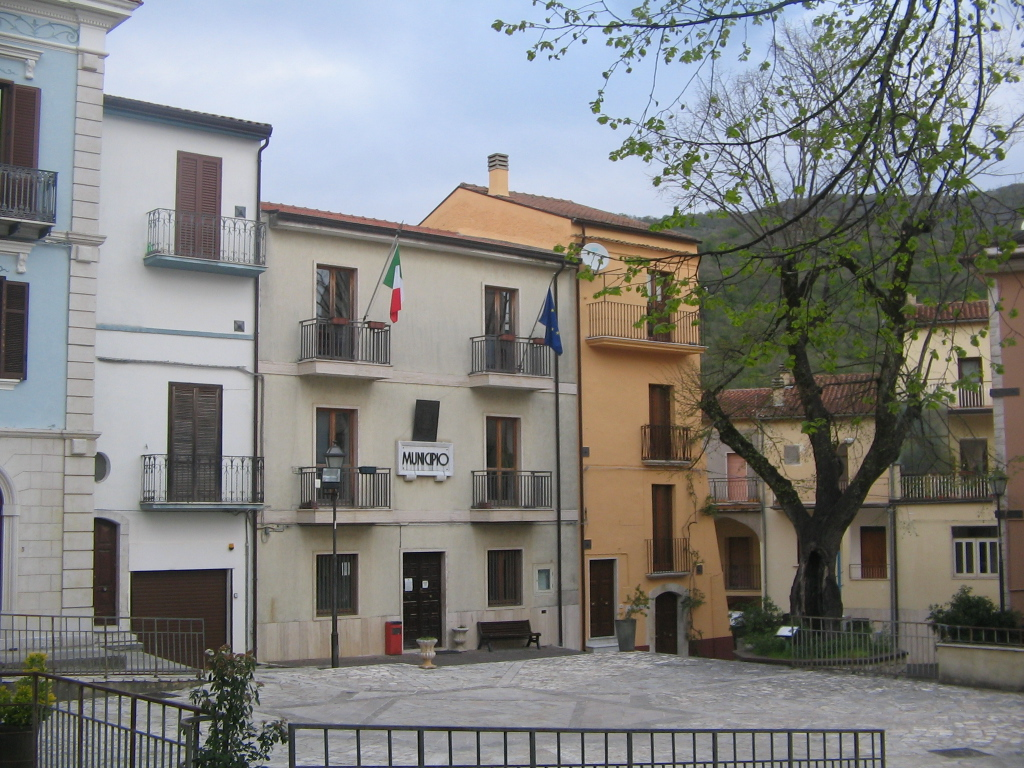
- Town hall and church square

- Filignano within the Province of Isernia

- Location within Italy Location within Molise
- Coordinates: 41°32′42.94″N 14°3′23.9″E
- Country: Italy
- Region: Molise
- Province: Isernia (IS)
- Frazioni: Bottazzella, Cerasuolo, Cerreto, Collemacchia, Franchitti, Frunzo, Lagoni, Mastrogiovanni, Mennella, Selvone, Valerio, Valle

Government
  - Mayor: Federica Cocozza

Area
  - Total: 30.88 km^{2} (11.92 sq mi)
- Elevation: 460 m (1,510 ft)

Population (31 December 2017)
  - Total: 647
  - Density: 21.0/km^{2} (54.3/sq mi)
- Demonym: Filignanesi
- Time zone: UTC+1 (CET)
  - Summer (DST): UTC+2 (CEST)
- Postal code: 86074
- Dialing code: 0865
- Website: Official website

Filignano is an Italian comune (municipality) of the Province of Isernia, in the region Molise.

== History ==
The village was first mentioned in 962 and elevated to autonomous municipality in 1840, when it was separated from Pozzilli.

== Geography ==
Filignano is located 74 kilometres (46 mi) west of Campobasso, 24 kilometres (15 mi) southwest of Isernia, 11 kilometres (6.8 mi) north of Venafro, and 34 kilometres (21 mi) east of Cassino. It is a hill town surrounded by the Mainarde mountain range, in the Abruzzo, Lazio and Molise National Park.

The municipal territory, bordering with the region of Lazio and not too far from Campania, borders with the municipalities of Acquafondata (FR), Colli a Volturno, Montaquila, Pozzilli, Rocchetta a Volturno, Scapoli, and Vallerotonda (FR). It counts the hamlets (frazioni) of Bottazzella, Cerasuolo, Cerreto, Collemacchia, Franchitti, Frunzo, Lagoni, Mastrogiovanni, Mennella, Selvone, Valerio, and Valle.

In the municipality there is a small community of Italian Scots, children and grandchildren of Filignanese immigrants, returning from Scotland.

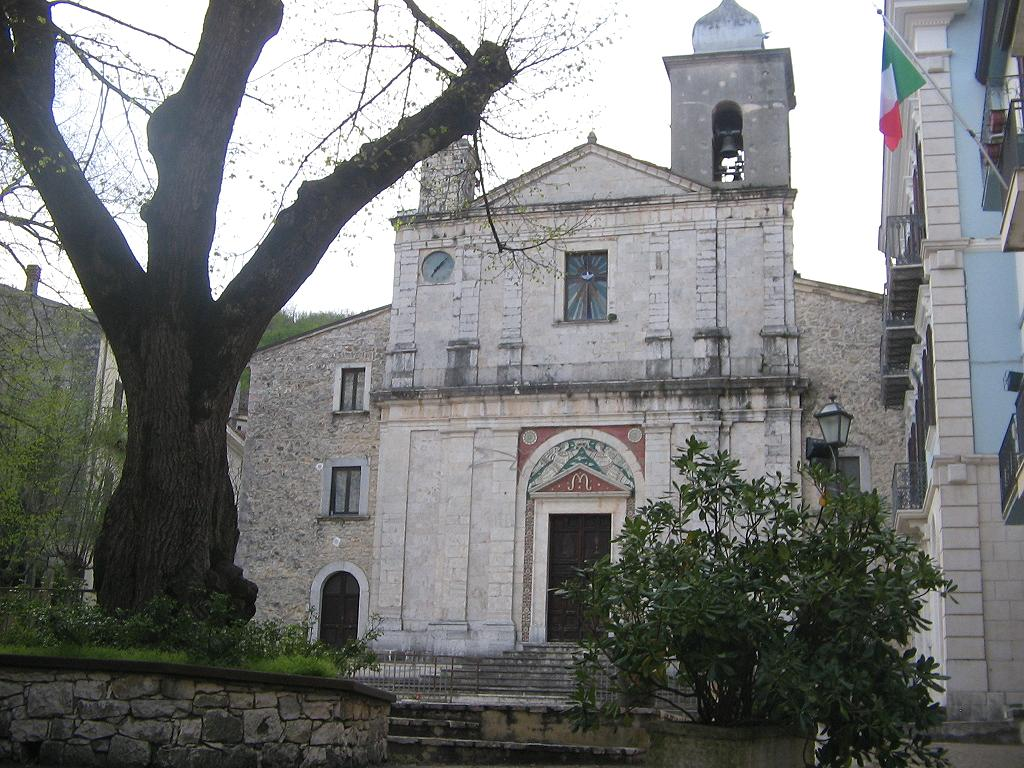
The central church of the Immaculate Conception, at Piazza Municipio aside the town hall.

== People ==
- Mario Lanza (1921-1959), Italian-American tenor and actor. Lanza's father was originally from Filignano. The town hosts a Mario Lanza festival every August.
