= Castiglione Messer Marino =

Castiglione Messer Marino Lu Cuaštegliàune (Neapolitan)
- Comune
- Comune di Castiglione Messer Marino
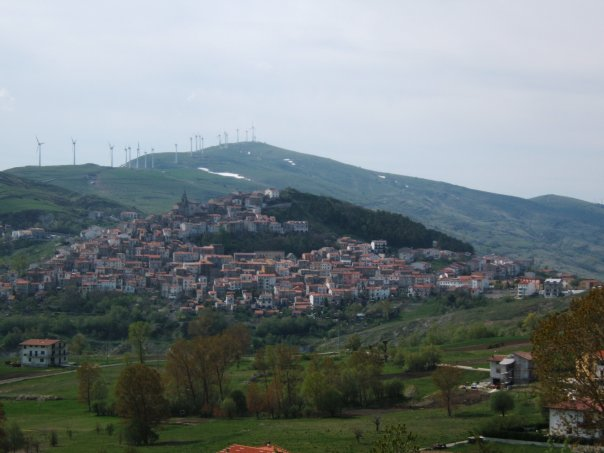

- Location within Italy Location within Abruzzo
- Coordinates: 41°52′N 14°27′E
- Country: Italy
- Region: Abruzzo
- Province: Chieti (CH)
- Frazioni: Colle Trimarino, Padulo, Sant'Egidio, LOpòl

Government
  - Mayor: Felice Magnacca

Area
  - Total: 47.99 km^{2} (18.53 sq mi)
- Elevation: 1,081 m (3,547 ft)

Population (31 March 2017)
  - Total: 1,745
  - Density: 36.36/km^{2} (94.18/sq mi)
- Demonym: Castiglionesi
- Time zone: UTC+1 (CET)
  - Summer (DST): UTC+2 (CEST)
- Postal code: 66033
- Dialing code: 0873
- Patron saint: St. Raphael
- Saint day: 11 September
- Website: Official website

Castiglione Messer Marino (locally Lu Cuaštegliàune [lu kwaʃtəʝˈʝɔwnə]) is a comune and town in the province of Chieti in the Abruzzo region of central-eastern Italy.

It is the birthplace of race car driver Juan Manuel Fangio's father, Loreto Fangio.

== See also ==
- Castelfraiano
- Monte Castelfraiano
