= Museo civico aufidenate Antonio De Nino =

Coordinates: 41.7352°N 14.0310°E

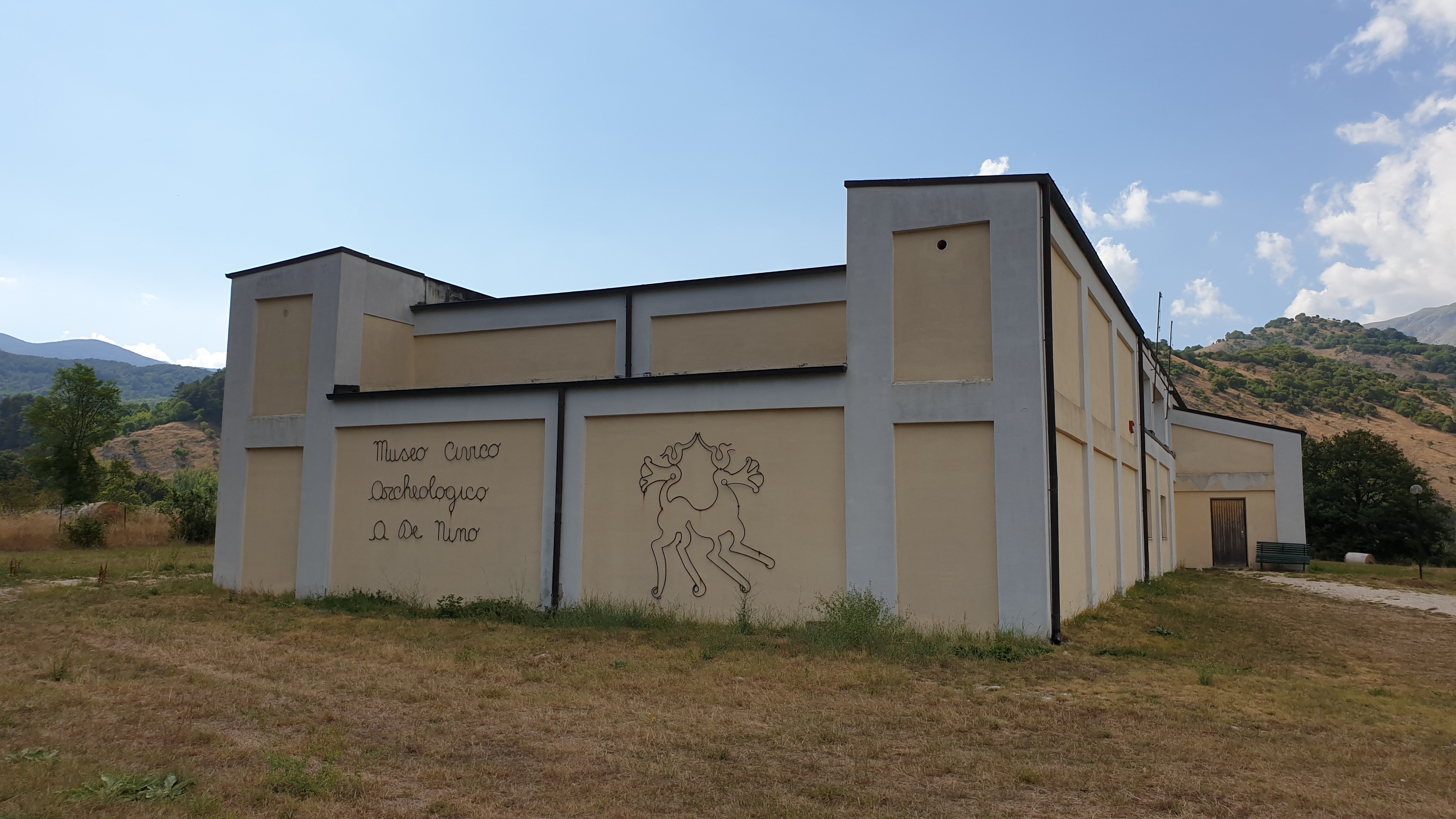
- Location: Alfedena
- Type: Archaeology museum

Museo civico aufidenate Antonio De Nino (Italian for Antonio De Nino Aufidena Civic Museum) is an archaeology museum in Alfedena, Abruzzo.

== History ==
The museum was founded in 1897 to collect artefacts found during excavations of the Samnite necropolis of Alfedena-Campo Consolino. Excavation campaigns at the end of the 19th century, first held by Antonio De Nino and then by Lucio Mariani, found tombs dating from the 6th to 4th century BC. Finds of particular interest are a bronze belt, a Samnite three-disc cuirass and two kardiophylakes.

== Collection ==
The exhibition features funerary artifacts unearthed during the excavations. Of particular interest are a three-disk breastplate, a pair of kardiophylax, and a bronze belt.
