= Museo della Zampogna =

Museum in Italy

Coordinates: 41.6162°N 14.0578°E

Museo della Zampogna (Bagpipe Museum)
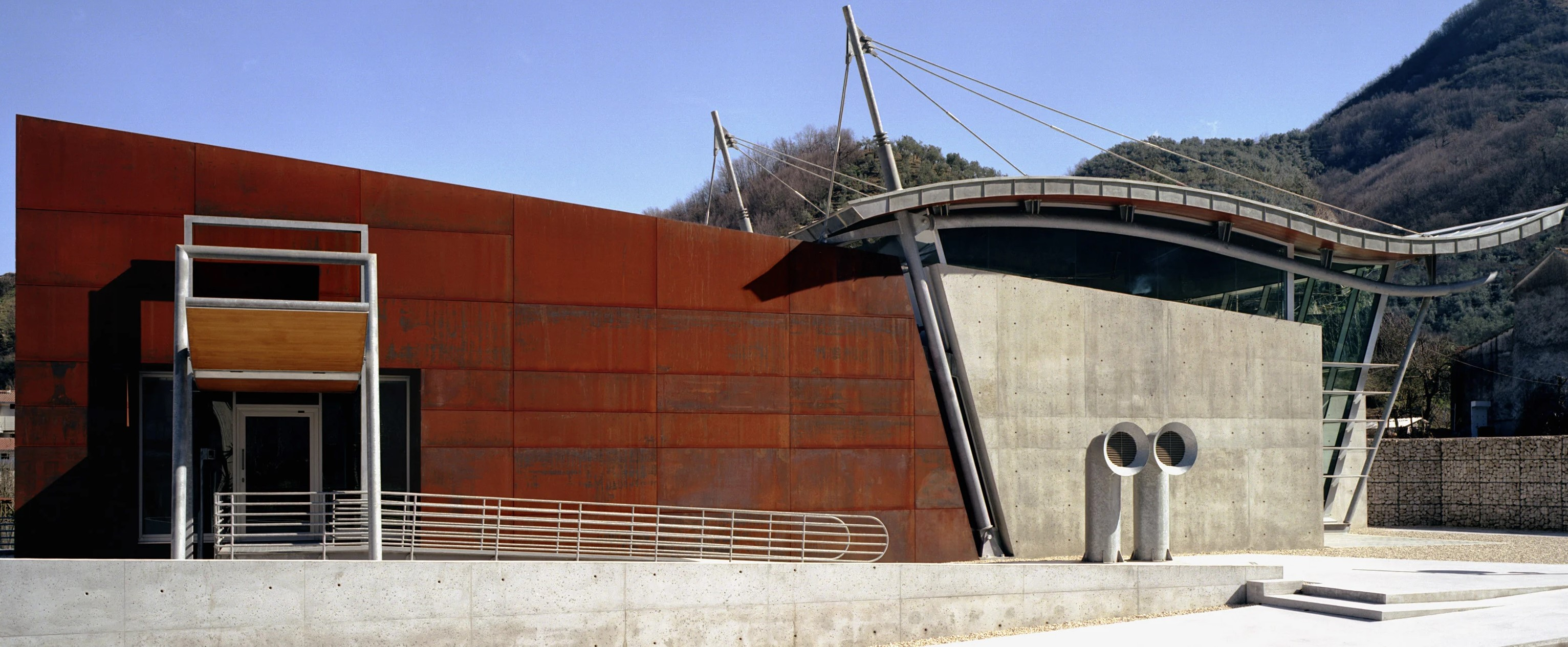
- Location: Scapoli, Italy
- Type: Art museum, Historic site
- Website: benvenutiascapoli.it/il-museo-della-zampogna

The Museo della Zampogna (Bagpipe Museum) is located in Scapoli, Italy. The museum has a permanent exhibit of a variety of Italian bagpipes as well as bagpipes from other countries.

== See also ==
- List of music museums

== Sources ==
- Paola Pandiani. I luoghi della musica. Touring Editore, 2003. ISBN 88-365-2810-4, ISBN 978-88-365-2810-3
