= Melfa =

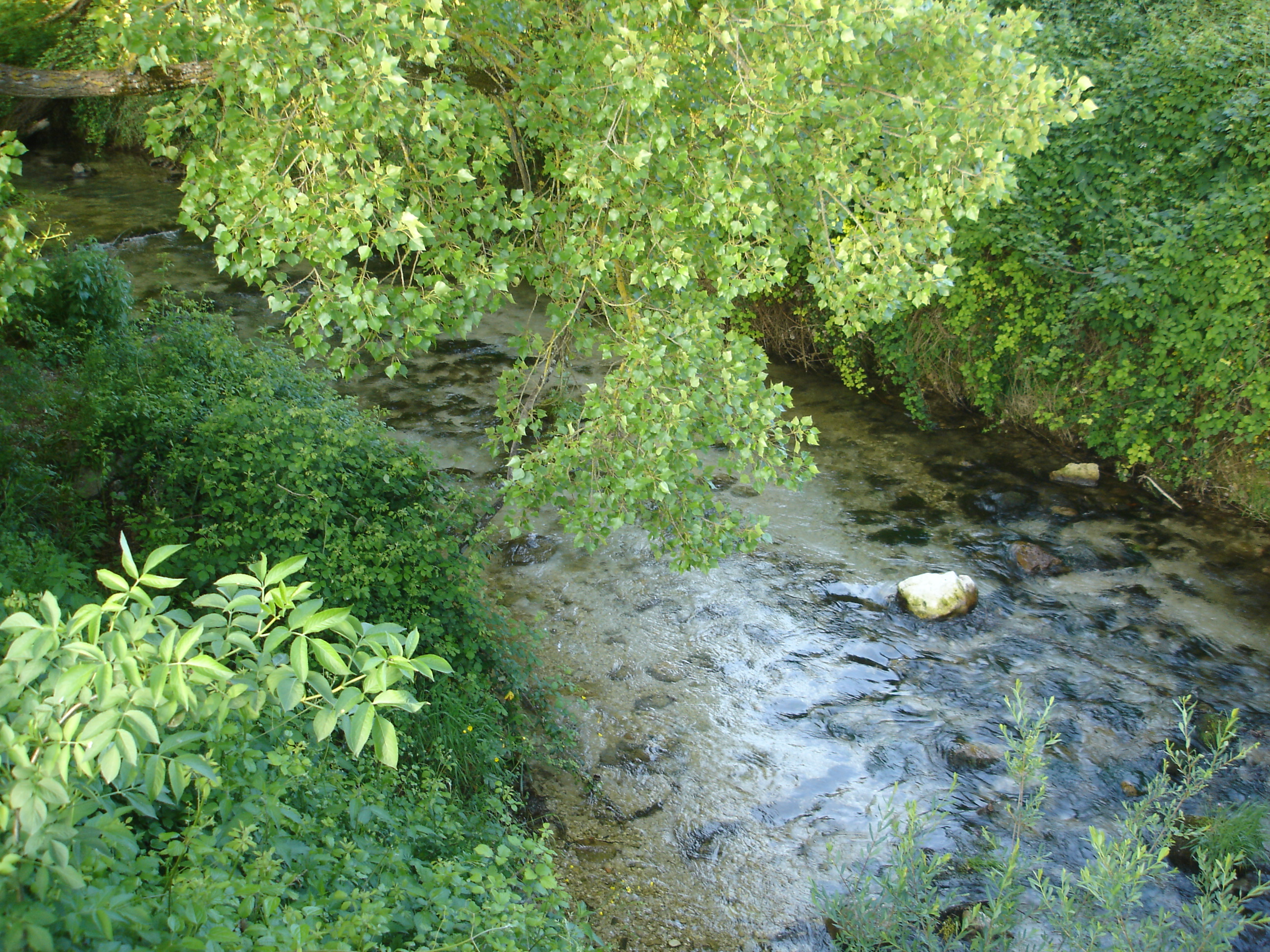
- The Melfa near Picinisco

Physical characteristics
- Source
  - location: Madonna di Canneto, Settefrati
  - elevation: 1,020 m (3,350 ft)
- Mouth: Liri
  - coordinates: 41.500°N 13.594°E
- Length: 40 km (25 mi)

Basin features
- Progression: Liri→ Garigliano→ Tyrrhenian Sea

The Melfa is a river in Lazio, Italy. It rises in the Monti della Meta, flows south-west for about 40 kilometres (25 mi) and joins the Liri near San Giovanni Incarico.

The source of the Melfa issues from a high limestone chimney in the Valle di Canneto at an elevation of 1,020 metres (3,350 ft) in the Lazio watershed of the Parco Nazionale d'Abruzzo, Lazio e Molise beneath the Massiccio del Meta, in the territory of Settefrati. The source has been linked in local legend and popular devotion since Antiquity. In a series of rapids and cascades, it descends the Valle di Comino, passing through Picinisco, Atina— where it receives the waters of the little Mollarino— Casalattico and Casalvieri. Below Casalvieri it passes for 15 km through a deep gorge in the foothills of Monte Cairo at the end of which it reaches the Liri, near Roccasecca.

The Melfa is noted by Strabo as a "large river" flowing near the city of Aquinum/Aquino. The origin of the name is obscure, perhaps to be associated with the goddess Mefitis, worshipped in a sanctuary uncovered in 1958 at the place called Capodaqua, right below the source. Other toponyms from the same root include the locality Melfi a Pontecorvo, also near the Liri, seat of an ancient cult of John the Baptist; the city of Melfi and Molfetta, anciently Melficta; Melpum in the central Paduan plain, perhaps also Amalfi; in Lucania the hydronym Melpes is found.
