= Alfedena =

- Comune
- Comune di Alfedena
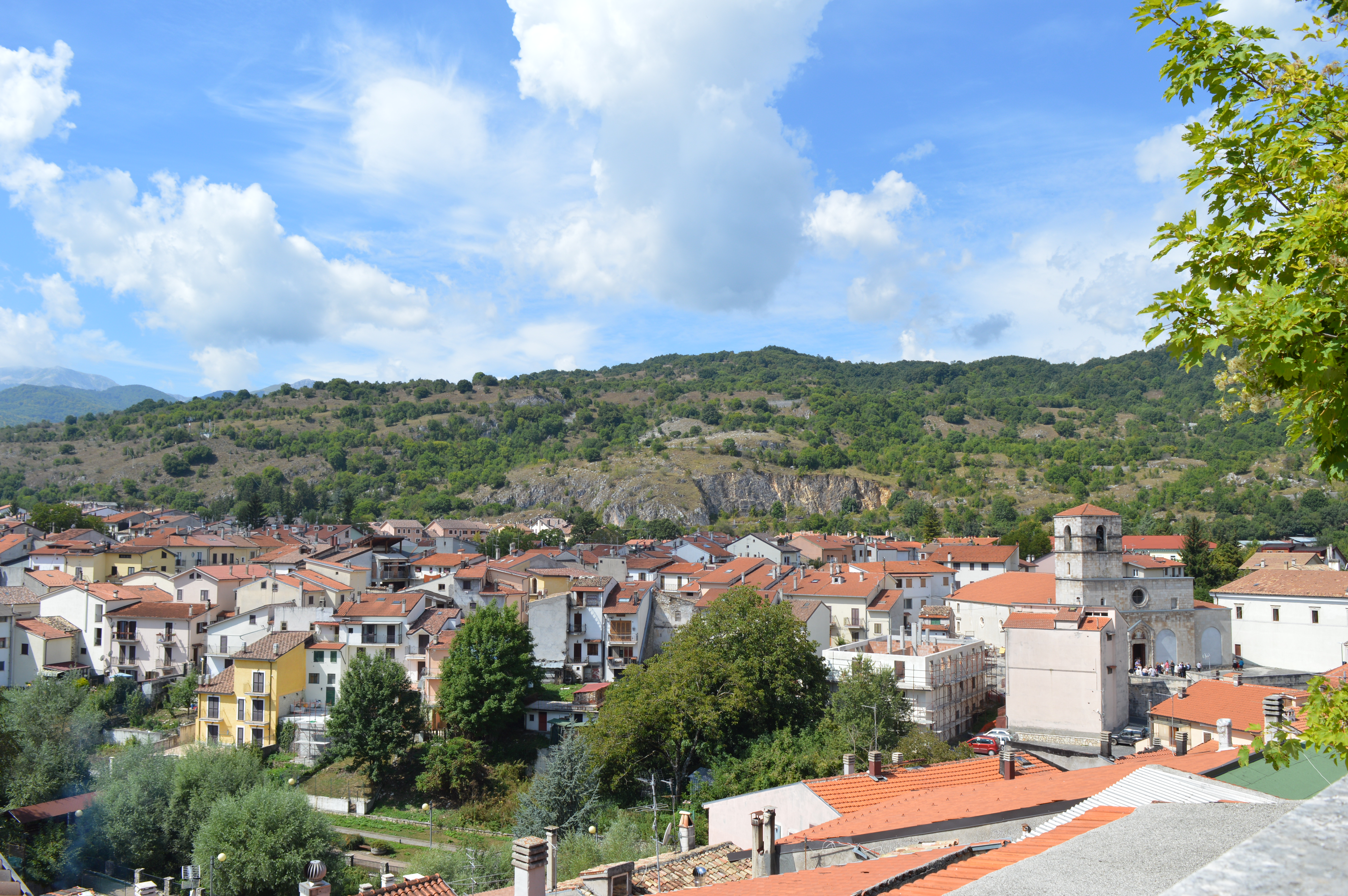

- Location within Italy Location within Abruzzo
- Coordinates: 41°44′14″N 14°2′22″E
- Country: Italy
- Region: Abruzzo
- Province: L'Aquila (AQ)

Government
  - Mayor: Massimo Scura

Area
  - Total: 40 km^{2} (15 sq mi)
- Elevation: 914 m (2,999 ft)

Population (30 April 2017)
  - Total: 880
  - Density: 22/km^{2} (57/sq mi)
- Demonym: Alfedenesi
- Time zone: UTC+1 (CET)
  - Summer (DST): UTC+2 (CEST)
- Postal code: 67030
- Dialing code: 0864
- Patron saint: St. Peter Martyr
- Saint day: April 29
- Website: Official website

Alfedena (Latin: Aufidena or Aufidenia, Abruzzese: Fëdena) is a comune in the province of L'Aquila of the Abruzzo region of central Italy. It is located in the Abruzzo, Lazio and Molise National Park in the upper Sangro valley, near the Monti della Meta mountain chain.

== History ==
Alfedena was founded by the Samnites, who called it Aufidena, because of its excellent strategic view over the high Sangro valley. It occupied two hills, both over 3,800 feet (1,200 m) above sea-level; in the valley between were found the supposed remains of the later forum. Alfedena was the setting of several conflicts through its history because of this location. It was a district of the Samnites before it was the capital town of the Caraceni tribe during their first settlement near the high Saro, the ancient name of today’s Sangro river. Alfedena was then conquered by the Romans in 298 BC, and by the Lombards during the 11th century.

== Main sights ==
Many works of art, such as the Ponte Achille (Achille’s bridge), dating back to the Roman age, were destroyed by the German armed forces during the defence of the Gustav Line, in World War II. The Germans took away, as spoils, many ruins of the Italic necropolis of Campo Consolino located below the village, which counted 1400 tombs on a total amount of 12,000 tombs. Part of the stolen archeological finds were returned after an accurate restoration at the University of Tübingen. The archaeological excavations bear witness to the ancient presence in the area and to its historically autonomous civilization. They tombs are all true burials, of the late Iron Age, and date from the 7th to the 4th century BC, falling into three classes—those without coffin, those with a coffin formed of stone slabs, and those with a coffin formed of tiles.

Some ruins of walls built in polygonal masonry (also referred to as cyclopean masonry) can also be seen in the districts of Civitalta, Curino, and S. Nicola, with some columns and ruins of a temple brought to life by excavations. The village boasts an ancient tradition in the crafts of stone carving. The last craftsmen made the artistic paving of the town unique to its genre. In the historical center, people can admire the octagonal castle of the Simone’s feud, Count of Sangro.

== See also ==
- Monte Meta

== See also ==
- Museo civico aufidenate Antonio De Nino
