= Monti delle Mainarde =

Mountain range in Italy

Highest point
- Peak: Monte Cavallo
- Elevation: 2,039 m (6,690 ft)
- Coordinates: 41°39′N 13°58′E

Geography
- Country: Italy
- Region(s): Lazio, Molise

Geology
- Rock type: limestone

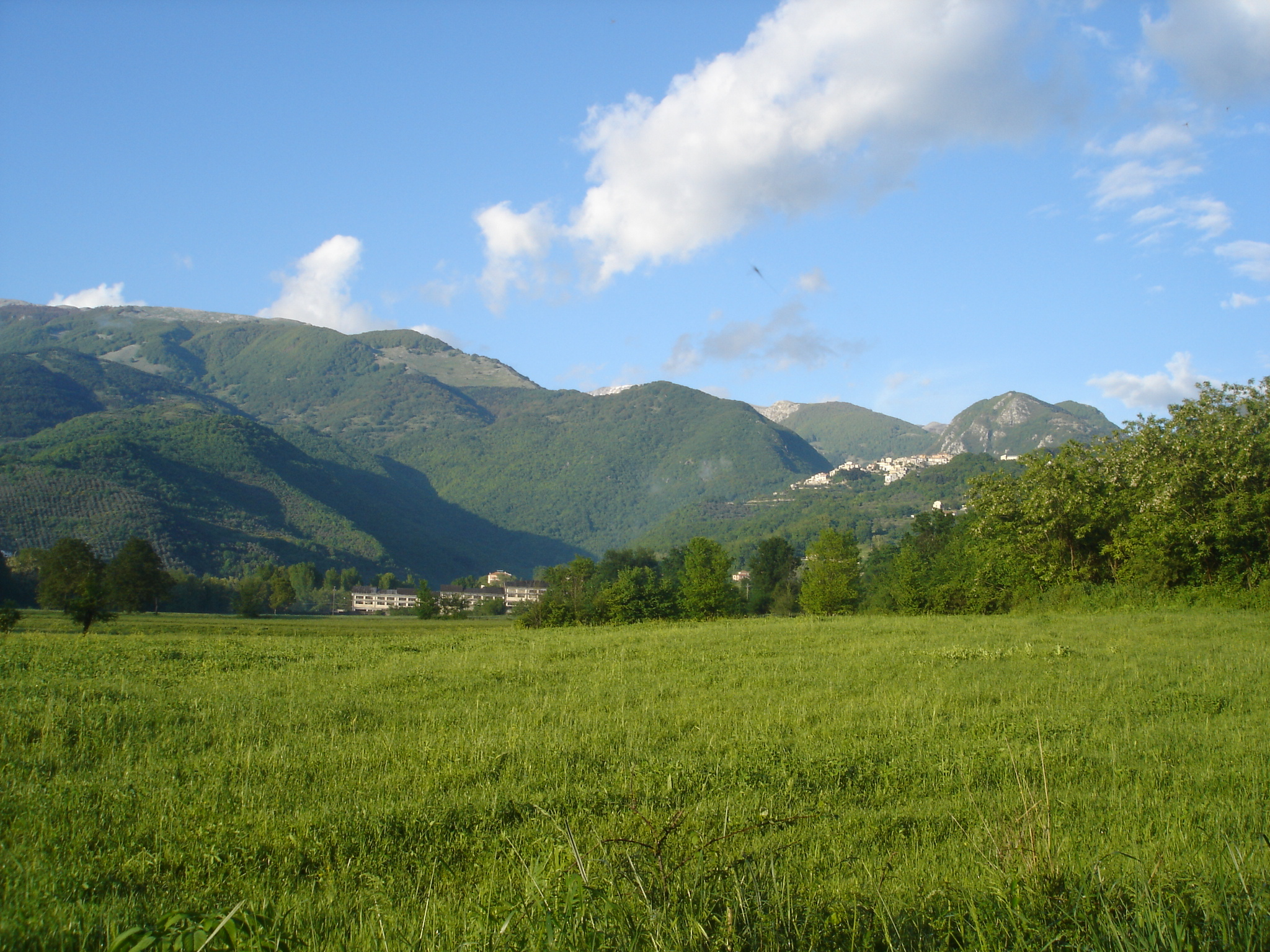

The Monti delle Mainarde, also known just as Le Mainarde, is a range of calcareous mountains on the border between the regions of Lazio and Molise in southern central Italy. It is the southern extension of the Monti della Meta. The highest peak is Monte Cavallo, at 2039 m. Tributaries of the Melfa flow to the south-west from its western flanks, and tributaries of the Volturno to the south-east from its eastern side. Most of the range lies within the Parco Nazionale d'Abruzzo.

== See also ==
- Monte Castelfraiano
