= Artins =

- Commune
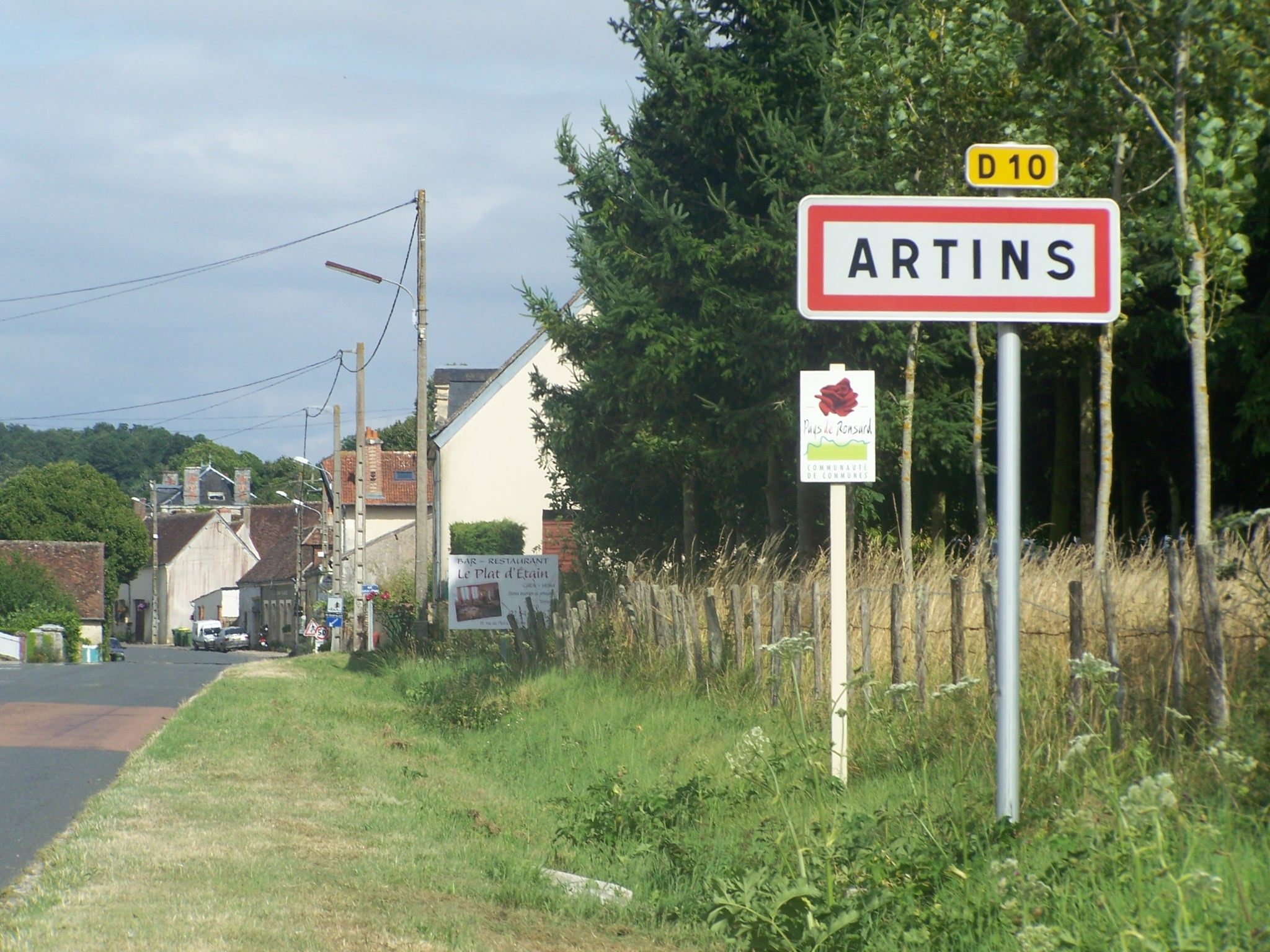
- The road into Artins

- Coat of arms
- Location of Artins
- Location within France Location within Centre-Val de Loire
- Coordinates: 47°44′45″N 0°44′27″E
- Country: France
- Region: Centre-Val de Loire
- Department: Loir-et-Cher
- Arrondissement: Vendôme
- Canton: Montoire-sur-le-Loir
- Intercommunality: CA Territoires Vendômois

Government
  - Mayor (2020–2026): Patrick Huguet
- Area^{1}: 11.72 km^{2} (4.53 sq mi)
- Elevation: 80 m (260 ft)
- Highest elevation: 139 m (456 ft)
- Lowest elevation: 57 m (187 ft)
- Population (2023): 266
  - Density: 22.7/km^{2} (58.8/sq mi)
- Time zone: UTC+01:00 (CET)
  - Summer (DST): UTC+02:00 (CEST)
- INSEE/Postal code: 41004 /41800
- ^{1} French Land Register data, which excludes lakes, ponds, glaciers > 1 km^{2} (0.386 sq mi or 247 acres) and river estuaries.

Artins (French pronunciation: [aʁtɛ̃]) is a commune in the Loir-et-Cher department in central France.

== Population ==
Historical population
Year	Pop.	±% p.a.
1968	317	—
1975	265	−2.53%
1982	272	+0.37%
1990	247	−1.20%
1999	282	+1.48%
2007	285	+0.13%
2012	288	+0.21%
2017	264	−1.73%
2023	266	+0.13%
Source: INSEE

== History ==
The name derives from the Gallo-Roman Artinis.

The historic Romanesque church, dedicated to Saint Julien (of Le Mans), at a ford in the Loir river, fell into ruins when development occurred nearer a departmental route at a site known as Le Plat d'Etain. It has since been restored by local initiative for cultural purposes.

Popular tradition would have it that Artins is older than Le Mans (the ecclesiastical centre of the diocese to which Artins formerly belonged) and that St. Julien evinced a dragon who had taken up residence in a temple (which was replaced by the former church). A pilgrimage celebrating this feat survived into the mid-twentieth century.

The hillside is marked by a former Commanderie and the manor of Rocheturpin (which lost its Romanesque chapel in the late nineteenth century). Just below these and above the Plat d'Etain is the present neo-gothic church. The lower hillside is marked by a series of caves often used as wine-cellars.

== See also ==
- Communes of the Loir-et-Cher department
