= Valvori =

Human settlement in Italy

- Village
- Interactive map of Valvori
- Coordinates: 41°33′N 13°53′E
- Country: Italy
- Region: Lazio
- Province: Frosinone
- Municipality: Vallerotonda
- Elevation: 400 m (1,300 ft)

Population
  - Total: 700
- Demonym: Migalet
- Website: www.valvori.com

Valvori is a small village that is a part of Vallerotonda, a town and comune (municipality) in southern Lazio in Italy. The village, which is located in the Apennine Mountains, is 3 kilometres (1.9 mi) away from the town of Vallerotonda and forms part of the Comino Valley. This area is historically tied to the Campania region in Southern Italy, and was only in the 1920s transferred to region of Lazio.
