= Monte Meta =

Mountain in Italy

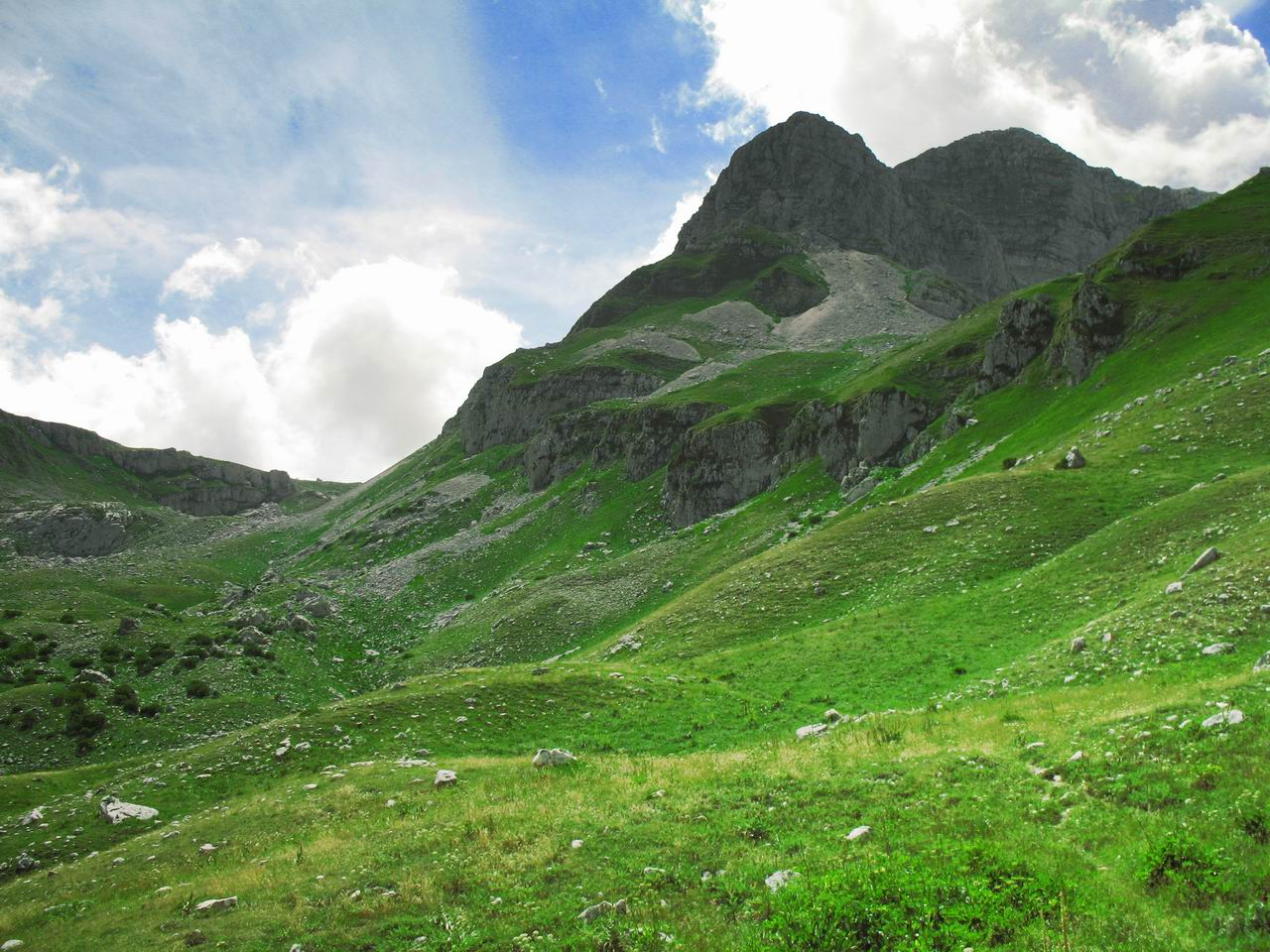
- View from Valle Pagana

Highest point
- Elevation: 2,241 m (7,352 ft)
- Prominence: 211 m (692 ft)
- Isolation: 4.6 km (2.9 mi)
- Coordinates: 41°41′19.68″N 13°56′23.35″E

Geography
- Location within Italy
- Location: Molise, Lazio, Abruzzo - Italy
- Parent range: Monti della Meta

Climbing
- Easiest route: Hike

Monte Meta (or simply La Meta) is a mountain of the Apennine Mountains, in Southern Italy.

== Geography ==
The mountain is part of the Monti della Meta range and lies in the Parco Nazionale d'Abruzzo, Lazio e Molise. It includes a tripoint where the Italian regions of Lazio, Abruzzo and Molise meet; concerned comuni are Alfedena (AQ), Picinisco (FR) and Pizzone (IS). The tripoint is located on its western sub-summit, at 2185 m, which is also the highest point of Molise.

== Toponymy ==
More than Monte Meta (masculine) the mountain is usually called in the spoken language la Meta (feminine); it gives the name to the Monti della Meta, an Apennine sub-range.

== Access to the summit ==
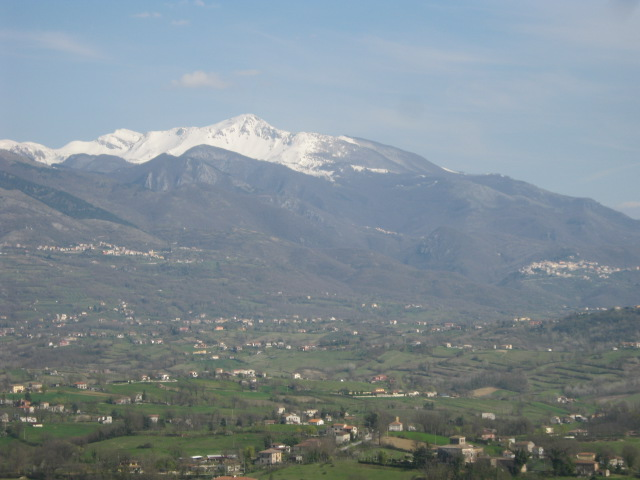
La Meta covered with snow (march)

Due to an important population of Rupicapra pyrenaica ssp. ornata living on the mountain, the access to the area is strictly regulated in order to reduce disturbance. A single footpath (named L1) is accessible to hikers during the summer. Also the days of the week for hikes and the number of hikers admitted per day are fixed, and a previous authorization must be requested to the natural park administration.

== See also ==
- List of Italian regions by highest point
