= Abruzzo Citra =

Province of the Kingdom of Naples

Coordinates: 42°10′N 14°20′E

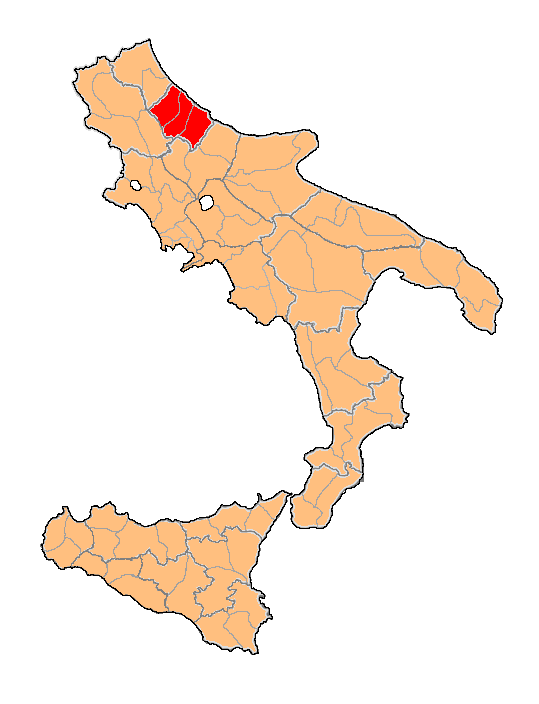
Provincia Abruzzo Citeriore

Abruzzo Citra or Abruzzo Citeriore was a province of the Kingdom of Naples established by Charles of Anjou when he divided Giustizierato of Abruzzo (founded by Frederick II) into two parts: Ultra flumen Aprutium Piscariae (Aprutium beyond the Pescara) and Aprutium citra flumen Piscariae (Aprutium this side of the Pescara).

== Geography ==
Abruzzo Citra was located south of the Pescara river and within the area of today's Abruzzo region of Italy, and for the most part within the present Province of Chieti; the seat was the city of Chieti.

Today the term citra is associated with table wines produced in this region of Abruzzo and exported overseas.

== Composition ==
The province comprised 3 districts:

- District of Chieti, established in 1806
- District of Lanciano, established in 1806
- District of Vasto, established in 1816

Each district was divided into 25 circumdari, each comprising 123 communes and 34 villages.

== Bibliography ==
- Gabriello De Sanctis, ed. (1840). Dizionario statistico de' paesi del regno delle Due Sicilie. Napoli.
- Pompilio Petitti, ed. (1851). Repertorio amministrativo ossia collezione di leggi, decreti, reali rescritti ecc. sull'amministrazione civile del Regno delle Due Sicilie, vol. 1. Napoli: Stabilimento Migliaccio.

== See also ==
- Justiciarate

== Sources ==
- it:Abruzzo Citra
