= Atessa Val di Sangro SSD =

Italian football club

Atessa Val di Sangro
- Full name: Atessa Val di Sangro Associazione Sportiva Dilettantistica 2012
- Nickname(s): Sangrini
- Founded: 2009; 2012 (refounded)
- Ground: Stadio Montemarcone, Atessa, Italy
- Capacity: 2,000
- Chairman: Angelo Staniscia
- Manager: Enzo D'Ortona
- League: Allievi Regionali Abruzzo/B
- 2011–12: Serie D/F, 12th
Home colours	Away colours

Atessa Val di Sangro A.S.D. 2012 is an Italian association football club from Atessa, Abruzzo. It currently plays only in the youth sector: the main team is that of Allievi Regionali Abruzzo in the group B.

== History ==
The former Atessa Val di Sangro S.S.D. was founded in 2009 after the merger with Polisportiva Val di Sangro and Atessa Calcio.

In summer 2012 it does not join in Serie D and was excluded from all the Italian football.

Immediately after the club was refounded as Atessa Val di Sangro A.S.D. 2012 that currently plays only in the youth sector.

=== Before the merger ===
==== Polisportiva Val di Sangro ====

The club was founded in 1961 as Libertas Monte Marcone and so renamed in 1968.

In the 2005–06 season, Polisportiva Val di Sangro finished first in Serie D, Girone F. Notably, Val di Sangro was the first Serie D team, that season, to gain promotion, mathematically clinching its division five matches before the end of the season.

Since 2006–07, Val di Sangro has been playing in Serie C2 and played at that level (renamed to Lega Pro Seconda Divisione in 2008) until 2009, when the club was relegated to Serie D.

==== Atessa Calcio ====
The club was founded in 1964.

Since the season 2004–05 until the merger the club has played in Eccellenza Abruzzo.

== Colors and badge ==
The colors of the team are yellow and blue.
