= Justiciarate =

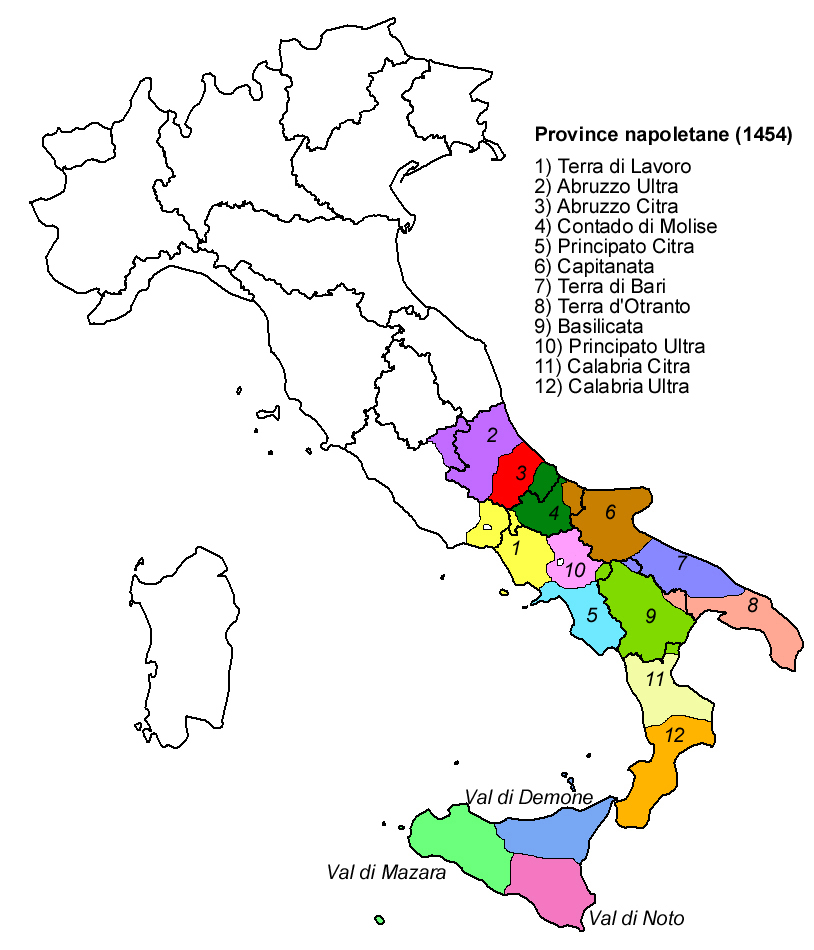
Neapolitan justiciarates in 1454

A justiciarate or justiciarship (Italian: giustizierato [dʒustittsjeˈraːto], plural giustizierati; alternatively known as circoscrizione) was a type of administrative subdivision that was used by several Italian states in the medieval period.

The Kingdom of Sicily under Frederick II used giustizierati to divide his realms in the 1230s: Abruzzo, Basilicata, Calabria, Capitanata, Principato e Terra Beneventana, Terra di Bari, Terra di Lavoro (including the modern Frosinone and Latina provinces of today's Lazio region), Terra d'Otranto and Valle di Crati e Terra Giordana.

Under Carlo I of Anjou in the 1270s, the subdivision of Abruzzo was considered too large an area to defend and manage efficiently, especially since it was the most northern part of the kingdom. It was decided to follow the border created by the river of Pescara, creating two separate giustizierati of Abruzzo Ulteriore and Abruzzo Citeriore.

The era of giustizierati ended in the time when the Spanish power of Aragon came to power in the Kingdom of Sicily when these giustizierati were just simply called province (plural of provincia "province").
