= Vallerotonda =

- Comune
- Comune di Vallerotonda
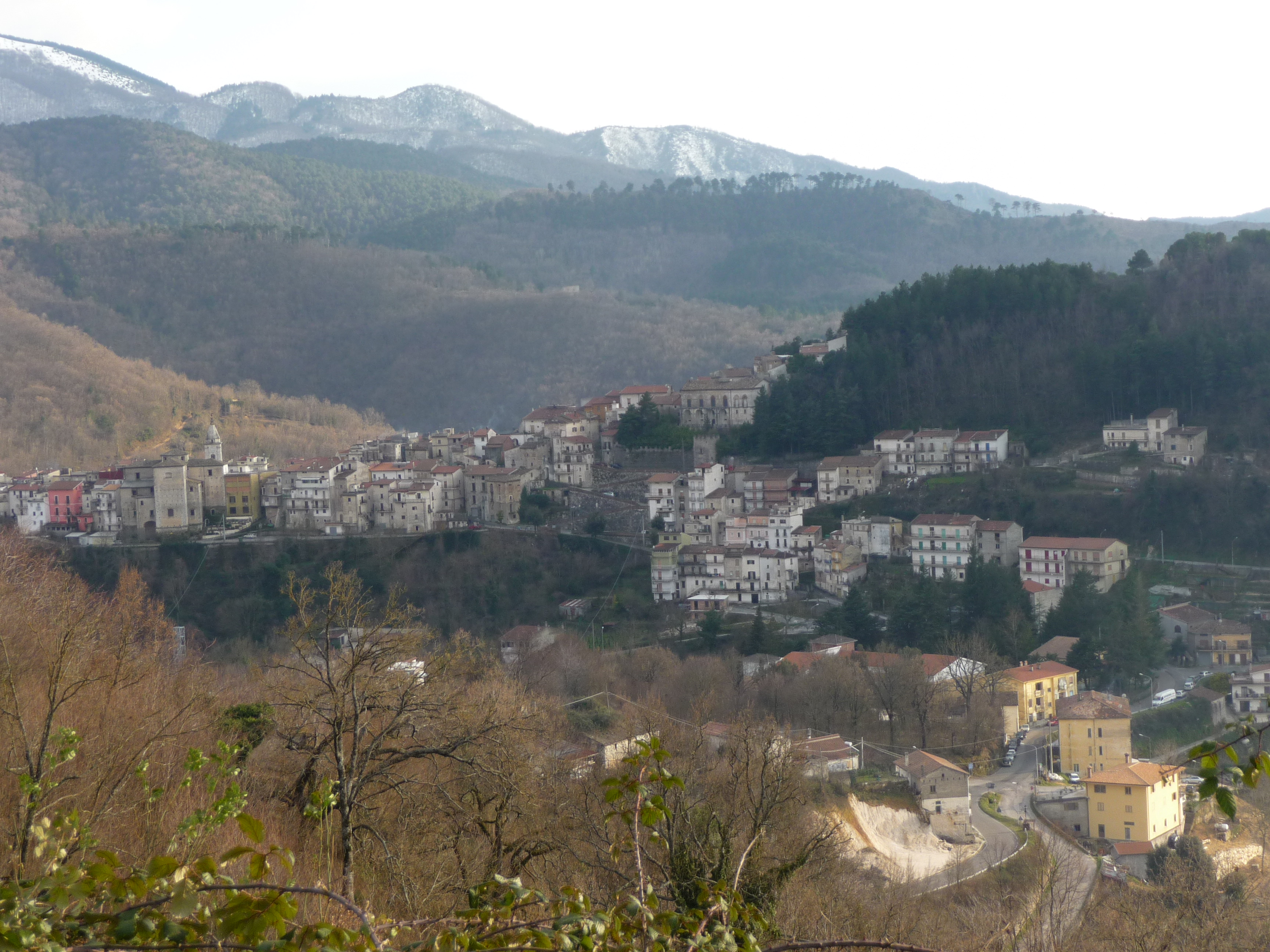
- View of Vallerotonda

- Coat of arms

- Location within Italy Location within Lazio
- Coordinates: 41°33′N 13°55′E
- Country: Italy
- Region: Lazio
- Province: Frosinone (FR)
- Frazioni: Centro, Valvori, Cerreto and Cardito.

Government
  - Mayor: Gianfranco Verallo

Area
  - Total: 59 km^{2} (23 sq mi)
- Elevation: 620 m (2,030 ft)

Population (28 February 2017)
  - Total: 1,539
  - Density: 26/km^{2} (68/sq mi)
- Demonym: Vallerotondesi
- Time zone: UTC+1 (CET)
  - Summer (DST): UTC+2 (CEST)
- Postal code: 03040
- Dialing code: 0776
- Patron saint: St. Peter
- Saint day: 7 April
- Website: Official website

Vallerotonda (locally Vardónna) is a town and comune (municipality) in the region of Lazio in central Italy, in the province of Frosinone. The commune is situated on the Apennine Mountains and forms part of the Comino Valley.

== Geography ==
The area is historically tied to the Mezzogiorno, the Italian "South", only relatively recently in the 1920s Fascist rule, was it transferred to the "central" province of Lazio along with Latina from the Terra di Lavoro, which was a giustizierato (circumscription) of the former Kingdom of Naples.

It borders the communes Acquafondata, Cervaro, Filignano, Rocchetta a Volturno, San Biagio Saracinisco, Sant'Elia Fiumerapido, and Viticuso.
