= Monteferrante =

- Comune
- Comune di Monteferrante
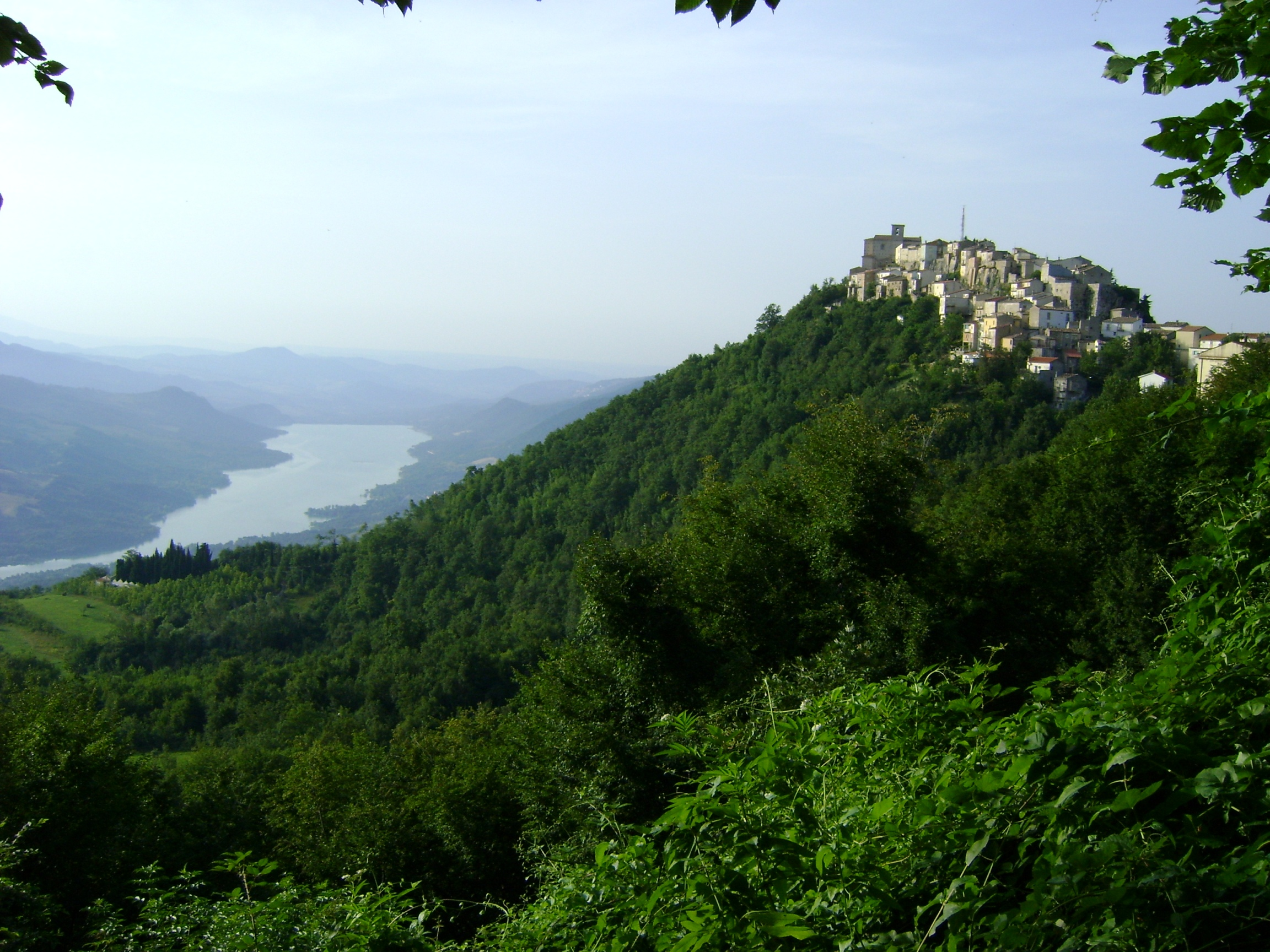

- Coat of arms

- Location within Italy Location within Abruzzo
- Coordinates: 41°57′N 14°23′E
- Country: Italy
- Region: Abruzzo
- Province: Chieti (CH)

Government
  - Mayor: Patrizia D'Ottavio

Area
  - Total: 15 km^{2} (5.8 sq mi)
- Elevation: 850 m (2,790 ft)

Population (2004)
  - Total: 176
  - Density: 12/km^{2} (30/sq mi)
- Demonym: Monteferrantesi
- Time zone: UTC+1 (CET)
  - Summer (DST): UTC+2 (CEST)
- Postal code: 66040
- Dialing code: 0872
- Patron saint: St. John the Baptist
- Saint day: 29 August
- Website: Official website

Monteferrante is a comune and town in the province of Chieti in the Abruzzo region of Italy
