= Monti della Meta =

Massif in Italy

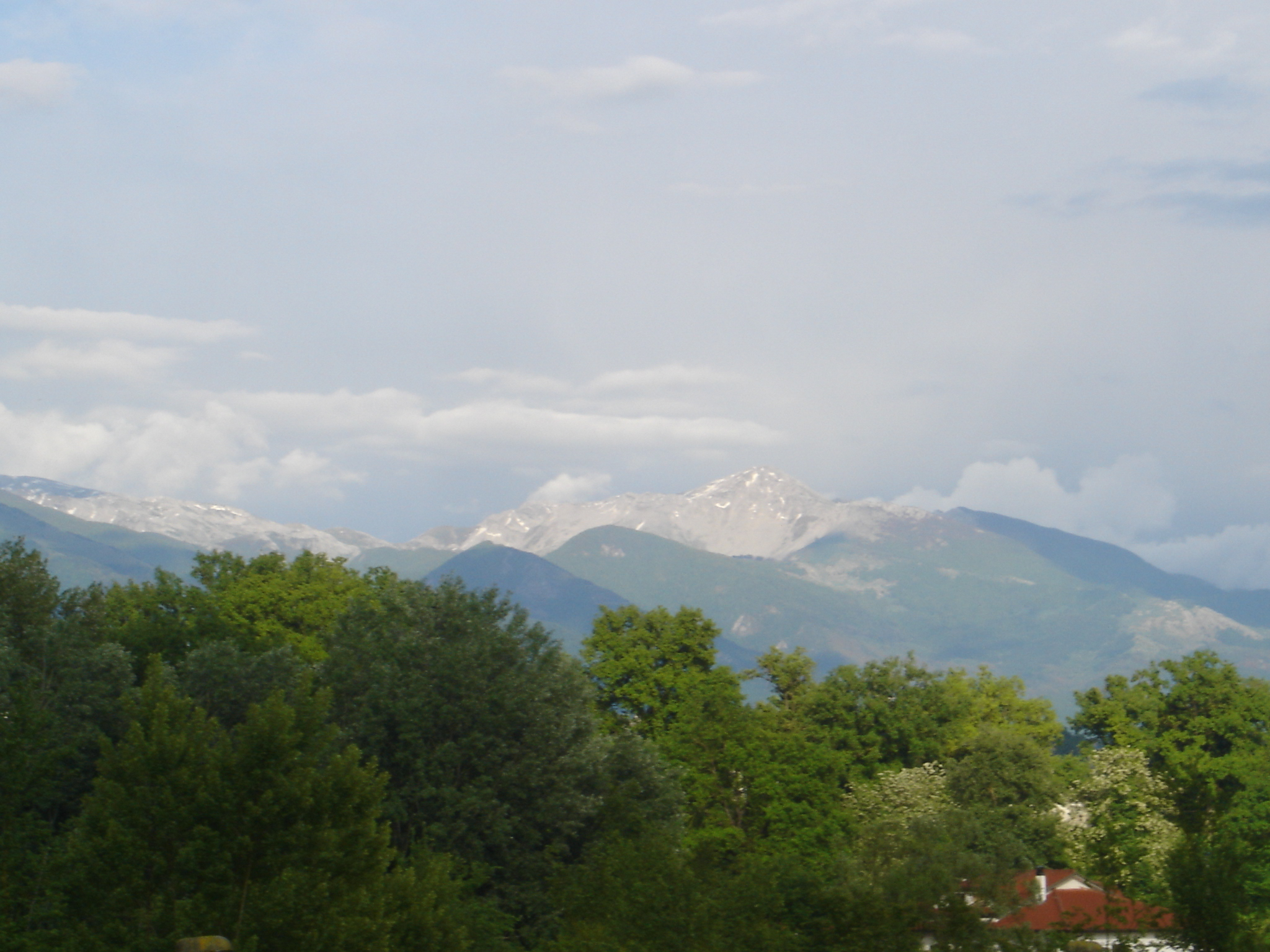
- Monte Meta seen from Picinisco

Highest point
- Elevation: 2,249 m (7,379 ft); Monte Petroso
- Coordinates: 41°40′55″N 13°54′45″E

Geography
- Location within Italy
- Location: Lazio, Abruzzo and Molise, Italy
- Parent range: Central Apennines

The Monti della Meta are a massif of central Italy located around the junction point of the boundaries between the regions of Lazio, Abruzzo and Molise. The major of three massifs of the Parco Nazionale d'Abruzzo, Lazio e Molise, they take their name from one of the peaks, Monte Meta.

== Overview ==
The massif covers a map area of about 93.29 km^{2} (36.02 sq mi), with a minimum elevation of 450 m (1,480 ft), a maximum elevation of 2,249 m (7,379 ft) and a mean elevation of 1,000 m (3,300 ft).

All the highest peaks (including the Monte Petroso, 2,247 m, Monte Cavallo, 2,039 m and Monte Mare, 2,020 m) show traces of Quaternary glaciation. Valleys in the chain include those of the Melfa and Mollarino rivers in the province of Frosinone, and the Rio Torto in the province of L'Aquila.

The southern part of the massif, on the boundary between Molise and Lazio, is the Monti delle Mainarde. Here, historically, the human presence has been not seasonal as in the highest slopes.

== Bibliography ==
- Caruso, F. (1995). Nel parco nazionale d'Abruzzo. Città di Castello: Tipografia Petruzzi.
