= Picinisco =

- Comune
- Comune di Picinisco
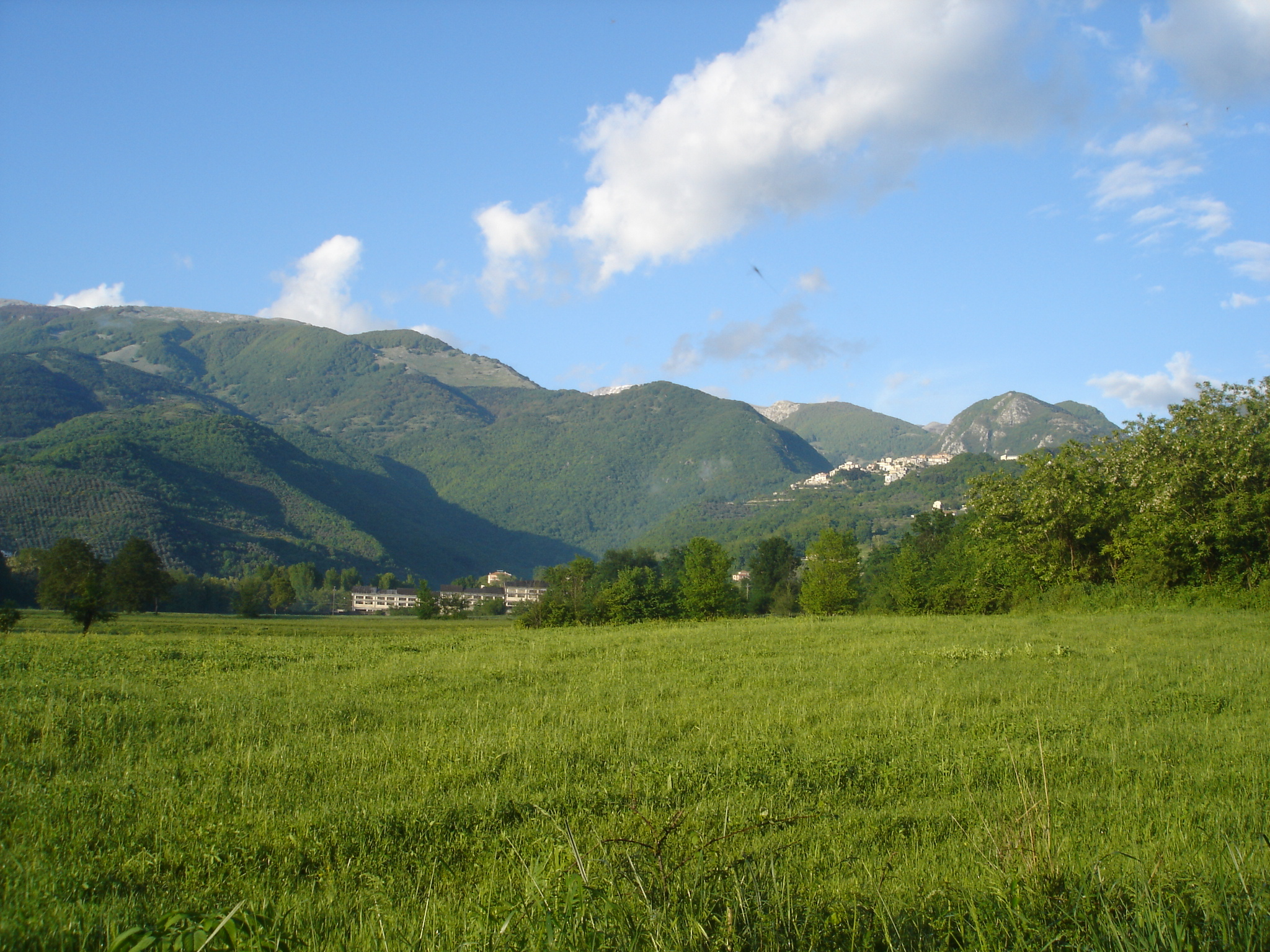
- View of Picinisco

- Location within Italy Location within Lazio
- Coordinates: 41°39′N 13°52′E
- Country: Italy
- Region: Lazio
- Province: Frosinone (FR)
- Frazioni: Borgo Castellone, Fontitune, L'Antica, Liscia, Rocca degli Alberi, San Gennaro, San Giuseppe, Valle Porcina

Government
  - Mayor: Marco Scappaticci

Area
  - Total: 62.15 km^{2} (24.00 sq mi)
- Elevation: 725 m (2,379 ft)

Population (31 March 2018)
  - Total: 1,166
  - Density: 18.76/km^{2} (48.59/sq mi)
- Demonym: Piciniscani
- Time zone: UTC+1 (CET)
  - Summer (DST): UTC+2 (CEST)
- Postal code: 03040
- Dialing code: 0776
- Patron saint: St. Lawrence
- Saint day: 10 August
- Website: Official website

Picinisco (locally Pecenische) is a comune (municipality) in the Province of Frosinone in the Italian region Lazio, located about 120 kilometres (75 mi) east of Rome and about 45 kilometres (28 mi) east of Frosinone. It is included in the Valle di Comino and National Park of Abruzzo, Lazio e Molise.

== History ==
Picinisco was already inhabited, by Sabellian peoples, before it was subsumed into the expanding Roman Empire over two thousand years ago. The first surviving written record of Picinisco dates from the middle of the 12th century, when King Roger II of Sicily defined through a decree the territorial limits of the adjacent town of Atina. From then until 1806, Piciniso belonged to the Duchy of Alvito, a fiefdom within the Kingdom of Naples, and later on was part of the Kingdom of the Two Sicilies.

During the Italian unification process, Picinisco became part of the Kingdom of Italy in 1861.

Picinisco is of note as one of the main sources of Italian immigration to Scotland. Together with the village of Barga in Tuscany it is estimated that over 60 percent of Scots Italians can trace their ancestry to either of these villages. Included among many of the Italian surnames that originate from around Picinisco are, Arcari, Boni, Capaldi, Capocci, Cervi, Conetta, Coppola, Crolla, Dalsasso, D'Ambrosio, DiCiacca, De Luca, De Marco, Marini, Pacitti, Pelosi, Pia, Tartaglia and Ventre. Scottish descendants of Piciniscani are an almost constant feature as visitors and returnees to the comune.

== See also ==
- Monte Meta
