= List of municipalities of the province of Isernia =

The following is a list of the 52 municipalities (comuni) of the Province of Isernia in the region of Molise in Italy.

== List ==
Municipality	Population (2026)	Area (km²)	Density
Acquaviva d'Isernia	346	13.51	25.6
Agnone	4,545	96.85	46.9
Bagnoli del Trigno	607	36.80	16.5
Belmonte del Sannio	602	20.32	29.6
Cantalupo nel Sannio	726	15.64	46.4
Capracotta	742	42.55	17.4
Carovilli	1,240	41.56	29.8
Carpinone	980	32.43	30.2
Castel del Giudice	306	14.81	20.7
Castel San Vincenzo	418	21.98	19.0
Castelpetroso	1,496	22.71	65.9
Castelpizzuto	135	15.39	8.8
Castelverrino	87	6.20	14.0
Cerro al Volturno	1,103	23.79	46.4
Chiauci	189	15.85	11.9
Civitanova del Sannio	863	50.47	17.1
Colli a Volturno	1,253	25.25	49.6
Conca Casale	162	14.43	11.2
Filignano	564	30.88	18.3
Forlì del Sannio	627	32.56	19.3
Fornelli	1,778	23.17	76.7
Frosolone	2,721	49.89	54.5
Isernia	20,491	69.15	296.3
Longano	618	27.38	22.6
Macchia d'Isernia	1,020	17.71	57.6
Macchiagodena	1,655	34.35	48.2
Miranda	913	22.15	41.2
Montaquila	2,218	25.45	87.2
Montenero Val Cocchiara	464	22.02	21.1
Monteroduni	2,121	37.22	57.0
Pesche	1,437	12.96	110.9
Pescolanciano	780	34.73	22.5
Pescopennataro	225	18.84	11.9
Pettoranello del Molise	451	15.58	28.9
Pietrabbondante	559	27.44	20.4
Pizzone	287	33.49	8.6
Poggio Sannita	513	25.74	19.9
Pozzilli	2,163	34.66	62.4
Rionero Sannitico	941	29.22	32.2
Roccamandolfi	803	53.67	15.0
Roccasicura	460	28.61	16.1
Rocchetta a Volturno	1,066	23.34	45.7
San Pietro Avellana	390	44.95	8.7
Sant'Agapito	1,333	15.93	83.7
Sant'Angelo del Pesco	300	15.59	19.2
Sant'Elena Sannita	298	14.08	21.2
Santa Maria del Molise	645	17.20	37.5
Scapoli	559	18.94	29.5
Sessano del Molise	664	25.32	26.2
Sesto Campano	2,134	35.32	60.4
Vastogirardi	574	60.71	9.5
Venafro	10,645	46.45	229.2

== See also ==
- List of municipalities of Molise
- List of municipalities of Italy
