= List of municipalities of Molise =

Location of Molise within Italy

Provinces of Molise

The following is a list of the municipalities (comuni) of the region of Molise in Italy.

There are 136 municipalities in Molise as of 2026:

- 84 in the Province of Campobasso
- 52 in the Province of Isernia

== List ==
Municipality	Province	Population (2026)	Area (km²)	Density
Acquaviva Collecroce	Campobasso	536	28.60	18.7
Acquaviva d'Isernia	Isernia	346	13.51	25.6
Agnone	Isernia	4,545	96.85	46.9
Bagnoli del Trigno	Isernia	607	36.80	16.5
Baranello	Campobasso	2,424	25.00	97.0
Belmonte del Sannio	Isernia	602	20.32	29.6
Bojano	Campobasso	7,496	52.63	142.4
Bonefro	Campobasso	1,128	31.28	36.1
Busso	Campobasso	1,142	23.81	48.0
Campobasso	Campobasso	47,399	56.11	844.8
Campochiaro	Campobasso	556	35.70	15.6
Campodipietra	Campobasso	2,403	19.72	121.9
Campolieto	Campobasso	793	24.43	32.5
Campomarino	Campobasso	7,974	76.68	104.0
Cantalupo nel Sannio	Isernia	726	15.64	46.4
Capracotta	Isernia	742	42.55	17.4
Carovilli	Isernia	1,240	41.56	29.8
Carpinone	Isernia	980	32.43	30.2
Casacalenda	Campobasso	1,824	67.28	27.1
Casalciprano	Campobasso	424	19.07	22.2
Castel del Giudice	Isernia	306	14.81	20.7
Castel San Vincenzo	Isernia	418	21.98	19.0
Castelbottaccio	Campobasso	223	11.22	19.9
Castellino del Biferno	Campobasso	417	15.54	26.8
Castelmauro	Campobasso	1,075	43.62	24.6
Castelpetroso	Isernia	1,496	22.71	65.9
Castelpizzuto	Isernia	135	15.39	8.8
Castelverrino	Isernia	87	6.20	14.0
Castropignano	Campobasso	839	26.96	31.1
Cercemaggiore	Campobasso	3,529	56.91	62.0
Cercepiccola	Campobasso	660	16.79	39.3
Cerro al Volturno	Isernia	1,103	23.79	46.4
Chiauci	Isernia	189	15.85	11.9
Civitacampomarano	Campobasso	277	38.89	7.1
Civitanova del Sannio	Isernia	863	50.47	17.1
Colle d'Anchise	Campobasso	709	15.69	45.2
Colletorto	Campobasso	1,618	35.91	45.1
Colli a Volturno	Isernia	1,253	25.25	49.6
Conca Casale	Isernia	162	14.43	11.2
Duronia	Campobasso	378	22.47	16.8
Ferrazzano	Campobasso	3,390	16.77	202.1
Filignano	Isernia	564	30.88	18.3
Forlì del Sannio	Isernia	627	32.56	19.3
Fornelli	Isernia	1,778	23.17	76.7
Fossalto	Campobasso	1,099	28.33	38.8
Frosolone	Isernia	2,721	49.89	54.5
Gambatesa	Campobasso	1,233	43.69	28.2
Gildone	Campobasso	707	29.76	23.8
Guardialfiera	Campobasso	942	43.53	21.6
Guardiaregia	Campobasso	659	43.71	15.1
Guglionesi	Campobasso	4,874	100.95	48.3
Isernia	Isernia	20,491	69.15	296.3
Jelsi	Campobasso	1,530	28.77	53.2
Larino	Campobasso	6,257	88.77	70.5
Limosano	Campobasso	661	28.27	23.4
Longano	Isernia	618	27.38	22.6
Lucito	Campobasso	616	31.56	19.5
Lupara	Campobasso	391	25.87	15.1
Macchia d'Isernia	Isernia	1,020	17.71	57.6
Macchia Valfortore	Campobasso	439	26.77	16.4
Macchiagodena	Isernia	1,655	34.35	48.2
Mafalda	Campobasso	1,074	32.51	33.0
Matrice	Campobasso	1,019	20.42	49.9
Mirabello Sannitico	Campobasso	2,034	21.43	94.9
Miranda	Isernia	913	22.15	41.2
Molise	Campobasso	144	5.20	27.7
Monacilioni	Campobasso	439	27.21	16.1
Montagano	Campobasso	951	26.62	35.7
Montaquila	Isernia	2,218	25.45	87.2
Montecilfone	Campobasso	1,220	22.92	53.2
Montefalcone nel Sannio	Campobasso	1,313	32.57	40.3
Montelongo	Campobasso	276	12.76	21.6
Montemitro	Campobasso	282	16.30	17.3
Montenero di Bisaccia	Campobasso	6,186	93.32	66.3
Montenero Val Cocchiara	Isernia	464	22.02	21.1
Monteroduni	Isernia	2,121	37.22	57.0
Montorio nei Frentani	Campobasso	342	31.66	10.8
Morrone del Sannio	Campobasso	505	45.84	11.0
Oratino	Campobasso	1,678	17.89	93.8
Palata	Campobasso	1,455	43.82	33.2
Pesche	Isernia	1,437	12.96	110.9
Pescolanciano	Isernia	780	34.73	22.5
Pescopennataro	Isernia	225	18.84	11.9
Petacciato	Campobasso	3,553	35.40	100.4
Petrella Tifernina	Campobasso	990	26.52	37.3
Pettoranello del Molise	Isernia	451	15.58	28.9
Pietrabbondante	Isernia	559	27.44	20.4
Pietracatella	Campobasso	1,192	50.28	23.7
Pietracupa	Campobasso	181	10.08	18.0
Pizzone	Isernia	287	33.49	8.6
Poggio Sannita	Isernia	513	25.74	19.9
Portocannone	Campobasso	2,323	13.11	177.2
Pozzilli	Isernia	2,163	34.66	62.4
Provvidenti	Campobasso	97	14.03	6.9
Riccia	Campobasso	4,646	70.04	66.3
Rionero Sannitico	Isernia	941	29.22	32.2
Ripabottoni	Campobasso	410	31.96	12.8
Ripalimosani	Campobasso	2,970	33.83	87.8
Roccamandolfi	Isernia	803	53.67	15.0
Roccasicura	Isernia	460	28.61	16.1
Roccavivara	Campobasso	567	21.05	26.9
Rocchetta a Volturno	Isernia	1,066	23.34	45.7
Rotello	Campobasso	1,123	70.75	15.9
Salcito	Campobasso	639	28.26	22.6
San Biase	Campobasso	117	11.85	9.9
San Felice del Molise	Campobasso	525	24.37	21.5
San Giacomo degli Schiavoni	Campobasso	1,375	11.08	124.1
San Giovanni in Galdo	Campobasso	495	19.45	25.4
San Giuliano del Sannio	Campobasso	956	24.05	39.8
San Giuliano di Puglia	Campobasso	957	42.05	22.8
San Martino in Pensilis	Campobasso	4,365	100.66	43.4
San Massimo	Campobasso	825	27.33	30.2
San Pietro Avellana	Isernia	390	44.95	8.7
San Polo Matese	Campobasso	487	15.28	31.9
Sant'Agapito	Isernia	1,333	15.93	83.7
Sant'Angelo del Pesco	Isernia	300	15.59	19.2
Sant'Angelo Limosano	Campobasso	298	16.87	17.7
Sant'Elena Sannita	Isernia	298	14.08	21.2
Sant'Elia a Pianisi	Campobasso	1,480	68.25	21.7
Santa Croce di Magliano	Campobasso	3,820	53.37	71.6
Santa Maria del Molise	Isernia	645	17.20	37.5
Scapoli	Isernia	559	18.94	29.5
Sepino	Campobasso	1,815	61.37	29.6
Sessano del Molise	Isernia	664	25.32	26.2
Sesto Campano	Isernia	2,134	35.32	60.4
Spinete	Campobasso	1,128	17.83	63.3
Tavenna	Campobasso	545	21.97	24.8
Termoli	Campobasso	31,754	55.64	570.7
Torella del Sannio	Campobasso	676	16.73	40.4
Toro	Campobasso	1,209	24.06	50.2
Trivento	Campobasso	4,298	73.70	58.3
Tufara	Campobasso	748	35.52	21.1
Ururi	Campobasso	2,321	31.65	73.3
Vastogirardi	Isernia	574	60.71	9.5
Venafro	Isernia	10,645	46.45	229.2
Vinchiaturo	Campobasso	3,298	35.48	93.0

== See also ==
- List of municipalities of Italy
