= Acquafondata =

- Comune
- Comune di Acquafondata
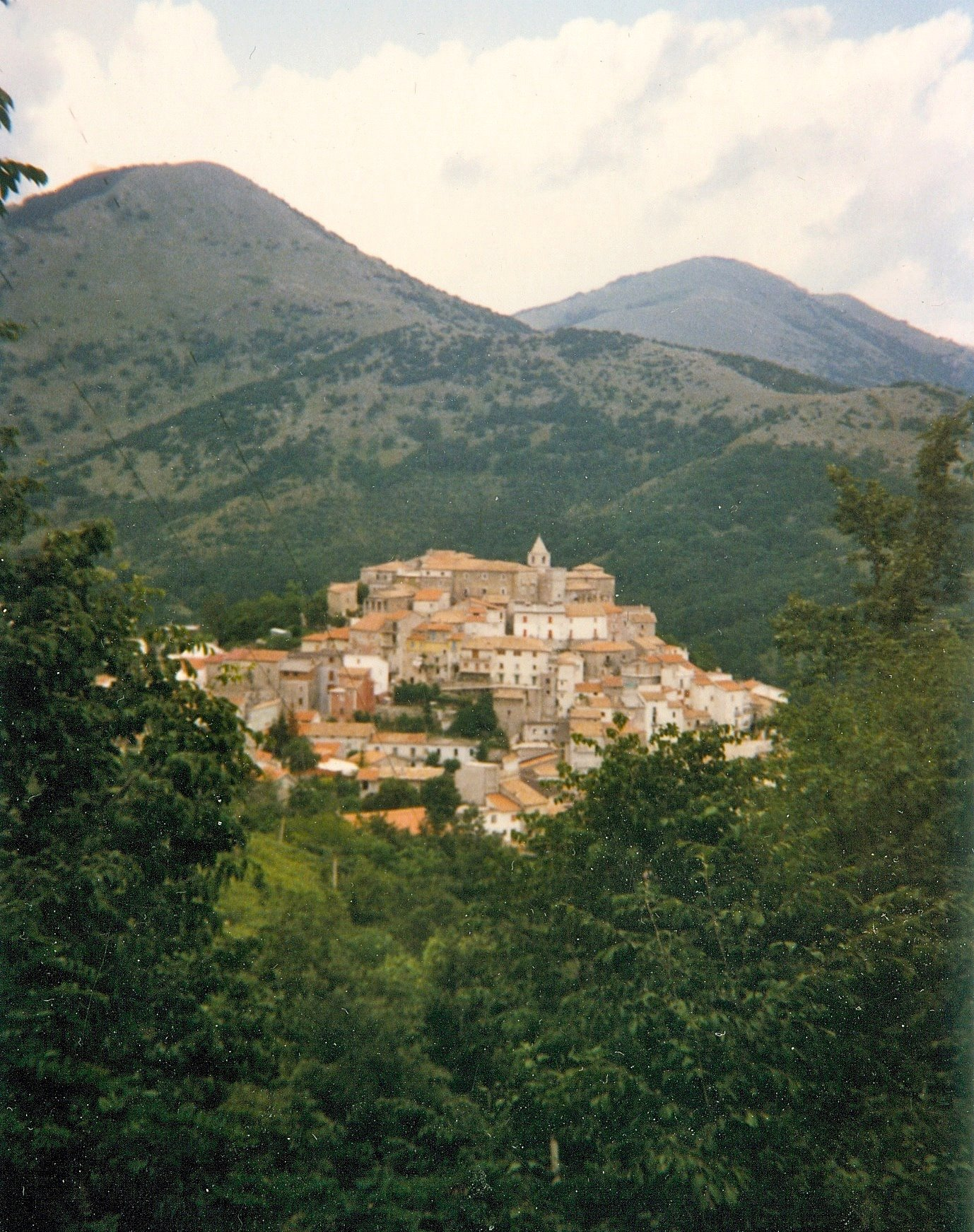
- View of Acquafondata

- Location within Italy Location within Lazio
- Coordinates: 41°33′N 13°57′E
- Country: Italy
- Region: Lazio
- Province: Frosinone (FR)
- Frazioni: Casal Cassinese, Fontana

Government
  - Mayor: Antonio Di Meo

Area
  - Total: 25.32 km^{2} (9.78 sq mi)
- Elevation: 926 m (3,038 ft)

Population (31 December 2017)
  - Total: 267
  - Density: 10.5/km^{2} (27.3/sq mi)
- Demonym: Acquafondatari
- Time zone: UTC+1 (CET)
  - Summer (DST): UTC+2 (CEST)
- Postal code: 03040
- Dialing code: 0776
- Patron saint: St. John the Baptist
- Saint day: August 29
- Website: Official website

Acquafondata (Campanian: Acuaf'ûnnata, Latin: Aquafundata) is a comune (municipality) in the province of Frosinone, in the Italian region of Lazio, located in the Monti della Meta area, about 130 kilometres (81 mi) southeast of Rome and about 50 kilometres (31 mi) east of Frosinone.

== History ==
During World War II, Acquafondata was occupied by the Germans, who guarded the Gustav Line on the Cassino side and the Reinhard Line on the Molise side. The liberation of Acquafondata took place on 12 January 1944 by the French Expeditionary Corps who broke through on the Venafro side. Two survivors, Romano Neri and Domenico Mancone, were awarded knighthoods by the Presidency of the Republic for their role in the liberation.

== Geography ==
Located in the middle of a valley and surrounded by the Monti della Meta, the built-up area is located at 926 m asl, on a limestone hillock dominated by Monte Monna Casale, (1395 m asl) in the southern Mainarde area. The valley produces potatoes and legumes. Reclamation work, through the construction of a tunnel for draining unhealthy waters, began in 1882 and saw its completion in 1901. Near the hamlet of Casalcassinese there are the springs of the Rava stream, which flows south-east, in the direction of Pozzilli, before flowing into the San Bartolomeo River, a tributary of the Volturno.

== Architecture ==
The commune contains the Chiesa parrocchiale di sant'Antonio di Padova, Santuario della Madonna del Carmin, Chiesa di san Rocco and Chiesa di Santa Maria in Centumcellis and a number of notable World War II monuments, including to the Italians and the Polish.

The small sanctuary of the Madonna del Carmine, in the parish of San Giovanni Battista in Acquafondata, stands on the provincial road 41, near the pass of the "Serre ", on the extreme offshoots of the Meta mountains at almost 1000 meters. above sea level.

== Sanctuary of Our Lady of Mount Carmel (Acquafondata) ==
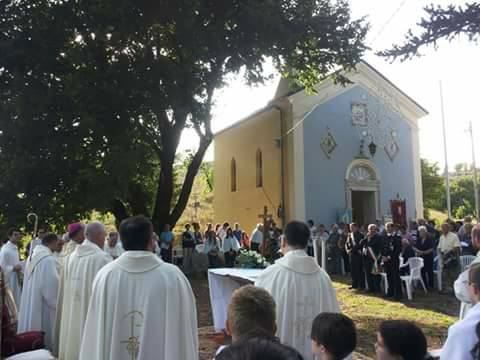
il santuario

It is immersed in the green of suggestive pine forests, surrounded by large secular lime trees, is 1 km from the center of Acquafondata and less than 2 km from the border with the municipal area of Vallerotonda . According to tradition, the sanctuary was erected on the site of the apparition of the Our Lady of Mount Carmel to Nicolina Carcillo, which took place on July 16, 1841.

The sanctuary is a point of reference for Marian devotion, especially in the month of July, for the inhabitants of the neighboring towns and for those who wish to spend time dedicated to peace, relaxation and spirituality. In the evocative setting of an uncontaminated mountain landscape, the visitor restores himself in contact with nature; the pilgrim is favored in personal and community prayer in specially prepared spaces, such as the ascent path to the " Little Mount Carmel " or the "Path of the XII stars".

== History ==
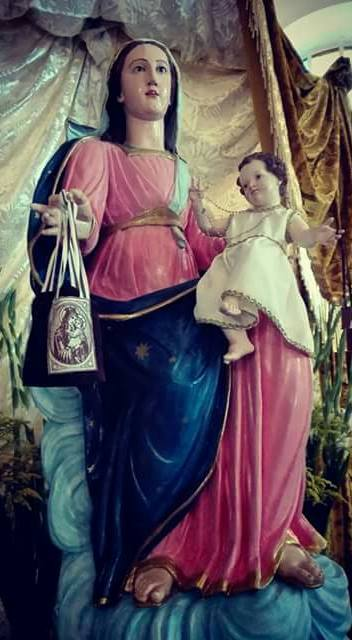
La venerata immagine lignea

The foundation of the first chapel dedicated to the Our Lady of Mount Carmel in Acquafondata dates back to 1841, as can be seen from the date carved in the architrave of the access door. The small rock construction, built in local stone and pozzolana, has a simple barrel vault, made up of stones wedged between them. This first and humble temple is now incorporated under the altar of the new church, built in the 1930s; it houses the valuable wooden image of the Madonna del Carmine dating back to the end of the century. XIX. The sculpture was transported to the parish church of Filignanoa few years after its construction, to safeguard it from the neglect of the church of Acquafondata due to infiltration of the roof.

Between 1955 and 1960, the structure was recovered, damaged by the war events of the Second World War; the old chapel, unlike the new church, is not damaged.

On 5 July 1964 the ancient statue left the parish of Filignano to return to its sanctuary.

Between 1968 and 1969 the holy water font and the altar were built in the large church, and the marble high relief in the old chapel. Also in 1969 a bell was donated and placed in a single lancet window on the roof, to celebrate the first five years since the statue's return. All of these works are realized at the expense of devoted families and citizens residing in the United States.

In 2014, in memory of the fiftieth anniversary of the return of the statue of the Madonna, a Peregrinatio Mariae took place in the parishes adjacent to the sanctuary, which ended with the solemn coronation of the venerated image, on 30 July of the same year, by the hands of the Apostolic Administrator. or of the territorial Abbey of Montecassino . On 30 July 2015, one year after the coronation, the sanctuary was visited by the first bishop of the new Diocese of Sora-Cassino-Aquino-Pontecorvo .

In 2017 a precious local stone altar was erected on the lawn in front of the sanctuary, for outdoor celebrations.

=== The apparition to Nicolina Carcillo ===
According to local oral tradition and historical accounts, the origins of the sanctuary are associated with an apparition of the Virgin Mary under the title of Our Lady of Mount Carmel to the peasant Nicolina Carcillo (1783–1862).

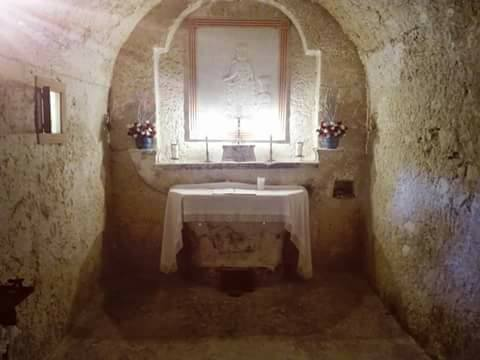
L'antica cappellina dell'apparizione (The old chapel at the site of the apparition)

On 16 July 1841, the feast of Our Lady of Mount Carmel, Nicolina Carcillo and other peasants from Acquafondata reportedly went to work in the fields, treating the day as an ordinary working day despite its religious significance. According to the tradition, the Virgin Mary appeared to Nicolina and asked her to promote the construction of a chapel at the site, which would serve as a place of prayer and devotion. She also reportedly requested that the feast of 16 July thereafter be observed through religious practices and by refraining from agricultural work.

Nicolina was reportedly troubled by the request, fearing that she would be unable to fulfil it. Her husband, Benedetto Simeone (1781–1861), was described in the accounts as an unbeliever and, she feared, would not accept her testimony or support the construction of the chapel. According to the tradition, before disappearing, the Virgin left a sign by overturning a large stone, which Nicolina was subsequently able to show her husband and the other local farmers.

The account of the apparition was transmitted among the inhabitants of the area, who eventually contributed to the construction of a chapel at the site. The chapel became a destination for pilgrims and a centre of Marian devotion. In 1962, the parish priest, Don Ferdinando De Filippis, and the Passionist priest Fortunato Marsegli compiled historical notes concerning the reported apparition of 1841, drawing primarily on local oral tradition. Their account also recorded other miracles and extraordinary events attributed to the Virgin’s intercession at the sanctuary.

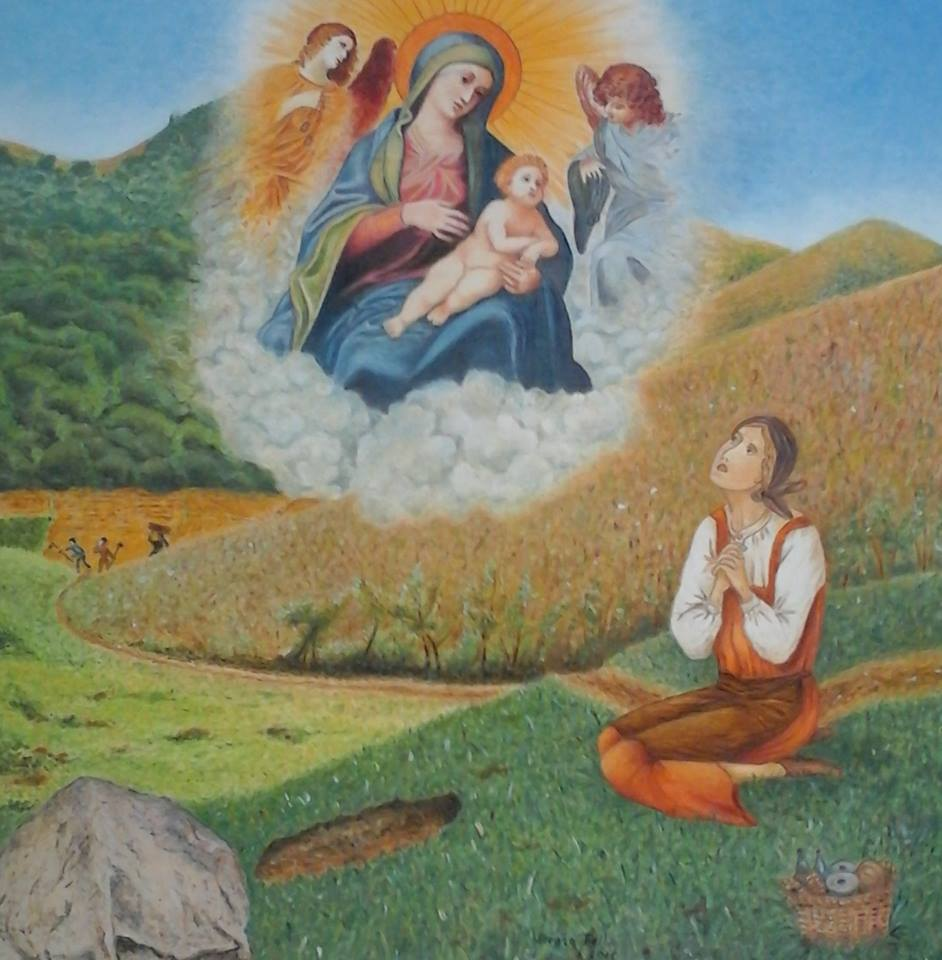
Apparizione del 16 luglio 1841 (The apparition of 16 July 1841)

Although the supernatural nature of the reported apparition has not been officially recognised by the Catholic Church, the site has remained an important place of Marian devotion. The original chapel, reportedly built in 1841 by the Simeone family, and the church subsequently erected alongside it have continued to attract pilgrims and devotees. The chapel’s association with the reported apparition and the enduring devotion of the faithful have contributed to its status as a local sanctuary. Episcopal visits and the continued celebration of religious observances at the site reflect the ongoing devotional significance of the place, although they do not constitute formal ecclesiastical recognition of the apparition.

== Holidays and anniversaries ==
- Easter Monday (Easter Monday ) opening of the sanctuary after the winter break
- the "Ascent of the Madonna" on the first Saturday of July First Saturday of July : pilgrimage on foot of the communities adjacent to the sanctuary for the opening of the month dedicated to the Madonna del Carmine. The statue of the Madonna leaves the parish church of Acquafondata, kept there in the winter, and is carried in procession to the sanctuary.
- From 1 to 16 July : every afternoon at the sanctuary celebration of the Holy Mass and the " sedicina " in preparation for the feast.
- July 16 : (liturgical memorial of Our Lady of Mount Carmel and anniversary of the apparition) evening Mass and torchlight procession accompanying the statue of the Madonna to the parish of Acquafondata.
- Last Saturday of July : (remembrance of the solemn coronation of 2014) procession from the parish of Acquafondata, the statue of the Madonna returns to the sanctuary and remains there for the whole month of August.
- 28 August : Acquafondata pilgrimage on the eve of the patronal feast of the community; from the sanctuary a solemn procession accompanies the statue of the Madonna in the parish church where it will remain kept until July of the following year.
- Indoor 8 December (Immaculate Conception) Concluding celebration at the end of the sanctuary for the winter break.

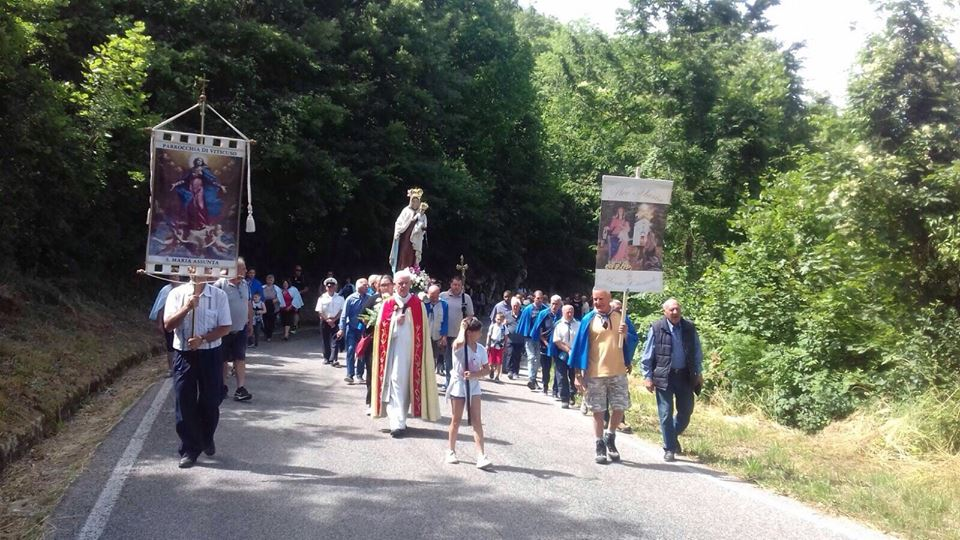
la "Salita della Madonna" il primo sabato di luglio

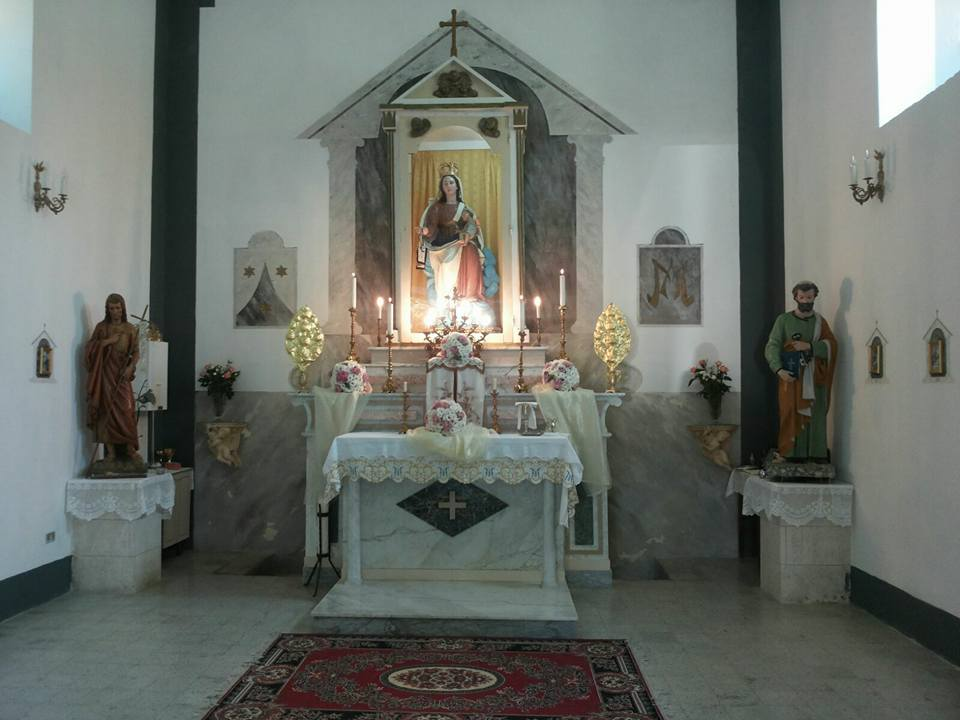
Interno

== Bibliography ==
- Parish archive .
- Emilio Pistilli. Acquafondata Casalcassinese. Cassino 2004
- De filippis, Arciprete parroco Ferdinando (1962). Cenni storici sulla grande apparizione della Madonna del Carmine in Acquafondata il 16 luglio 1841. Acquafondata.
- Antonio Esposito, Ciociaria and no, the island without the sea, Youcanprint 2016
