= Monteroduni =

- Comune
- Comune di Monteroduni
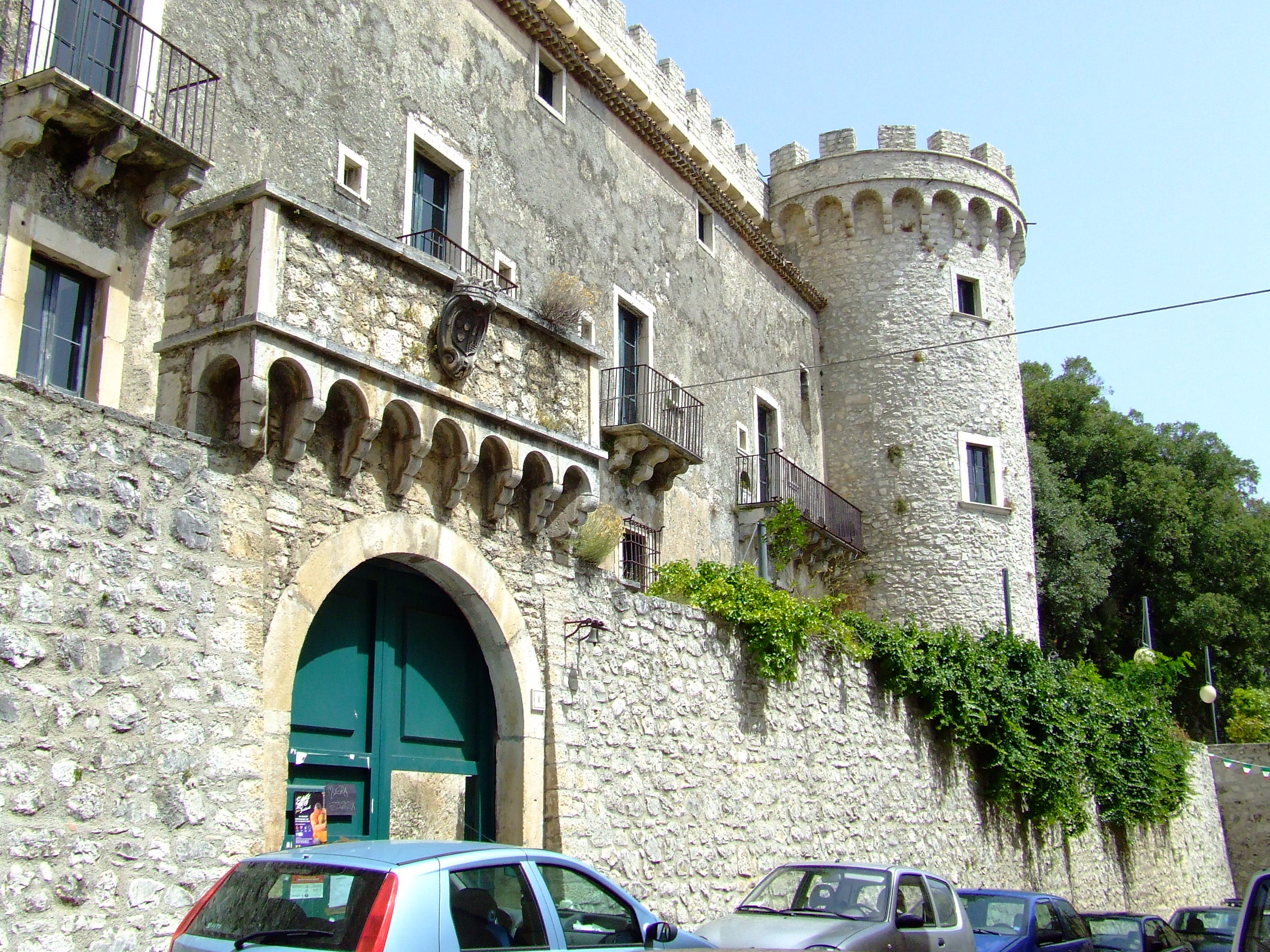
- Castello Pignatelli

- Coat of arms

- Location within Italy Location within Molise
- Coordinates: 41°31′N 14°10′E
- Country: Italy
- Region: Molise
- Province: Isernia (IS)
- Frazioni: Campo Fiorito, Campo la Fontana, Carpinete, Guado Largo, Limate, Pagliara, San Nazzaro, Sant'Eusanio, Selvotta, Socce, Starze

Government
  - Mayor: Nicola Altobelli

Area
  - Total: 37.22 km^{2} (14.37 sq mi)
- Elevation: 476 m (1,562 ft)

Population (31 August 2022)
  - Total: 2,054
  - Density: 55.19/km^{2} (142.9/sq mi)
- Demonym: Monterodunesi
- Time zone: UTC+1 (CET)
  - Summer (DST): UTC+2 (CEST)
- Postal code: 86075
- Dialing code: 0865
- Patron saint: St. Michael Archangel
- Saint day: 29 September
- Website: Official website

Monteroduni is a comune (municipality) in the Province of Isernia in the Italian region Molise, located about 40 kilometres (25 mi) west of Campobasso and about 11 kilometres (7 mi) southwest of Isernia.

The town's name derives from the ancient one of the river Volturno, Olotrunus. Sights include the Pignatelli Castle, built by the Lombards in the 9th century and later enlarged under the D'Evoli family.

Monteroduni borders the following municipalities: Capriati a Volturno, Colli a Volturno, Gallo Matese, Longano, Macchia d'Isernia, Montaquila, Pozzilli, Sant'Agapito.

== See also ==
- Ad Rotas
