= Albert N. Gualano =

American judge (1868–1960)

Alberto Nicola Gualano was born in San Vincenzo al Volturno (now Castel San Vincenzo), Italy, 1868, to a prominent family of the region. After a primary education at Convitto Nazionale Victor Emanuel II in Naples, he emigrated to America in 1890 and was soon followed by many relatives, including his five children. He graduated from both Northwestern University and Illinois College of Law in Chicago. Admitted to the bar in 1904, he became a prominent figure within the Italian community of Chicago and active in both political and trade union circles. In 1922 he was elected Judge of the Municipal Court, and became the first American judge of Italian birth. He died in 1960 in Sylmar, San Fernando, California, his descendants still living in America to this day. He published many works in Italian and English, among them a few novels, as well as he played the flute, belonging to a professional orchestra directed by his brother Ettore. Member of the Illinois Bar Association, Modern Woodmen, Italo-American National Union, Order of the Sons of Italy, and Phi Alpha Delta fraternity. In September 1922 he received from king Victor Emanuel III the knighthood of the Ordine della Corona d'Italia.
