= Volturno =

River in south central Italy

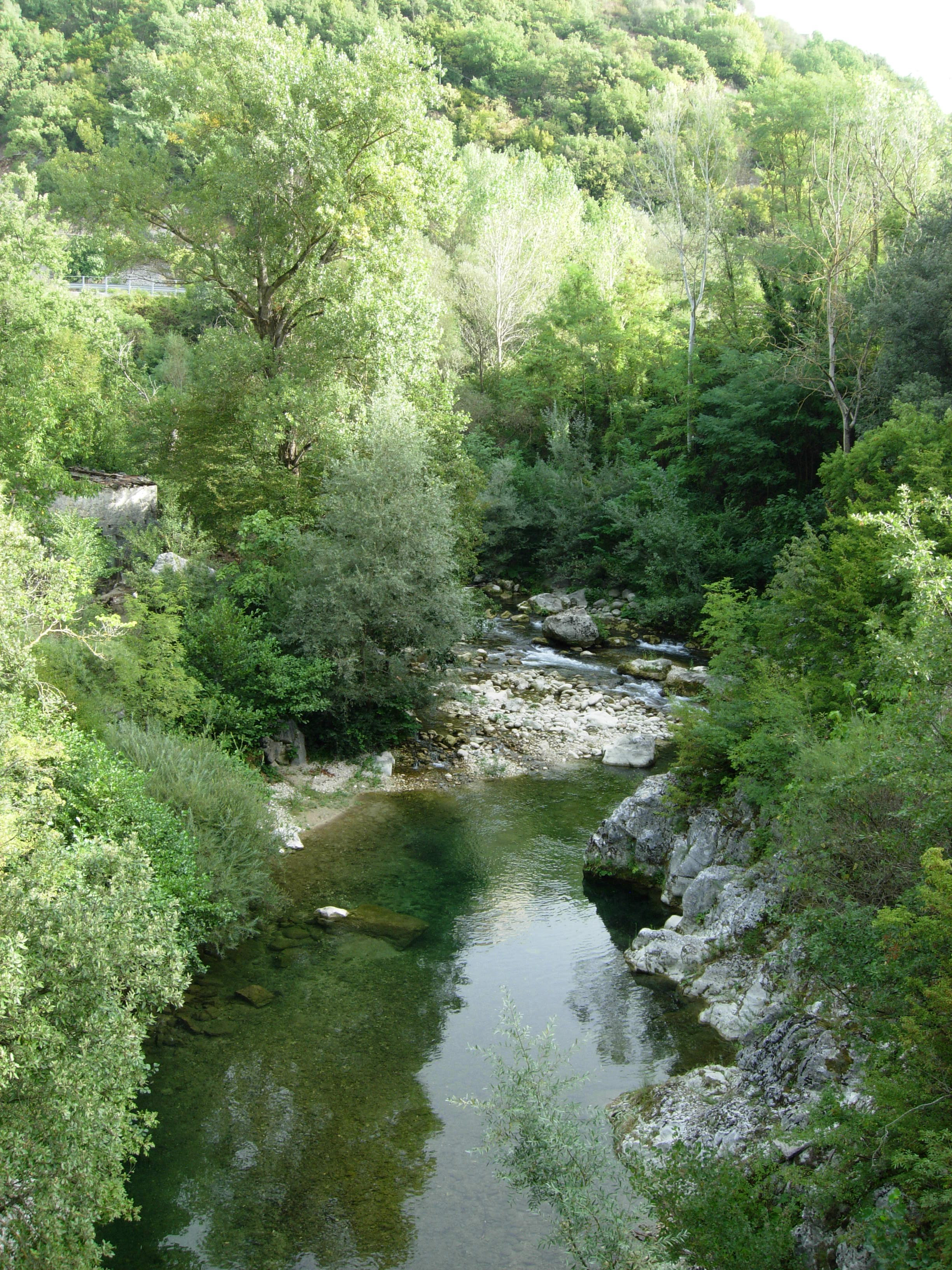
- The river near Colli a Volturno

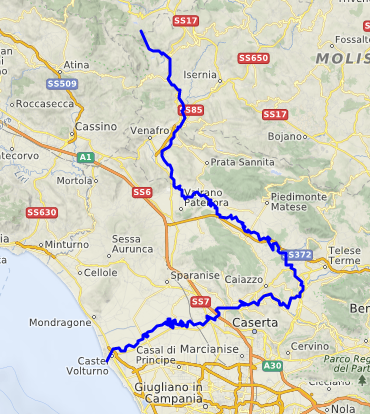

Location
- Country: Italy

Physical characteristics
- Source
  - location: near Rocchetta a Volturno
  - elevation: about 500 m (1,600 ft)
- Mouth: Tyrrhenian Sea
  - location: Castel Volturno
  - coordinates: 41.0233°N 13.9254°E
- Length: 175 km (109 mi)
- Basin size: 5,550 km^{2} (2,140 sq mi)
- Discharge
  - average: 82.1 m^{3}/s (2,900 cu ft/s)

The Volturno (ancient Latin name Volturnus, from volvere, to roll) is a river in south-central Italy.

== Geography ==
It rises in the Abruzzese central Apennines of Samnium near Castel San Vincenzo (province of Isernia, Molise) and flows southeast as far as its junction with the Calore Irpino near Caiazzo and runs south as far as Venafro, and then turns southwest, past Capua, to enter the Tyrrhenian Sea in Castel Volturno, northwest of Naples. The river is 175 kilometres (109 mi) long.

After a course of some 120 kilometres (75 mi) it receives, about 8 kilometres (5 mi) east of Caiazzo, the Calore River. The united stream now flows west-southwest past Capua, where the Via Appia and Latina joined just to the north of the bridge over it, and so through the Campanian plain, with many windings, into the sea. The direct length of the lower course is about 50 kilometres (31 mi), so that the whole is slightly longer than that of the Liri-Garigliano, and its basin far larger.

Its main tributaries are San Bartolomeo, Lete, Torano, Rivo Tella, Titerno, Calore Irpino and Isclero.

== History ==
The river has always had a considerable military importance, and the colony of Volturnum (no doubt preceded by an older, possibly even Etruscan, port of Capua) was founded in 194 BC at its mouth on the south bank by the Romans; it is now about one mile inland. A fort had already been placed there during the Roman siege of Capua to serve, with Puteoli, for the provisioning of the army. Augustus placed a colony of veterans here. The Via Domitiana from Sinuessa to Puteoli crossed the river at this point, and some remains of the bridge are visible. The river was navigable as far as Capua.

In 554, the Byzantine general Narses defeated a Frankish-Alamannic army near this river, during the Gothic War.

Following the invasion of southern Italy by revolutionary forces led by Giuseppe Garibaldi in 1860, Francis II of the Two Sicilies fled from Naples and took up a defensive position on the south bank of the Volturno, near S. Maria di Capua Vetere. The Piedmontese troops and those of Garibaldi inflicted on the Neapolitan forces at the battle of the Volturno, on 1 and 2 October, a defeat which led to the fall of Capua.

The Volturno also gave its name to the Volturno Line, a German defensive position in Italy during World War II.
