= Vastogirardi =

- Comune
- Comune di Vastogirardi
- Location within Italy Location within Molise
- Coordinates: 41°46′N 14°16′E
- Country: Italy
- Region: Molise
- Province: Province of Isernia (IS)
- Frazioni: Villa San Michele, Cerreto

Area
  - Total: 60.9 km^{2} (23.5 sq mi)
- Elevation: 1,200 m (3,900 ft)

Population (Dec. 2004)
  - Total: 789
  - Density: 13.0/km^{2} (33.6/sq mi)
- Time zone: UTC+1 (CET)
  - Summer (DST): UTC+2 (CEST)
- Postal code: 86089
- Dialing code: 0865
- Website: Official website

Vastogirardi is a comune (municipality) in the Province of Isernia in the Italian region Molise, located about 40 kilometres (25 mi) northwest of Campobasso and about 20 kilometres (12 mi) north of Isernia. As of 31 December 2004, it had a population of 789 and an area of 60.9 square kilometres (23.5 mi^{2}).

Vastogirardi borders the following municipalities: Agnone, Capracotta, Carovilli, Castel di Sangro, Forlì del Sannio, Rionero Sannitico, Roccasicura, San Pietro Avellana.

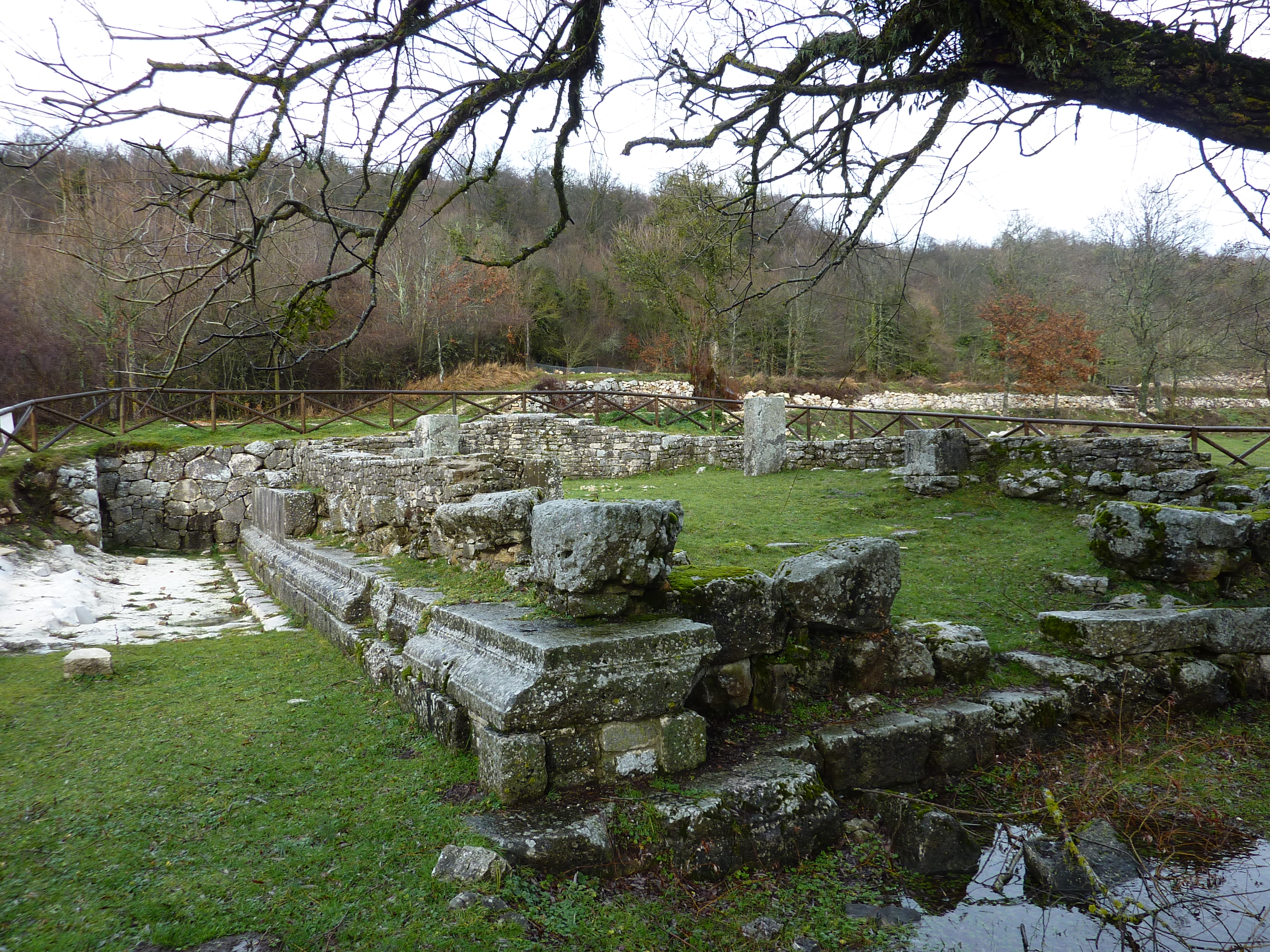
Vastogirardi: Italic temple

== Demographic evolution ==
Historical population

Year	Pop.	±%
1861	2,197	—
1871	2,427	+10.5%
1881	2,523	+4.0%
1901	2,616	+3.7%
1911	2,707	+3.5%

Year	Pop.	±%
1921	2,485	−8.2%
1931	2,055	−17.3%
1936	2,122	+3.3%
1951	2,249	+6.0%
1961	1,928	−14.3%

Year	Pop.	±%
1971	1,348	−30.1%
1981	1,050	−22.1%
1991	864	−17.7%
2001	798	−7.6%

Source: Data from ISTAT
