= Colli a Volturno =

- Comune
- Comune di Colli a Volturno
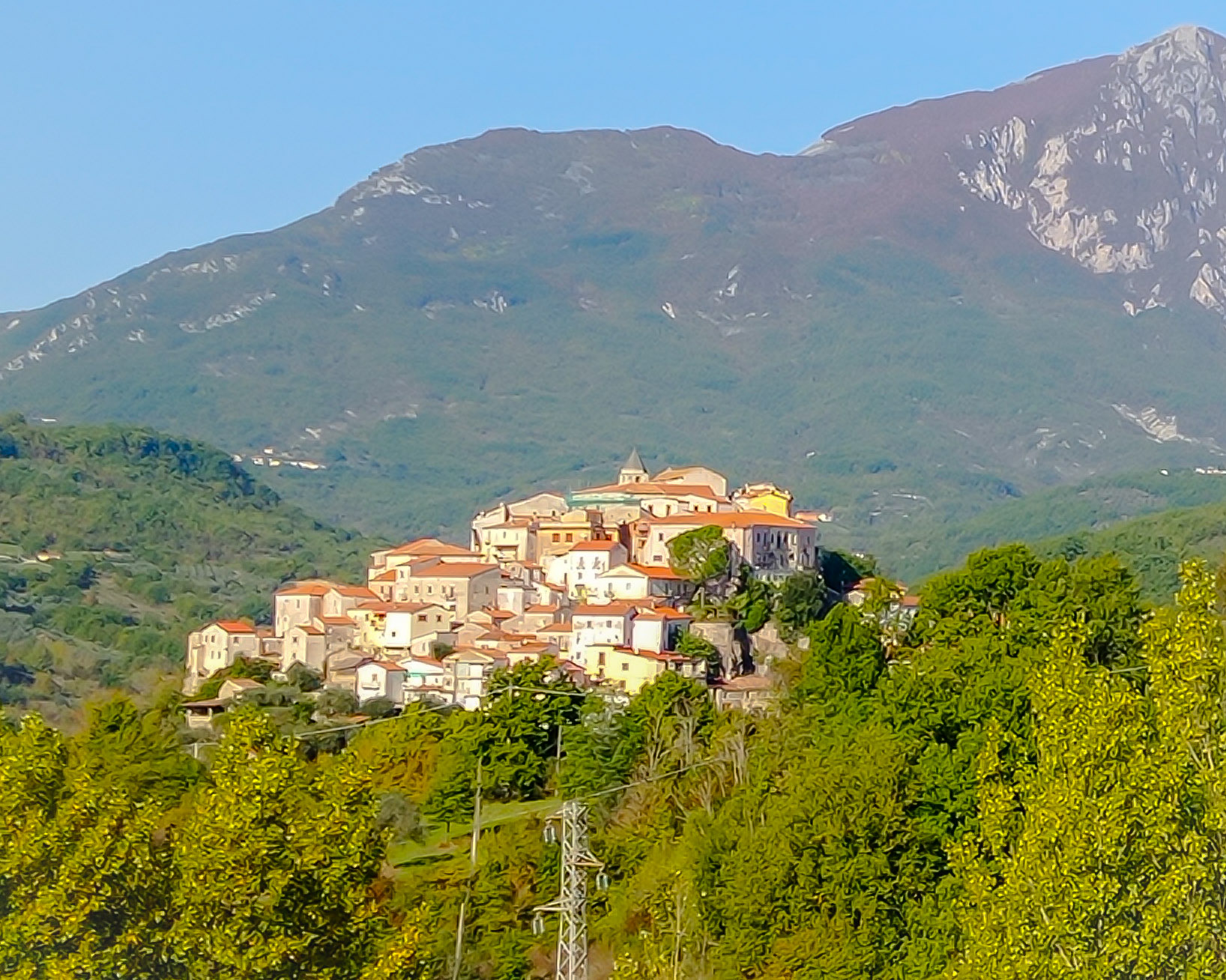
- View of Colli a Volturno

- Coat of arms

- Location within Italy Location within Molise
- Coordinates: 41°36′N 14°6′E
- Country: Italy
- Region: Molise
- Province: Isernia (IS)
- Frazioni: Casali, Castiglioni, Cerreto, Santa Giusta, Valloni

Government
  - Mayor: Emilio Incollingo

Area
  - Total: 25.25 km^{2} (9.75 sq mi)

Population (30 September 2022)
  - Total: 1,277
  - Density: 50.57/km^{2} (131.0/sq mi)
- Demonym: Collesi
- Time zone: UTC+1 (CET)
  - Summer (DST): UTC+2 (CEST)
- Postal code: 86073
- Dialing code: 0865
- Patron saint: Saint Leonard
- Saint day: November 6
- Website: Official website

Colli a Volturno is a comune (municipality) in the Province of Isernia in the Italian region Molise, located about 45 kilometres (28 mi) west of Campobasso and about 11 kilometres (7 mi) west of Isernia.

Colli a Volturno borders the following municipalities: Cerro al Volturno, Filignano, Fornelli, Macchia d'Isernia, Montaquila, Monteroduni, Rocchetta a Volturno, Scapoli.
