= Pozzilli =

- Comune
- Comune di Pozzilli
- Pozzilli within the Province of Isernia

- Location within Italy Location within Molise
- Coordinates: 41°30′44.89″N 14°3′34.78″E
- Country: Italy
- Region: Molise
- Province: Isernia (IS)
- Frazioni: Camerelle, Collegrotte, Leone, Santa Maria Oliveto, Triverno

Government
  - Mayor: Stefania Passarelli

Area
  - Total: 34.66 km^{2} (13.38 sq mi)
- Elevation: 235 m (771 ft)

Population (30 September 2016)
  - Total: 2,342
  - Density: 67.57/km^{2} (175.0/sq mi)
- Demonym: Pozzillesi
- Time zone: UTC+1 (CET)
  - Summer (DST): UTC+2 (CEST)
- Postal code: 86077
- Dialing code: 0865
- Website: Official website

Pozzilli is an Italian comune (municipality) of the Province of Isernia, in the region Molise, located about 50 kilometres (31 mi) west of Campobasso and about 15 kilometres (9 mi) southwest of Isernia.

== Geography ==
Pozzilli is located on a valley below the Mainarde mountain range, next to the Abruzzo, Lazio and Molise National Park. It is crossed by the river Rava and is few km far from the town of Venafro. The industrial area extends into eastern plain and is part of the "Isernia-Venafro Industrial Consortium".

The municipal territory, bordering with the regions of Lazio and Campania, borders with the municipalities of Acquafondata, Capriati a Volturno, Conca Casale, Filignano, Montaquila, Monteroduni, Venafro, and Viticuso.
