= Acquaviva d'Isernia =

- Comune
- Comune di Acquaviva d'Isernia
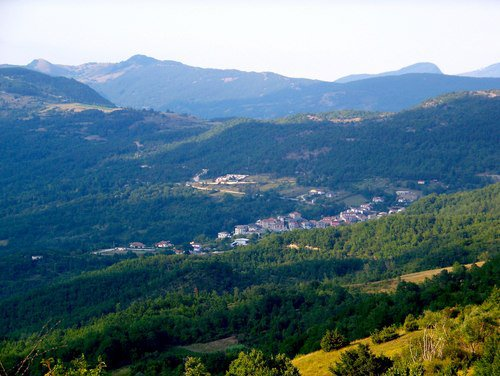
- View of the town, Acquaviva d'Isernia

- Coat of arms

- Location of Acquaviva d'Isernia in Italy Acquaviva d'Isernia (Molise)
- Coordinates: 41°40′N 14°9′E
- Country: Italy
- Region: Molise
- Province: Isernia (IS)

Government
  - Mayor: Francesca Petrocelli

Area
  - Total: 13.51 km^{2} (5.22 sq mi)
- Elevation: 730 m (2,400 ft)

Population (31 December 2017)
  - Total: 413
  - Density: 30.6/km^{2} (79.2/sq mi)
- Demonym: Acquavivani
- Time zone: UTC+1 (CET)
  - Summer (DST): UTC+2 (CEST)
- Postal code: 86080
- Dialing code: 0865
- Website: Official website

Acquaviva d'Isernia is a comune (municipality) in the Province of Isernia in the southern Italian region of Molise, located about 45 kilometres (28 mi) west of Campobasso and about 10 kilometres (6 mi) northwest of Isernia. The town is located in the valley of the Volturno river.
