= Macchia d'Isernia =

- Comune
- Comune di Macchia d'Isernia
- Location within Italy Location within Molise
- Coordinates: 41°34′N 14°10′E
- Country: Italy
- Region: Molise
- Province: Isernia (IS)

Government
  - Mayor: Giovanni Martino

Area
  - Total: 17.71 km^{2} (6.84 sq mi)
- Elevation: 360 m (1,180 ft)

Population (31 August 2022)
  - Total: 1,008
  - Density: 56.92/km^{2} (147.4/sq mi)
- Demonym: Macchiaroli
- Time zone: UTC+1 (CET)
  - Summer (DST): UTC+2 (CEST)
- Postal code: 86070
- Dialing code: 0865
- Website: Official website

Macchia d'Isernia is a comune (municipality) in the Province of Isernia in the Italian region Molise, located about 40 kilometres (25 mi) west of Campobasso and about 7 kilometres (4 mi) southwest of Isernia.

Macchia d'Isernia borders the following municipalities: Colli a Volturno, Fornelli, Isernia, Monteroduni, Sant'Agapito.

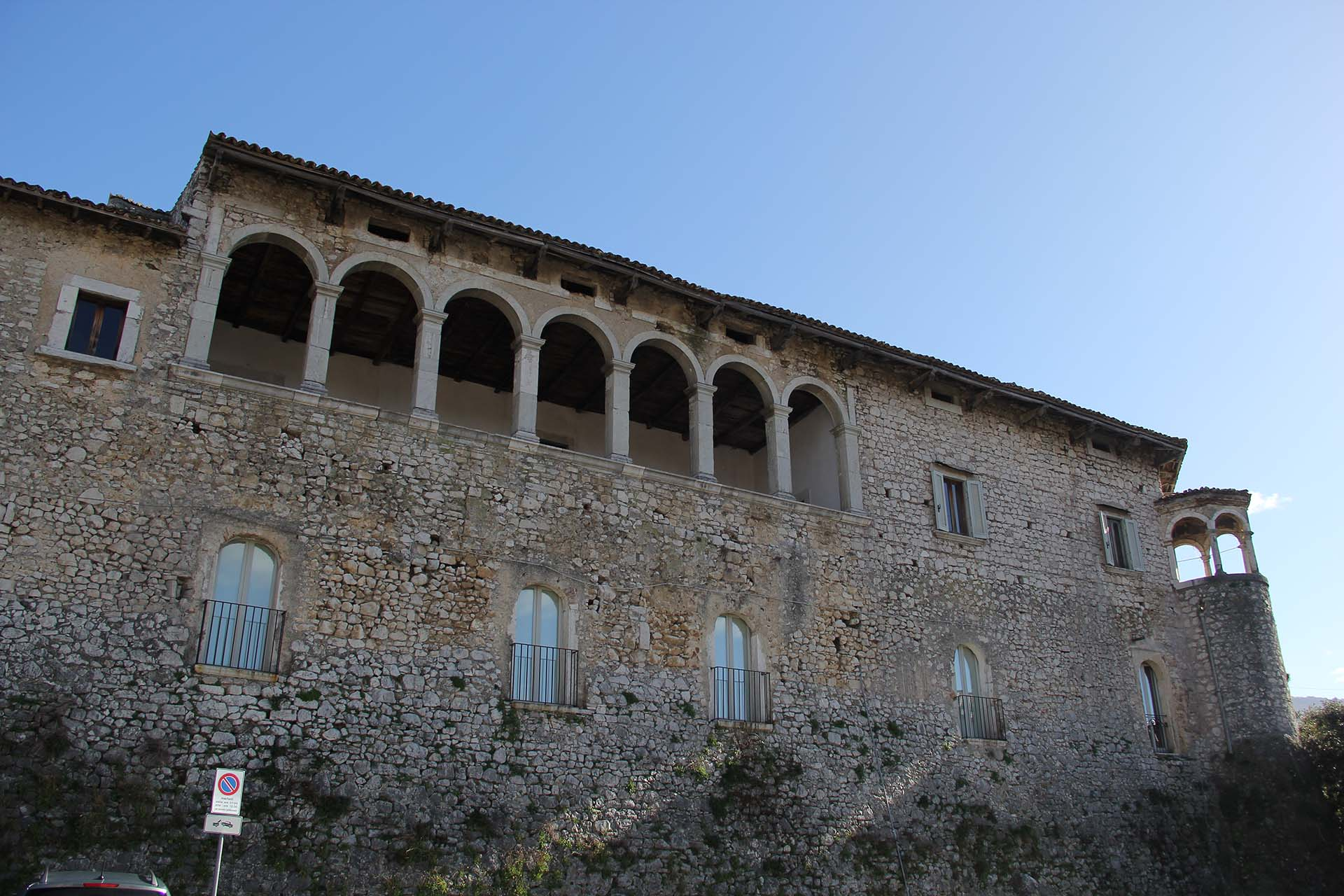
The Palace of the Barons of Macchia d’Isernia
