= Sant'Elena Sannita =

- Comune
- Comune di Sant'Elena Sannita
- Coat of arms

- Location within Italy Location within Molise
- Coordinates: 41°35′N 14°28′E
- Country: Italy
- Region: Molise
- Province: Isernia (IS)

Government
  - Mayor: Nicola Pette

Area
  - Total: 14.1 km^{2} (5.4 sq mi)

Population (Dec. 2004)
  - Total: 282
  - Density: 20.0/km^{2} (51.8/sq mi)
- Time zone: UTC+1 (CET)
  - Summer (DST): UTC+2 (CEST)
- Postal code: 86099
- Dialing code: 0874

Sant'Elena Sannita is a comune (municipality) in the Province of Isernia in the Italian region Molise, located about 15 kilometres (9 mi) west of Campobasso and about 20 kilometres (12 mi) east of Isernia.The settlement was formerly inhabited by an Arbëreshë community, who have since assimilated.

Sant'Elena Sannita borders the following municipalities: Bojano, Casalciprano, Frosolone, Macchiagodena, Spinete.
