= Roccasicura =

- Comune
- Comune di Roccasicura
- Coat of arms

- Location within Italy Location within Molise
- Coordinates: 41°42′N 14°14′E
- Country: Italy
- Region: Molise
- Province: Province of Isernia (IS)

Area
  - Total: 29.0 km^{2} (11.2 sq mi)

Population (Dec. 2004)
  - Total: 610
  - Density: 21/km^{2} (54/sq mi)
- Time zone: UTC+1 (CET)
  - Summer (DST): UTC+2 (CEST)
- Postal code: 86080
- Dialing code: 0865

Roccasicura is a comune (municipality) in the Province of Isernia in the Italian region Molise, located about 40 kilometres (25 mi) northwest of Campobasso and about 11 kilometres (7 mi) north of Isernia. As of 31 December 2004, it had a population of 610 and an area of 29.0 square kilometres (11.2 mi^{2}).

Roccasicura borders the following municipalities: Carovilli, Forlì del Sannio, Isernia, Miranda, Vastogirardi.

== Demographic evolution ==
Historical population

Year	Pop.	±%
1861	1,912	—
1871	1,889	−1.2%
1881	2,003	+6.0%
1901	1,795	−10.4%
1911	1,690	−5.8%

Year	Pop.	±%
1921	1,267	−25.0%
1931	1,152	−9.1%
1936	1,134	−1.6%
1951	1,188	+4.8%
1961	1,111	−6.5%

Year	Pop.	±%
1971	981	−11.7%
1981	765	−22.0%
1991	699	−8.6%
2001	627	−10.3%

Source: Data from ISTAT
