= Pescopennataro =

- Comune
- Comune di Pescopennataro
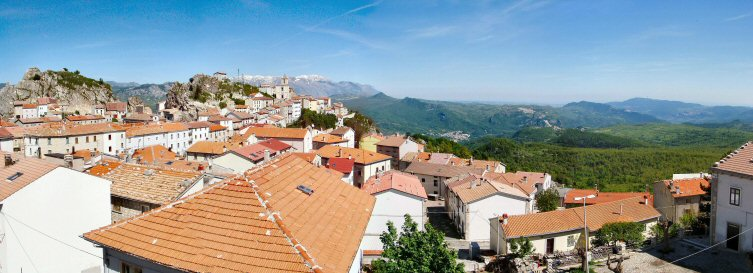
- View of Pescopennataro

- Coat of arms

- Location within Italy Location within Molise
- Coordinates: 41°53′N 14°18′E
- Country: Italy
- Region: Molise
- Province: Isernia (IS)

Government
  - Mayor: Carmen Carfagna

Area
  - Total: 18.84 km^{2} (7.27 sq mi)
- Elevation: 1,190 m (3,900 ft)

Population (31 May 2022)
  - Total: 236
  - Density: 12.5/km^{2} (32.4/sq mi)
- Demonym: Pescolani
- Time zone: UTC+1 (CET)
  - Summer (DST): UTC+2 (CEST)
- Postal code: 86080
- Dialing code: 0865
- Patron saint: St. Roch
- Saint day: 16 August
- Website: Official website

Pescopennataro is a comune (municipality) in the Province of Isernia in the Italian region Molise, located about 45 kilometres (28 mi) northwest of Campobasso and about 30 kilometres (19 mi) north of Isernia.

Pescopennataro borders the following municipalities: Agnone, Borrello, Capracotta, Rosello, Sant'Angelo del Pesco.
