= Castel del Giudice =

- Comune
- Comune di Castel del Giudice
- Location within Italy Location within Molise
- Coordinates: 41°51′N 14°14′E
- Country: Italy
- Region: Molise
- Province: Isernia (IS)

Government
  - Mayor: Lino Nicola Gentile

Area
  - Total: 14.81 km^{2} (5.72 sq mi)
- Elevation: 800 m (2,600 ft)

Population (31 December 2017)
  - Total: 324
  - Density: 21.9/km^{2} (56.7/sq mi)
- Demonym: Castellani
- Time zone: UTC+1 (CET)
  - Summer (DST): UTC+2 (CEST)
- Postal code: 86080
- Dialing code: 0865
- Patron saint: St. Nicholas of Bari
- Saint day: 6 December
- Website: Official website

Castel del Giudice is a comune (municipality) in the Province of Isernia in the Italian region of Molise, located about 50 kilometres (31 mi) northwest of Campobasso and about 30 kilometres (19 mi) north of Isernia.

Castel del Giudice borders the following municipalities: Ateleta, Capracotta, Gamberale, San Pietro Avellana, Sant'Angelo del Pesco.
