= Castel San Vincenzo =

- Comune
- Municipality of Castel San Vincenzo
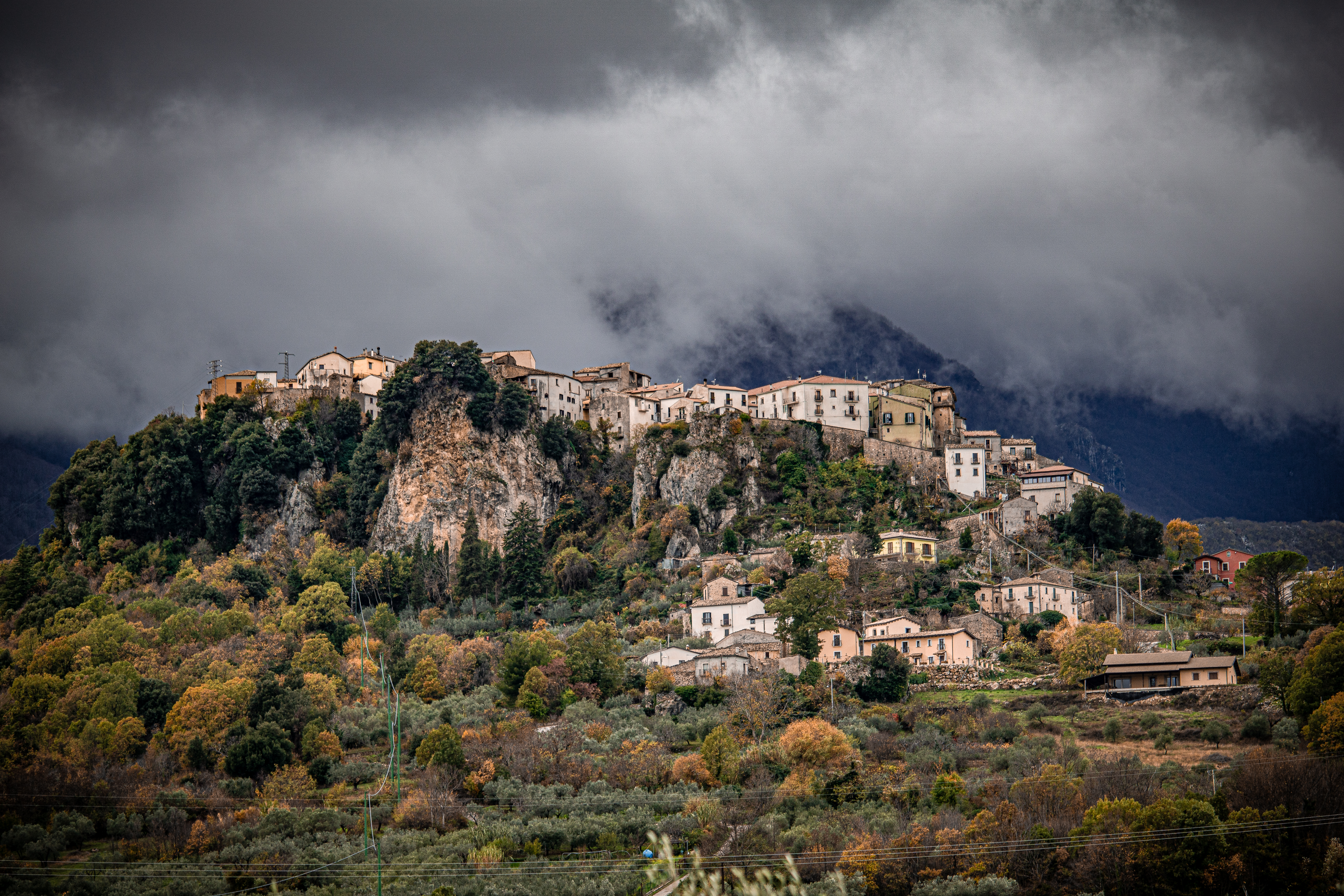
- View of Castel San Vincenzo

- Location within Italy Location within Molise
- Coordinates: 41.65511°N 14.062666°E
- Country: Italy
- Region: Molise
- Province: Isernia (IS)
- Frazioni: Cartiera

Government
  - Mayor: Marisa Margiotta

Area
  - Total: 21.98 km^{2} (8.49 sq mi)
- Elevation: 749 m (2,457 ft)

Population (30 June 2017)
  - Total: 501
  - Density: 22.8/km^{2} (59.0/sq mi)
- Demonym: Castelsanvincenzesi
- Time zone: UTC+1 (CET)
  - Summer (DST): UTC+2 (CEST)
- Postal code: 86071
- Dialing code: 0865
- ISTAT code: 094012
- Patron saint: Martin of Tours
- Saint day: 11th of November
- Website: Official website

Castel San Vincenzo is a comune (municipality) in the Province of Isernia in the Italian region Molise, located about 50 kilometres (31 mi) west of Campobasso and about 15 kilometres (9 mi) northwest of Isernia. The Abbey of San Vincenzo al Volturno is located in its territory. It is also home to an artificial lake, created in the 1950s for a hydroelectric plant.

Castel San Vincenzo borders the following municipalities: Cerro al Volturno, Montenero Val Cocchiara, Pizzone, Rocchetta a Volturno, San Biagio Saracinisco.

== People ==
- Albert N. Gualano
- Sergio Vento
