= Poggio Sannita =

Municipality in Molise, Italy

- Comune
- Comune di Poggio Sannita
- Coat of arms

- Location within Italy Location within Molise
- Coordinates: 41°47′N 14°25′E
- Country: Italy
- Region: Molise
- Province: Isernia (IS)

Government
  - Mayor: Tonino Abate Palomba

Area
  - Total: 21.76 km^{2} (8.40 sq mi)
- Elevation: 705 m (2,313 ft)

Population (31 December 2008)
  - Total: 841
  - Density: 38.6/km^{2} (100/sq mi)
- Demonym: Poggesi
- Time zone: UTC+1 (CET)
  - Summer (DST): UTC+2 (CEST)
- Postal code: 86086
- Dialing code: 0865
- Patron saint: San Prospero
- Saint day: 21 August
- Website: Official website

Poggio Sannita is a comune (municipality) in the Province of Isernia in the Italian region Molise, located about 30 kilometres (19 mi) northwest of Campobasso and about 25 kilometres (16 mi) northeast of Isernia. Poggio Sannita (Caccavone in Poggese) is on a promontory surrounded by the Verrino and Sente rivers, (tributaries of the Trigno river) both mostly torrential in character, especially the latter, which dries up completely during the summer.

== Etymology ==
The town has the special feature of having changed its name in 1922 from the ancient name of Caccavone to the current name Poggio Sannita, which is derived from the ancient Samnite civilization that once populated the area. The previous name probably refers to the fact that in ancient times the town was the site of production of the caccavo, a sort of big pot or pots used by farmers for milk coagulation, that still remains present in the coat of arms of the municipality.

== Geography ==
The village is on a hillside 705 metres (2,313 ft) high and overlooks the valley of Verrino near the natural boundary with Abruzzo. Its territory is between 300 and 767 metres (984 and 2,516 ft) above sea level with an average elevation of 467 metres (1,532 ft). Seismic classification: medium.

== Topography ==
The topography of the area is the result of a development from the southwest to the northeast. The oldest part of town is located in the southern part where later development moved toward the northeast. The shape of the city's contour follows the hillside on which it rests with an elongated inner city. The areas most recent structures are therefore in the northernmost part of the city. In the lower areas and north of the city the so-called PIP, where industrial plants are located.

== Frazionis (localities) ==
The following is the list of localities of the town starting with the most populous:

- Sente

Chocolate

- Valle del Porco
- San Cataldo
- Rimanci
- Quarto II
- Castel di Croce
- Carapellese*
- Scalzavacca*
- Carapellese and Scalzavacca are the subject of a territorial dispute between the municipality of Poggio Sannita and Schiavi di Abruzzo and Civitanova del Sannio.

== History ==
=== Pre-Roman to Medieval ===
The history of the area's pre-Roman originates with the Caraceni shepherds, a subpopulation of the Samnites. It seems that they did head a confederation of Samnite tribes, and are referred to in a shrine located in "Bovianus Vetus" or "Caracenum" at Pietrabbondante. The Oscan language found on archeological remains in the countryside confirms the Samnites being present in Poggio Sannita. In Roman times, it was the seat of military camps and agricultural villas, as evidenced by the discovery of a sword allegedly dating back to Roman-Samnite wars of the 2nd century B.C. The origin of the town name Caccavone came about during the high Middle Ages in the time of Saracen’s invasion between 860 and 900 AD. Several raids by the Saracens brought ruin and devastation to Isernia, Venafro and Bojano. In this era, the inhabitants of the frazioni Casale formed a castle called "Borgo Castello”. In 953, the town was still small and became principles under Beneventan feudal Lords Pandulf II of Benevento and Landulf III of Benevento whose lineage was Lombard. Next to the castle which was the highest hill of the village and residence of feudal lords, a church was built and subsequently developed the district Rinsacca and then the ward door (door of the Castle). The town acquired the appearance of a fortified village, as it was surrounded by thick walls and mighty rock walls, with two entrances to the village: Porto Maddalena site that Poggesi named “mbuorzie", and Castle Gate which is the current arc of the Church of Santa Vittoria. The village grew larger along the circular road surrounding the town itself and formed a series of houses called the Conicella neighborhood, which surrounds the village's oldest castle and the Church. The area remained limited in this area until the 17th century.

=== Feudal era ===
The nobles of Caccavone established a Benedictine monastery on the hill of San Cataldo, with several secondary abbeys in the hills nearby, which is evidenced by some of the graves and tombs. In 740 AD, the Beneventan principle lords Pandulf and Landulf granted the Caccavone fiefdom to Prince Radoisio, son of Count Berardo.

Around the year 1070, the barons of the Kingdom of Naples including Raul De Petra Ugone's son Act, the feudal lord of Caccavone, who had been among those who had followed William the Conqueror to attend a crusade to the Holy Land.

In 1269, in the age of Anjou, Paolo de Giga, soldier, was made Baron of Caccavone by direct investment by Charles I of Anjou. Stefano di Agnone was his successor who would then combines the two castles of Caccavone and Agnone. In 1291, the latter was succeeded by Roland Gisulfo who still maintained the unity of the two castles. The last feudal lord of Caccavone Petra was Charles II who succeeded his father Vincenzo in 1806, the same year in which the King of Naples Joachim Murat, abolished the feudal rights, while retaining the titles.

=== Modern ===
The existence of the “University (town hall or common) of Caccavone” was created in 1704, the same year as a territorial dispute with Agnone. Caccavone resisted legal action against the domination of the Universities of Civitanova del Sannio and Schiavi di Abruzzo which had areas inhabited by Caccavonesi. In 1819, the village of Castelverrino then broke away from the area becoming autonomous (the present town of Castelverrino). A notable day for the area, “Holy Thursday” April 17, 1862 when 42 soldiers and Mayor Pasquale Antinucci fought against a large group of "Chiavone" bandits led by Louis Alonso said in a clash that killed 10 militiamen and the mayor in Salcito. In 1912 and 1913 the municipality approved the resolutions for the return of the district Scalzavacca by the town of Civitanova Carapellese and Schiavi di Abruzzo. In 1914 the Provincial Council of Molise judged the disputed Caccavone Carapellese property of the district, but World War I and other Italian events protracted any attempt to resolve the measure.

== Demographic ==
In the census of 1991 the population was 1,217 inhabitants, ten years later they suffered a decrease of 22.76% to 940, and depopulation is due to the small number of births and a large number of deaths due to a very elderly population. The rate of decrease of the population remains constant, as the area's population fell to 845 units of which 392 males and 453 females, divided in 423 families consisting of an average of 2 components.

== Landmarks ==
Palazzo Ducale

The Ducal Palace was built in the 15th century as the residence of the Dukes of Caccavone and was inhabited until the early 19th century after a restoration occurred in the 18th century. It is called a "Royal Palace" because it seems that a Queen of Bourbon, descent of the Kingdom of the Two Sicilies, may have resided there for a short time. After the city administration's restoration with local stone, it reopened to the public in 1994. It currently houses the town library and a permanent photo exhibition on the third floor and the office of civil protection.

Church of Santa Vittoria

The Church of Santa Vittoria is the mother Catholic Church of the area, placed in the center of the medieval village, although it is not the original building. The Church has three asymmetric cruise naves resting on a base rock. The current plan of the church, raised, covered the ossuary, where presumably the Dukes of Caccavone are buried. Notable artwork and craftsmanship in the church are the paintings of the Souls in Purgatory, the Last Supper and St. Anthony Abbot, the reliquary and the urn with a bone of the arm of San Prospero, the patron saint of Poggio, the organ of 1769, the pulpit, the altar, the font and the statue of San Prospero of 1764.

Church of San Rocco

The Church of San Rocco is the second church dedicated to San Rocco in the village. The decorations of the altar are dedicated to the saint of the late Baroque. The structure of the church dates from the late 7th century.

Church of the Madonna delle Grazie

Located outside the village, the church was built around 1590. It functioned as the main church for 5 years due to the collapse of the Cathedral from an earthquake that shook the Roman Catholic Diocese of Trivento.

Piazza XVII Aprile

The square in the center of the town is the main venue of Poggio Sannita. There is a fountain with a nearby village green. It takes its name from the date of death of 10 Poggesi citizens (including the mayor) who battled bandits in 1862. A short walk from the square, there is a monument to the fallen on a slab of stone with the names of Poggesi citizens killed in wars with an original cannon written on it.

Belvedere "Colle Calvario"

Colle Calvario is the headquarters of the municipal gardens and the highest point in town. It is a hangout for young people with a wide view of the Verrino Valley.

Belvedere "Ara Giagnagnera"

The Belvedere "Ara Giagnagnera" is a garden that provides wide views of Agnone to Castelverrino.

Area attrezzata di Quarto II

Natural oasis in the valley of Verrino equipped for camping.

== Culture ==
=== Events ===
March 25, Our Lady of Grace, Holy Mass, procession and fireworks. 1st Sunday of June, Saint Lucia, Mass, procession, fireworks and festivity to the streets. July 2, Feast of Our Lady of Grace, Holy Mass, procession, fireworks and street festival. August 16, San Rocco, much revered by Poggesi, Mass and popular games. August 17, San Cataldo, Mass, procession, fireworks, display of local products and great party in the district of the same name. August 21, San Prospero, patron Holy Mass, procession, fireworks. August 22, San Rocco, Mass, procession, fireworks and street festival. September 13, Dedication of the Mother Church. Last Saturday in September, San Domenico, much revered by Poggesi, Mass, procession, fireworks and. Last Sunday in September, Madonna delle Grazie, Mass, procession, fireworks and street festival. December 23, Santa Vittoria, much venerated by Poggesi, mass.

=== Exhibitions ===
On the third floor of the Palazzo Ducale is a permanent photographic exhibition on the theme: "Poggio Sannita: the places and people" with many period and recent photographs.

=== Sports ===
Poggese sports focuses mainly on soccer and tennis. Every summer the big sporting event is the neighborhood soccer tournament; pits four teams representing precisely the opposite quarters of the town namely: Santa Vittoria or "Conicella”, Santa Maria, and" Plaza ", San Rocco and Saint Lucia or "Mill" title holder. Teams are formed by residents by their location in the city.

The recently built sports facility for the town houses a soccer field with artificial grass, lighting and grandstands, and a tennis court equipped with individual seats

=== Gastronomy ===
Local products include the area's high quality olive oil for which the municipality has joined the consortium "La città dell'olio"; wine (until recently celebrated in a Festival of Grapes), honey handcrafted by some Poggesi, and in recent years a considerable collection of truffles.

The typical dishes of the area are represented by means le sagne a pezzate (lasagna), cavati (gnocchi), the cic lievt (typical pasta dough), the palette cheese and eggs (eggs and cheese balls) and magliatiell ( roulade of lamb) as well as various quality sausages.

== Notable residents ==
- Maria De Cosmo Horatiis, the most eminent surgeon in southern Italy in the first half of the 1800s.
