= Longano =

- Comune
- Comune di Longano
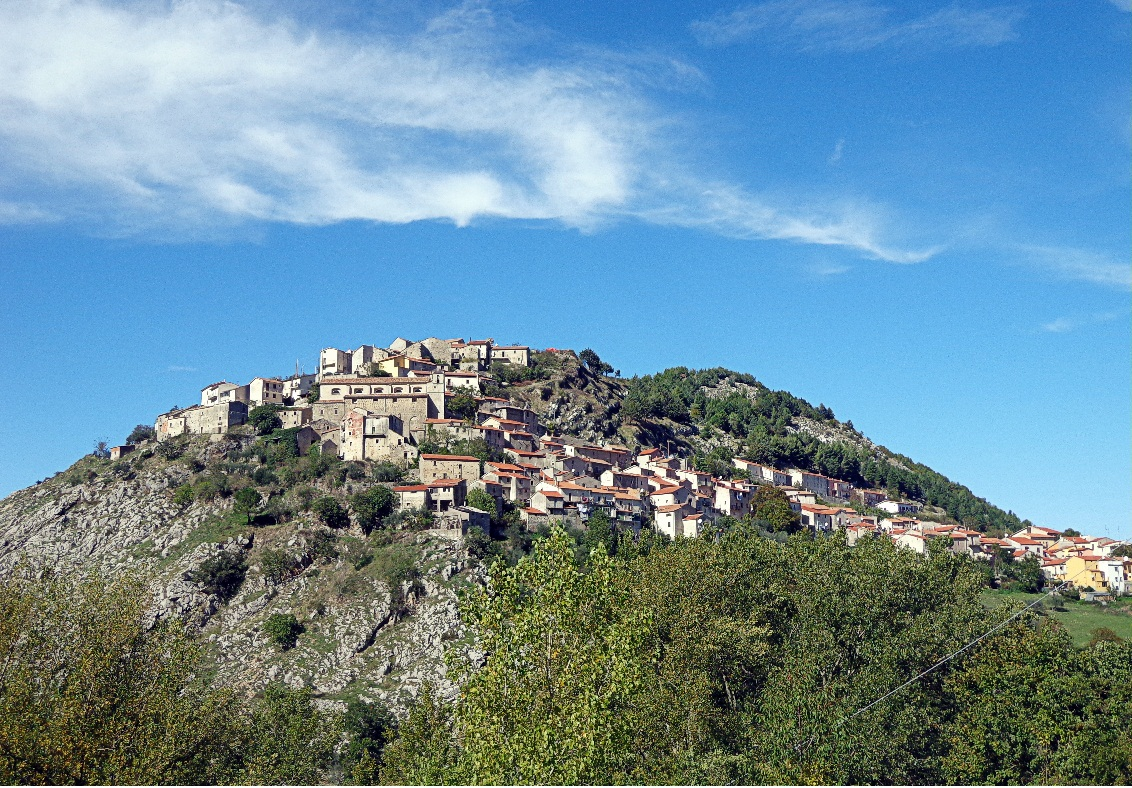
- View of Longano

- Location within Italy Location within Molise
- Coordinates: 41°31′N 14°15′E
- Country: Italy
- Region: Molise
- Province: Province of Isernia (IS)

Government
  - Mayor: Cristian Domenico Sellecchia

Area
  - Total: 27.1 km^{2} (10.5 sq mi)
- Elevation: 680 m (2,230 ft)

Population (Dec. 2025)
  - Total: 619
  - Density: 22.8/km^{2} (59.2/sq mi)
- Demonym: longanesi
- Time zone: UTC+1 (CET)
  - Summer (DST): UTC+2 (CEST)
- Postal code: 86090
- Dialing code: 0865
- ISTAT code: 094024
- Patron saint: Anthony of Padua
- Saint day: 13 June
- Website: http://www.comune.longano.is.it/

Longano is a comune (municipality) in the Province of Isernia in the Italian region of Molise, located about 35 kilometres (22 mi) west of Campobasso and about 9 kilometres (6 mi) south of Isernia. As of 31 December 2025, it had a population of 619 and an area of 27.1 square kilometres (10.5 mi^{2}).

Longano borders the following municipalities: Castelpizzuto, Gallo Matese, Isernia, Monteroduni, Pettoranello del Molise, Roccamandolfi, Sant'Agapito.

== Demographic evolution ==
Historical population

Year	Pop.	±%
1861	1,443	—
1871	1,390	−3.7%
1881	1,447	+4.1%
1901	1,675	+15.8%
1911	1,489	−11.1%

Year	Pop.	±%
1921	1,390	−6.6%
1931	1,268	−8.8%
1936	1,355	+6.9%
1951	1,488	+9.8%
1961	1,314	−11.7%

Year	Pop.	±%
1971	1,107	−15.8%
1981	1,012	−8.6%
1991	811	−19.9%
2001	725	−10.6%

Source: Data from ISTAT
