= Rocchetta a Volturno =

- Comune
- Comune di Rocchetta a Volturno
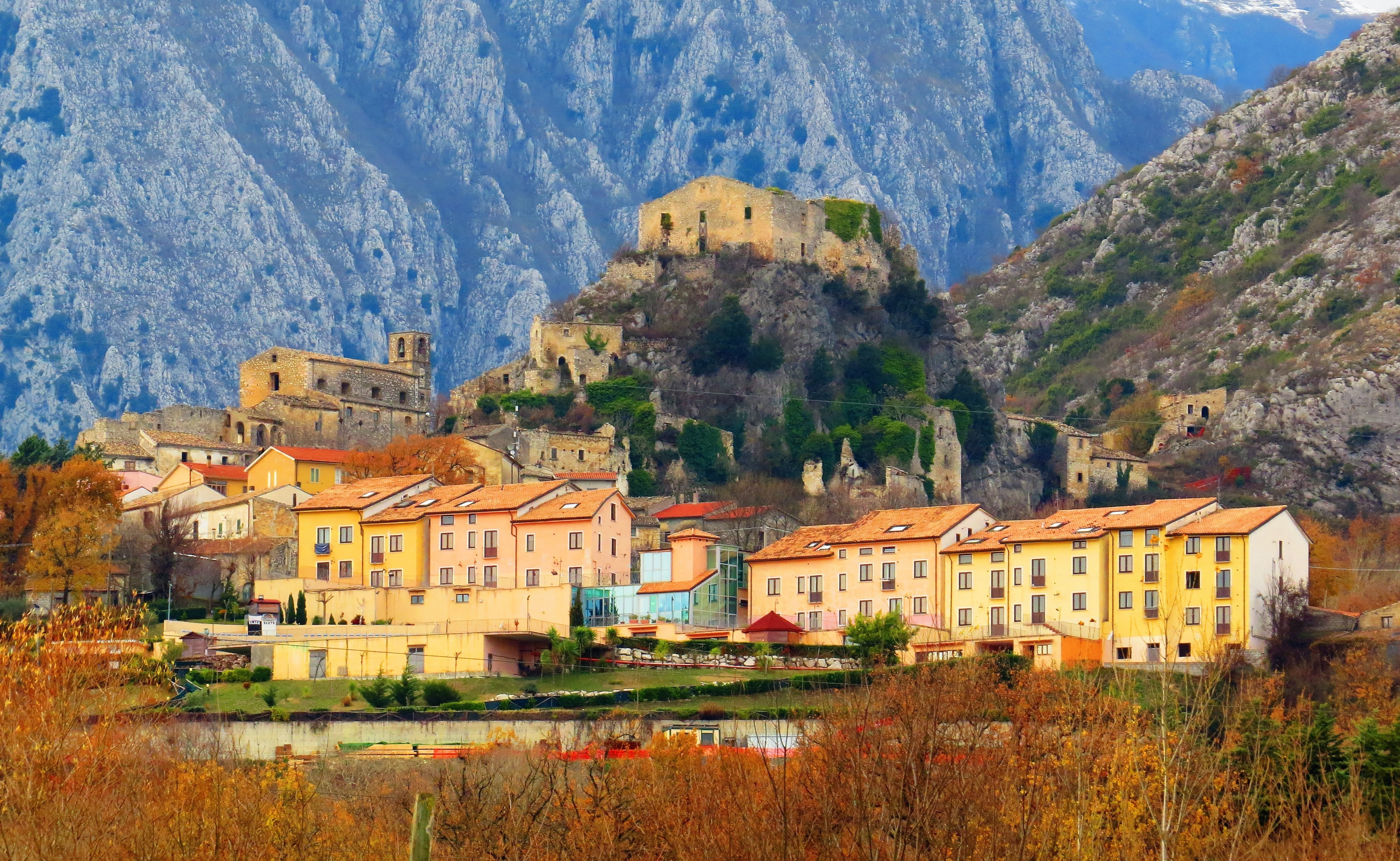
- View of Rocchetta

- Location within Italy Location within Molise
- Coordinates: 41°37′N 14°5′E
- Country: Italy
- Region: Molise
- Province: Isernia (IS)

Government
  - Mayor: Teodoro Santilli

Area
  - Total: 23.34 km^{2} (9.01 sq mi)
- Elevation: 540 m (1,770 ft)

Population (30 September 2016)
  - Total: 1,105
  - Density: 47.34/km^{2} (122.6/sq mi)
- Demonym: Rocchettani
- Time zone: UTC+1 (CET)
  - Summer (DST): UTC+2 (CEST)
- Postal code: 86070
- Dialing code: 0865
- Website: Official website

Rocchetta a Volturno is a comune (municipality) in the Province of Isernia in the Italian region Molise, located about 50 kilometres (31 mi) west of Campobasso and about 13 kilometres (8 mi) west of Isernia.

Rocchetta a Volturno borders the following municipalities: Castel San Vincenzo, Cerro al Volturno, Colli a Volturno, Filignano, San Biagio Saracinisco, Scapoli, Vallerotonda.

The village contains two main settlements. The older part, called Rocchetta Alta, lies on the top of a rocky hill that dominates the valley. The old town is deserted since the end of the 20th century. The new town is at the bottom of the hill, in the valley.

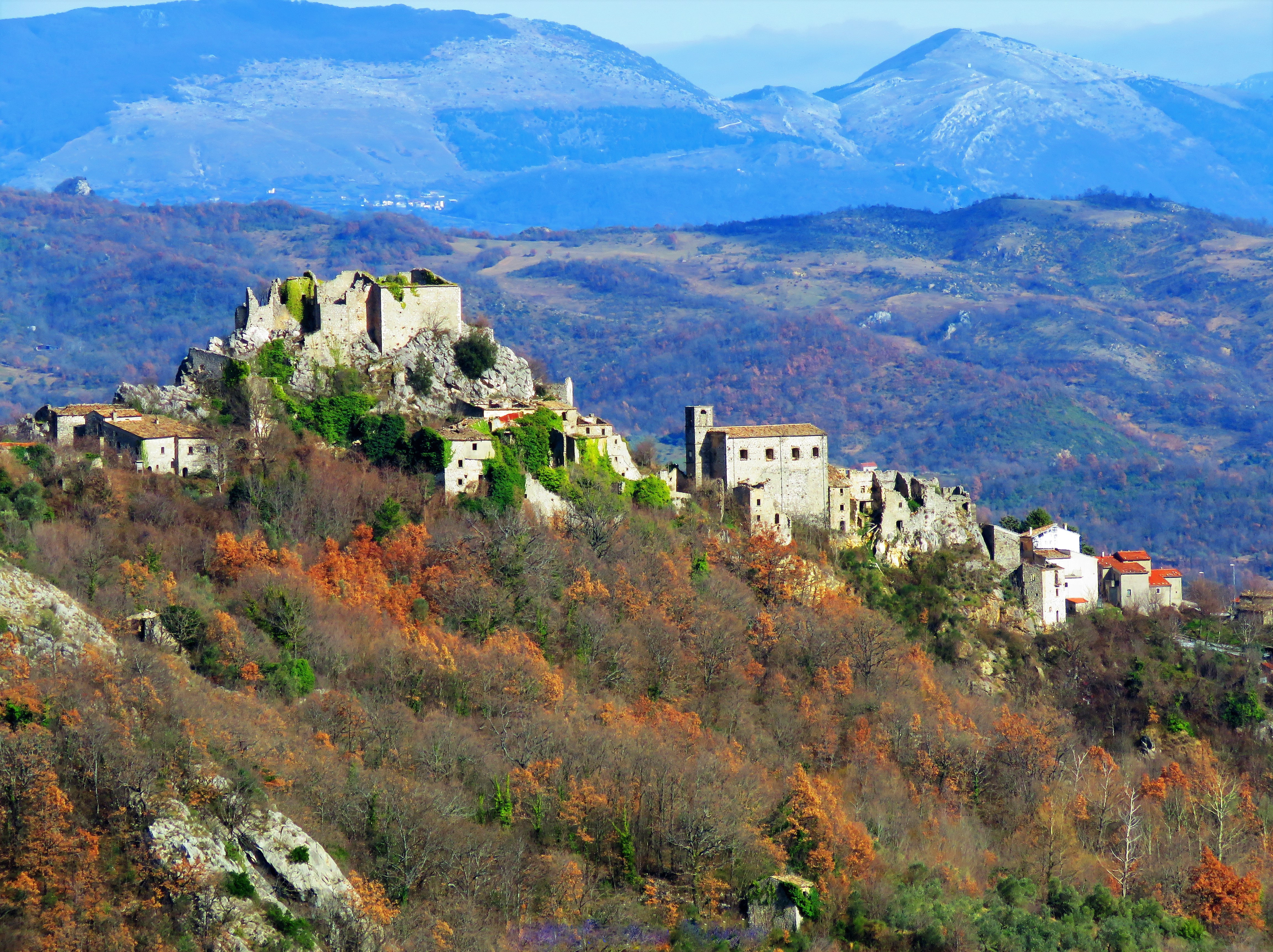
Rocchetta Alta
