= Province of Isernia =

Province of Italy

Coordinates: 41°39′N 14°16′E

Province of Isernia Provincia di Isernia (Italian)
- Province
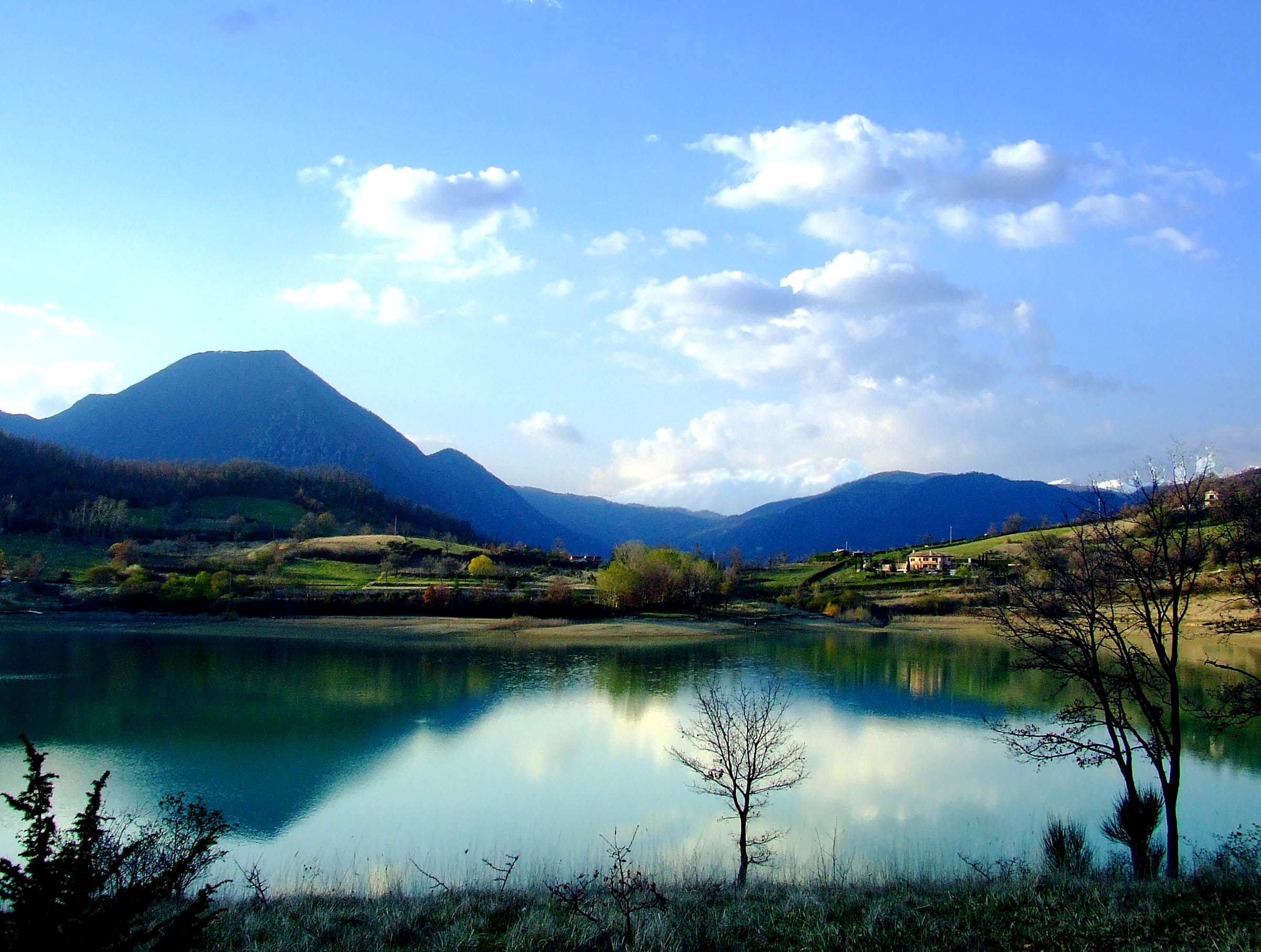
- Lake of Castel San Vincenzo

- Flag Coat of arms

- Location of the province of Isernia in Italy
- Country: Italy
- Region: Molise
- Capital(s): Isernia
- Municipalities: 52

Government
  - President: Daniele Saia

Area
  - Total: 1,535.24 km^{2} (592.76 sq mi)

Population (2026)
  - Total: 78,217
  - Density: 50.948/km^{2} (131.95/sq mi)

GDP
  - Total: €1.663 billion (2015)
  - Per capita: €19,199 (2015)
- Time zone: UTC+1 (CET)
  - Summer (DST): UTC+2 (CEST)
- Postal code: 86070-86071, 86073-86080, 86082-86099, 86170
- Telephone prefix: 086, 0865, 0874
- Vehicle registration: IS
- ISTAT code: 094

The Province of Isernia (Italian: provincia di Isernia) is a province in the region of Molise in southern Italy. The provincial capital is the city of Isernia and the president of the province is Alfredo Ricci.

The province has a population of 78,217 in an area of 1,535.24 square kilometres (592.76 sq mi) across its 52 municipalities.

== History ==
Isernia was known as Samnite Aesernia until it fell under Roman rule in 263 BC. The territory was later given to Alczeco for his efforts against the Byzantines with his Bulgarian military, by the Duchy of Benevento; most of this territory became Molise County. Throughout the 9th century the area was repeatedly sacked during Muslim invasions and suffered an earthquake in 847; these destroyed the cities of Isernia and Venafro. Despite this, the city was made an episcopal see and was granted the status of county in 964. A 1979 archaeological discovery near the city of Isernia found evidence of a settlement dating back to the Palaeolithic period over 736,000 years ago.

In Molise County, Benedictines formed the San Vincenzo al Volturno monastery in the province of Isernia after Rome fell in 476. When the area was invaded by the Muslims, 500 to 900 monks were decapitated by them and many were taken as slaves; despite this, the monastery continued to function and reached its peak size during the eleventh and twelfth centuries. Pope Celestine V was born near Isernia and the province's feast day is on 19 May, the date Celestine V was canonized. An earthquake in 1805 destroyed Isernia's cathedral, which was rebuilt atop the ruins of the destroyed structure in 1837.

The province gained attention during the COVID-19 pandemic in Italy, as by 15 March it was the only one of Italy's 110 provinces to not have a single confirmed case of the COVID-19 virus.

== Geography ==
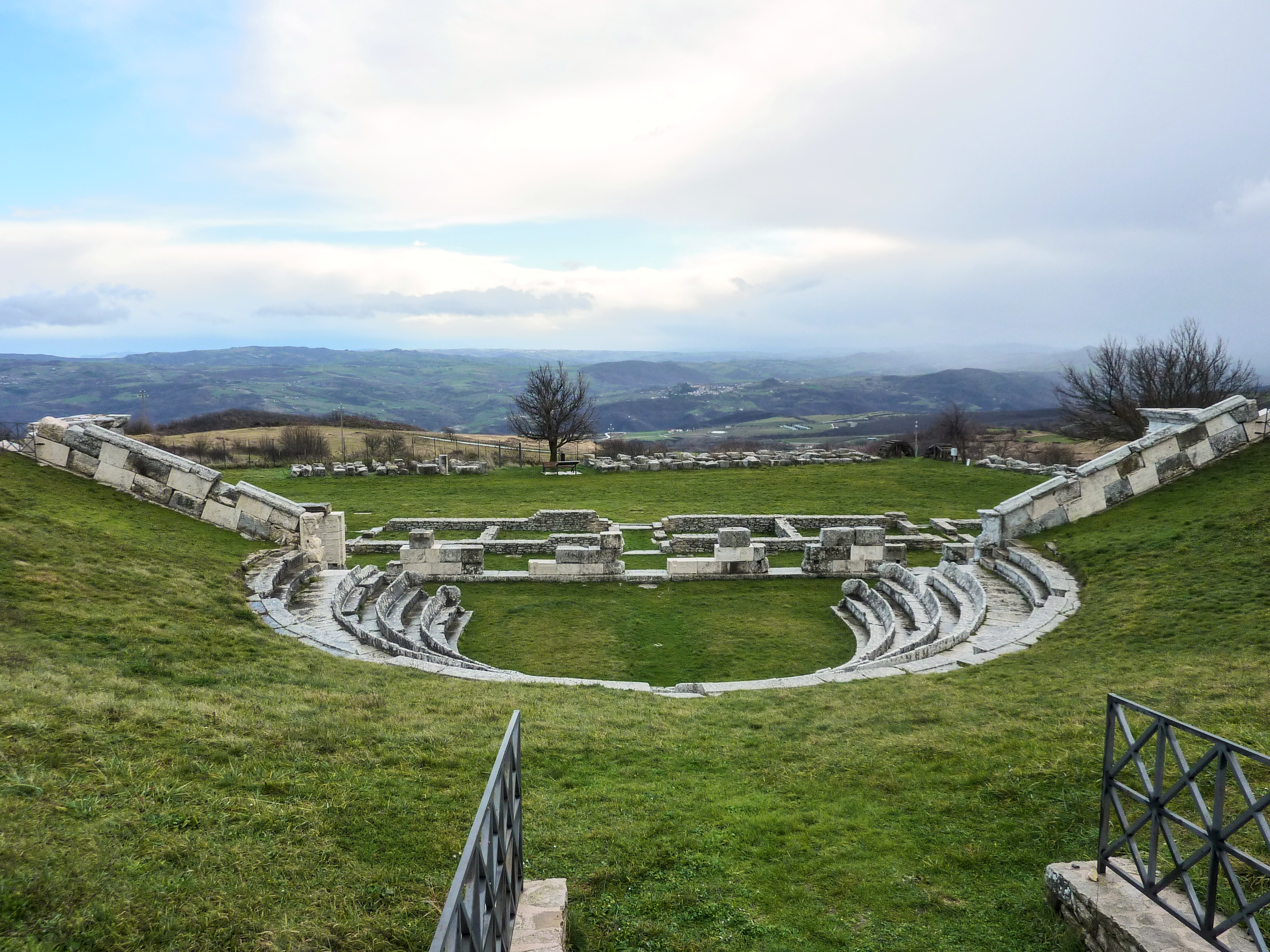
The Samnite amphitheatre of Pietrabbondante

The province of Isernia is a largely mountainous area of Southern Italy, part of the region of Molise. To the southwest the mountains decrease in height and the wooded hills give way to the plains around Venafro. To the northeast is the province of Campobasso, also part of Molise, and to the north the provinces of L'Aquila and Chieti, both in the region of Abruzzo. To the west is the province of Frosinone in Lazio and to the south the province of Caserta in Campania.

There are four mountain ranges in the province and the Abruzzo National Park straddles the border with Abruzzo. The highest peak in the province is Monte Mare, 2,020 metres (6,627 ft). The main rivers are the Volturno which flows into the Tyrrhenian and the Trigno which flows into the Adriatic. The lake of Castel San Vincenzo is a man-made reservoir built to power a hydroelectric scheme.

The economy of the region has been traditionally based on agriculture. The holdings are mostly small and produce grapes, cereals, olives, vegetables, fruit and dairy products. Traditional products grown in the province include grass peas (Lathyrus sativus) and farro, which is made from a specialist form of wheat. Tintilia grapes are grown for the production of the region's red wine, the "Tintilia del Molise".

== Government ==
=== Municipalities ===
The province has 52 municipalities:

- Acquaviva d'Isernia
- Agnone
- Bagnoli del Trigno
- Belmonte del Sannio
- Cantalupo nel Sannio
- Capracotta
- Carovilli
- Carpinone
- Castel del Giudice
- Castel San Vincenzo
- Castelpetroso
- Castelpizzuto
- Castelverrino
- Cerro al Volturno
- Chiauci
- Civitanova del Sannio
- Colli a Volturno
- Conca Casale
- Filignano
- Forlì del Sannio
- Fornelli
- Frosolone
- Isernia
- Longano
- Macchia d'Isernia
- Macchiagodena
- Miranda
- Montaquila
- Montenero Val Cocchiara
- Monteroduni
- Pesche
- Pescolanciano
- Pescopennataro
- Pettoranello del Molise
- Pietrabbondante
- Pizzone
- Poggio Sannita
- Pozzilli
- Rionero Sannitico
- Roccamandolfi
- Roccasicura
- Rocchetta a Volturno
- San Pietro Avellana
- Sant'Agapito
- Sant'Angelo del Pesco
- Sant'Elena Sannita
- Santa Maria del Molise
- Scapoli
- Sessano del Molise
- Sesto Campano
- Vastogirardi
- Venafro

== Demographics ==
As of 2026, the population is 78,217, of which 50.1% are male, and 49.9% are female. Minors make up 12.8% of the population, and seniors make up 28.5%.

Historical population

Year	Pop.	±%
1861	125,745	—
1871	133,784	+6.4%
1881	130,396	−2.5%
1901	132,524	+1.6%
1911	130,904	−1.2%
1921	129,080	−1.4%
1931	116,547	−9.7%
1936	117,304	+0.6%

Year	Pop.	±%
1951	117,246	−0.0%
1961	105,801	−9.8%
1971	92,166	−12.9%
1981	92,524	+0.4%
1991	91,942	−0.6%
2001	89,852	−2.3%
2011	87,241	−2.9%
2021	80,564	−7.7%

Source: ISTAT

=== Immigration ===
As of 2025, immigrants make up 9.1% of the population. The 5 largest foreign countries of birth are Switzerland, Romania, Morocco, Germany, and Argentina.
