= San Pietro Avellana =

- Comune
- Comune di San Pietro Avellana
- Location within Italy Location within Molise
- Coordinates: 41°47′N 14°10′E
- Country: Italy
- Region: Molise
- Province: Province of Isernia (IS)
- Frazioni: Masserie di Cristo

Area
  - Total: 45.0 km^{2} (17.4 sq mi)
- Elevation: 960 m (3,150 ft)

Population (Dec. 2004)
  - Total: 630
  - Density: 14/km^{2} (36/sq mi)
- Demonym: Sampietresi
- Time zone: UTC+1 (CET)
  - Summer (DST): UTC+2 (CEST)
- Postal code: 86088
- Dialing code: 0865
- Website: Official website

San Pietro Avellana is a comune (municipality) in the Province of Isernia in the Italian region of Molise, about 50 kilometres (31 mi) northwest of Campobasso and some 20 kilometres (12 mi) north of Isernia. As of 31 December 2004, it had a population of 630 and an area of 45.0 square kilometres (17.4 mi^{2}).

== History ==
In 1026, Dominic of Sora established the monastery of San Pietro Avellano, at the instigation of Count Oderisio Borello, and a village began to form nearby. In 1069, the monastery was ceded to Monte Cassino. The abbots fortified the village to stop its plundering by local counts. The abbey at San Pietro Avellano was abandoned after a devastating earthquake in 1441, but the village remained an ecclesiastical dependency of Monte Cassino until 1785.

The municipality of San Pietro Avellana contains the frazione (subdivision) Masserie di Cristo. San Pietro Avellana borders municipalities Ateleta, Capracotta, Castel del Giudice, Castel di Sangro, Roccaraso and Vastogirardi.

Many descendants of the original San Pietro Avellana, a village with a population well over 2,000, live in the Cleveland, Pittsburgh, and Youngstown areas in the United States. They have spread out all across the globe, from Rock Springs, Wyoming, to Argentina, to northern New Jersey, and back to northern Italy's Industrial Triangle. In 1906 a new shrine to Saint Amico was constructed through donations from former residents who had emigrated from San Pietro Avellano.

== Saint Amico ==
The patron saint of San Pietro Avellana is a saint whose remains rest on hillside in the woods, overlooking the village where he worked. In local dialect, or dialetto sampietrese, Saint Amico is called Sand'Amig.

Two vitae are published in the Ata Sanctorum. He came of a good family of the neighborhood of Camerino, and was a secular priest in that town. Then he became a hermit and afterwards a monk, his example inducing, it is said, his father and mother, brothers and nephews also to embrace the religious life. But St Amicus found the discipline of his monastery insufficiently austere, and he again became a solitary, this time in the Abruzzi. He lived here completely alone for three years, when disciples began to gather round him. On one occasion he miraculously relieved a famine".

The last years of his life were passed at the monastery at San Pietro Avellano, where he died around 1045.

The shrine of Sant'Amico is referred to as Il Bosco di Sant'Amico.

This Amico should not be confused with the Cistercian Saint Amico of the Abbey of Santa Maria Rambona in the province of Macerata.

== Sport ==
San Pietro Avellana has a soccer team called "ASD San Pietro Avellana."

== Population change ==
Historical population

Year	Pop.	±%
1861	2,074	—
1871	2,250	+8.5%
1881	2,472	+9.9%
1901	2,622	+6.1%
1911	2,532	−3.4%

Year	Pop.	±%
1921	2,945	+16.3%
1931	1,939	−34.2%
1936	2,065	+6.5%
1951	1,688	−18.3%
1961	1,503	−11.0%

Year	Pop.	±%
1971	998	−33.6%
1981	791	−20.7%
1991	726	−8.2%
2001	662	−8.8%

Source: Data from ISTAT
