= Cantalupo nel Sannio =

- Comune
- Comune di Cantalupo nel Sannio
- Coat of arms

- Location within Italy Location within Molise
- Coordinates: 41°31′N 14°40′E
- Country: Italy
- Region: Molise
- Province: Isernia (IS)

Government
  - Mayor: Achille Caranci

Area
  - Total: 15.64 km^{2} (6.04 sq mi)
- Elevation: 587 m (1,926 ft)

Population (31 December 2017)
  - Total: 764
  - Density: 48.8/km^{2} (127/sq mi)
- Demonym: Cantalupesi
- Time zone: UTC+1 (CET)
  - Summer (DST): UTC+2 (CEST)
- Postal code: 86092
- Dialing code: 0865
- Patron saint: St. Anne
- Saint day: July 26
- Website: Official website

Cantalupo nel Sannio is a town and comune in the province of Isernia, in the Molise region of southern Italy.

== History ==
The town was known simply as Cantalupo until February 4, 1864, when the denomination nel Sannio was added in order to differentiate it from other villages with the same name. The specification of nel Sannio is derived from the fact that the village is located in the ancient territory of Samnium, which was inhabited by the Italic tribes known as the Samnites. The name Cantalupo is thought either to derive from the Greek "Kata-Lupon", meaning "in the middle of the woods", or from the Bulgarian "Kan-Teleped", meaning "chief residence". The latter explanation is favoured due to the well-established Bulgar presence in the territory of Samnium going back at least to the 7th century.

Many Cantalupo's inhabitants emigrated to North America, Australia, South America, and other places following both the Great War and World War II. A substantial population of Cantalupesi settled in Montreal, Quebec, Canada and Anaconda, Montana, United States, where they founded and still maintain the Associazione di Sant'Anna di Cantalupo, named in honour of the village's patron saint, Saint Anne, Christ's maternal grandmother. She became Cantalupo's patron following an earthquake on July 26, 1805 (which is the feast day of Saint Anne), that miraculously ended when the Saint's statue was taken out of the village church of San Salvatore.
