= Belmonte del Sannio =

- Comune
- Comune di Belmonte del Sannio
- Coat of arms

- Location within Italy Location within Molise
- Coordinates: 41°49′N 14°25′E
- Country: Italy
- Region: Molise
- Province: Isernia (IS)

Government
  - Mayor: Errico Borrelli

Area
  - Total: 20.32 km^{2} (7.85 sq mi)
- Elevation: 864 m (2,835 ft)

Population (31 December 2017)
  - Total: 735
  - Density: 36.2/km^{2} (93.7/sq mi)
- Demonym: Belmontesi
- Time zone: UTC+1 (CET)
  - Summer (DST): UTC+2 (CEST)
- Postal code: 86080
- Dialing code: 0865
- Website: Official website

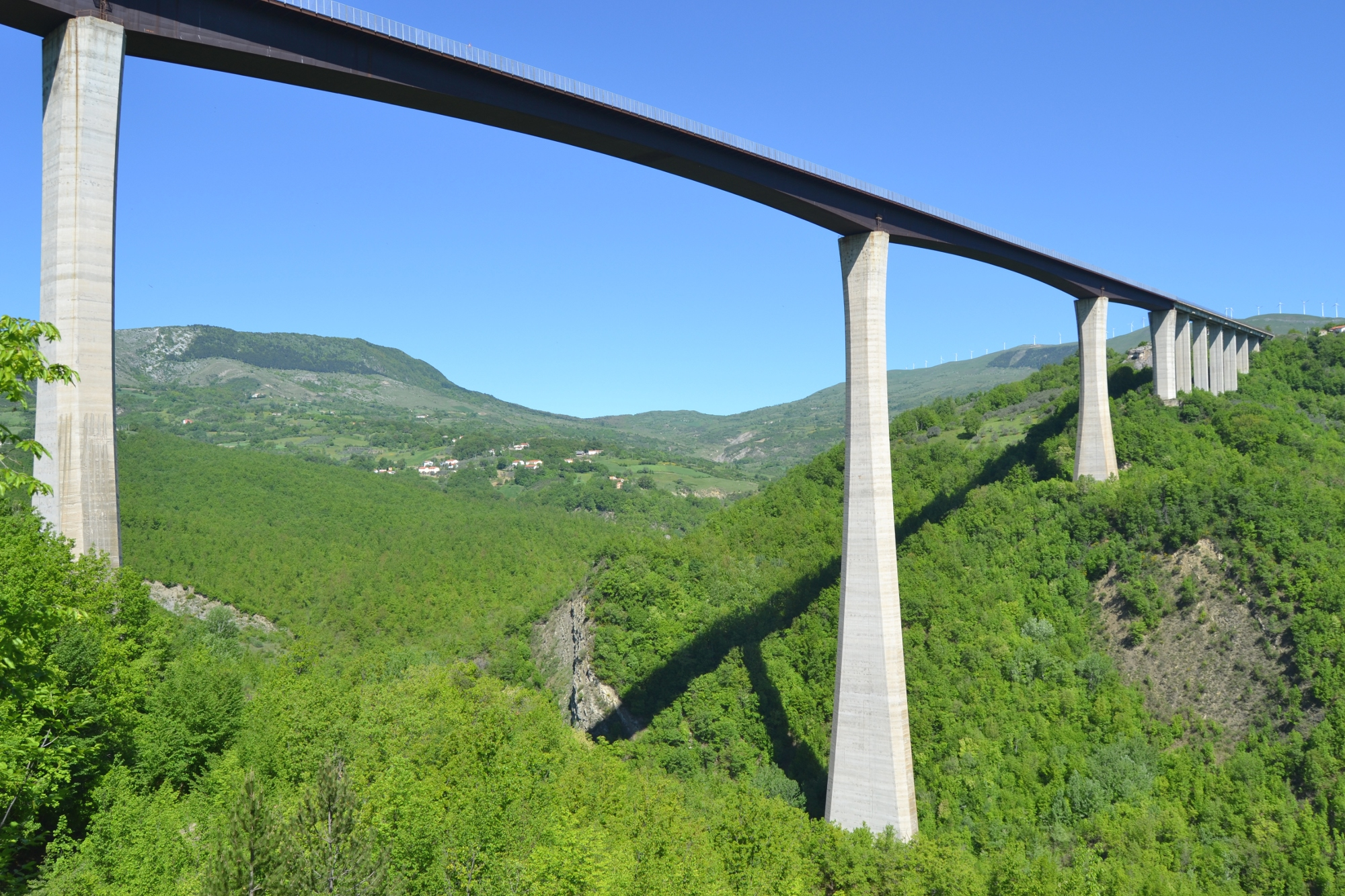
The Sente Viaduct spanning the green valley between Belmonte del Sannio and Castiglione Messer Marino

Belmonte del Sannio is a comune (municipality) in the Province of Isernia in the Italian region Molise, located about 35 kilometres (22 mi) northwest of Campobasso and about 30 kilometres (19 mi) northeast of Isernia.

Belmonte del Sannio borders the following municipalities: Agnone, Castiglione Messer Marino, Schiavi di Abruzzo.
