= Miranda, Molise =

Miranda
- Comune
- Comune di Miranda
- Location of the village of Miranda within the province of Isernia

- Location within Italy Location within Molise
- Coordinates: 41°39′N 14°15′E
- Country: Italy
- Region: Molise
- Province: Province of Isernia (IS)

Area
  - Total: 22.3 km^{2} (8.6 sq mi)

Population (Dec. 2004)
  - Total: 1,065
  - Density: 47.8/km^{2} (124/sq mi)
- Time zone: UTC+1 (CET)
  - Summer (DST): UTC+2 (CEST)
- Postal code: 86080
- Dialing code: 0865

Miranda is a comune (municipality) in the Province of Isernia in the Italian region Molise, located about 35 kilometres (22 mi) northwest of Campobasso and about 6 kilometres (4 mi) north of Isernia. As of 31 December 2004, it had a population of 1,065 and an area of 22.3 square kilometres (8.6 mi^{2}).

Miranda borders the following municipalities: Carovilli, Isernia, Pesche, Pescolanciano, Roccasicura, Sessano del Molise.

== Demographic evolution ==
Historical population
Year	Pop.	±%
1861	2,129	—
1871	2,078	−2.4%
1881	2,018	−2.9%
1901	2,003	−0.7%
1911	1,995	−0.4%
1921	1,891	−5.2%
1931	1,454	−23.1%
1936	1,414	−2.8%
1951	1,465	+3.6%
1961	1,303	−11.1%
1971	1,184	−9.1%
1981	1,163	−1.8%
1991	1,143	−1.7%
2001	1,083	−5.2%
Source: ISTAT
