= Sant'Agapito =

- Comune
- Comune di Sant'Agapito
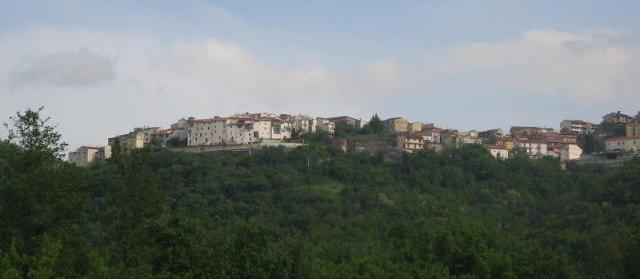
- View of Sant'Agapito

- Location within Italy Location within Molise
- Coordinates: 41°33′N 14°13′E
- Country: Italy
- Region: Molise
- Province: Isernia (IS)
- Frazioni: Colannoni, Coriemano, Pietradonata, Scalo Ferroviario, Temennotte

Government
  - Mayor: Liberato Matticoli

Area
  - Total: 15.93 km^{2} (6.15 sq mi)
- Elevation: 565 m (1,854 ft)

Population (30 September 2016)
  - Total: 1,509
  - Density: 94.73/km^{2} (245.3/sq mi)
- Demonym: Santagapitesi
- Time zone: UTC+1 (CET)
  - Summer (DST): UTC+2 (CEST)
- Postal code: 86070
- Dialing code: 0865
- Website: Official website

Sant'Agapito is a comune (municipality) in the Province of Isernia in the Italian region Molise, located about 40 kilometres (25 mi) west of Campobasso and about 6 kilometres (4 mi) south of Isernia.

Sant'Agapito borders the following municipalities: Isernia, Longano, Macchia d'Isernia and Monteroduni.
