= Carovilli =

- Comune
- Comune di Carovilli
- Location within Italy Location within Molise
- Coordinates: 41°43′N 14°18′E
- Country: Italy
- Region: Molise
- Province: Province of Isernia (IS)
- Frazioni: Briccioso, Castiglione, Cerrosavino, Fontecurelli, Pescorvaro

Area
  - Total: 41.6 km^{2} (16.1 sq mi)
- Elevation: 865 m (2,838 ft)

Population (Dec. 2004)
  - Total: 1,508
  - Density: 36.3/km^{2} (93.9/sq mi)
- Demonym: Carovillesi
- Time zone: UTC+1 (CET)
  - Summer (DST): UTC+2 (CEST)
- Postal code: 86083
- Dialing code: 0865

Carovilli is a comune (municipality) in the Province of Isernia in the Italian region Molise, located about 35 kilometres (22 mi) northwest of Campobasso and about 14 kilometres (8.7 mi) northeast of Isernia. As of 31 December 2004, it had a population of 1,508 and an area of 41.6 square kilometres (16.1 mi^{2}).

The municipality of Carovilli contains the frazioni (subdivisions, mainly villages and hamlets) Briccioso, Castiglione, Cerrosavino, Fontecurelli, and Pescorvaro.

Carovilli borders the following municipalities: Agnone, Miranda, Pescolanciano, Roccasicura, Vastogirardi.

== Demographic evolution ==
Historical population

Year	Pop.	±%
1861	2,908	—
1871	3,093	+6.4%
1881	3,185	+3.0%
1901	3,468	+8.9%
1911	3,284	−5.3%

Year	Pop.	±%
1921	3,280	−0.1%
1931	2,429	−25.9%
1936	2,404	−1.0%
1951	2,427	+1.0%
1961	2,172	−10.5%

Year	Pop.	±%
1971	2,113	−2.7%
1981	1,609	−23.9%
1991	1,618	+0.6%
2001	1,528	−5.6%

Source: Data from ISTAT
