= Montenero Val Cocchiara =

Montenero Val Cocchiara Mundunurë
- Comune
- Comune di Montenero Val Cocchiara
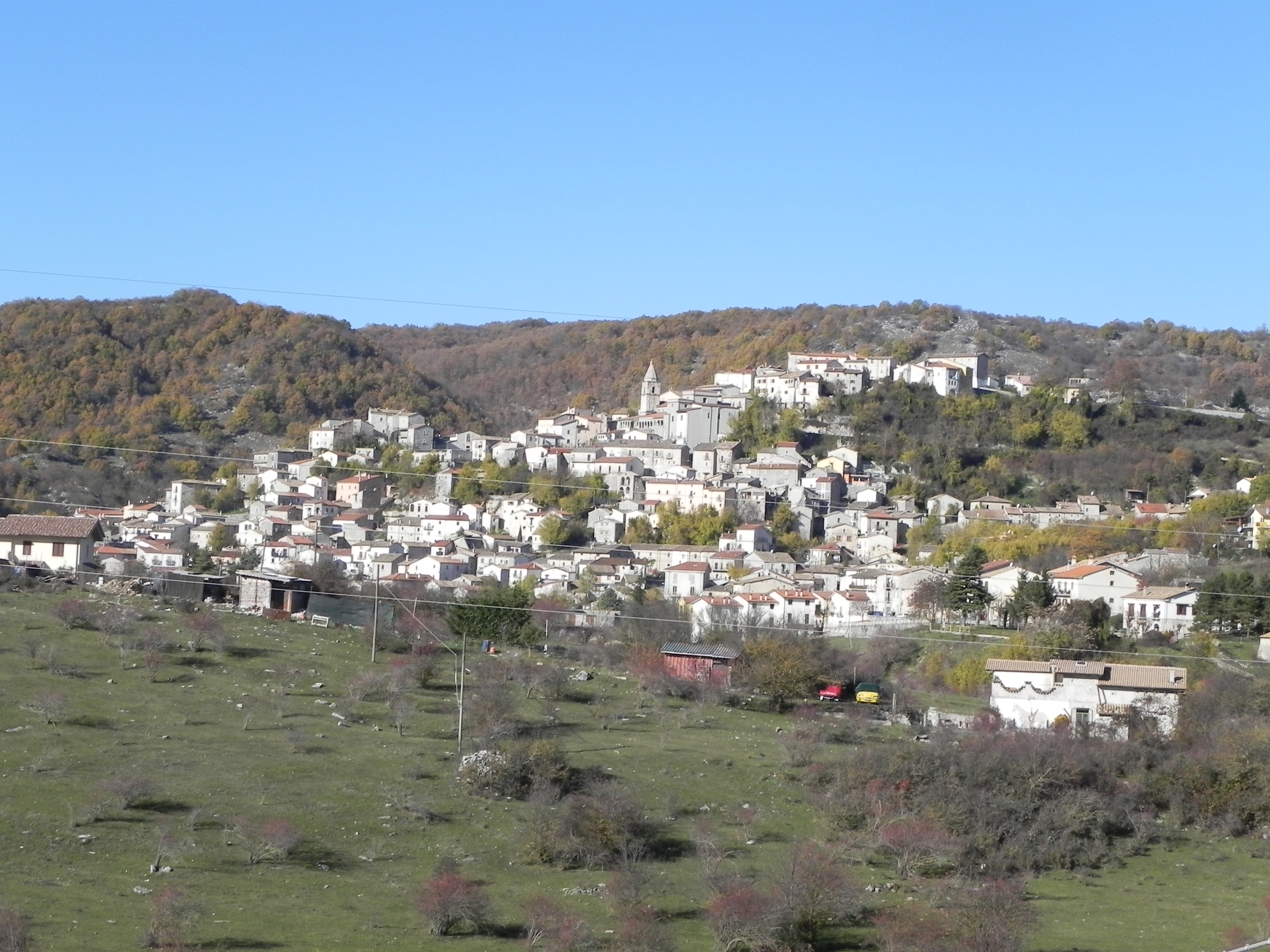

- Coat of arms

- Location within Italy Location within Molise
- Coordinates: 41°43′N 14°04′E
- Country: Italy
- Region: Molise
- Province: Isernia (IS)

Government
  - Mayor: Filippo Zuchegna

Area
  - Total: 23.43 km^{2} (9.05 sq mi)
- Elevation: 893 m (2,930 ft)

Population (30 November 2017)
  - Total: 516
  - Density: 22.0/km^{2} (57.0/sq mi)
- Time zone: UTC+1 (CET)
  - Summer (DST): UTC+2 (CEST)
- Postal code: 86080
- Dialing code: 0865
- Website: Official website

Montenero Val Cocchiara (Molisan: Mundunurë) is a town and comune in the Province of Isernia, in the Molise region of southern Italy.
