= Castelverrino =

- Comune
- Comune di Castelverrino
- Coat of arms

- Location within Italy Location within Molise
- Coordinates: 41°46′N 14°24′E
- Country: Italy
- Region: Molise
- Province: Isernia (IS)

Government
  - Mayor: Antonio Pannunzio

Area
  - Total: 6.2 km^{2} (2.4 sq mi)
- Elevation: 600 m (2,000 ft)

Population (30 June 2017)
  - Total: 106
  - Density: 17/km^{2} (44/sq mi)
- Demonym: Castelverrinesi
- Time zone: UTC+1 (CET)
  - Summer (DST): UTC+2 (CEST)
- Postal code: 86080
- Dialing code: 0865
- Website: Official website

Castelverrino is a comune (municipality) in the Province of Isernia in the Italian region Molise, located about 30 kilometres (19 mi) northwest of Campobasso and about 25 kilometres (16 mi) northeast of Isernia.
