= Macchiagodena =

- Comune
- Comune di Macchiagodena
- Coat of arms

- Location within Italy Location within Molise
- Coordinates: 41°34′N 14°24′E
- Country: Italy
- Region: Molise
- Province: Isernia (IS)

Government
  - Mayor: Felice Ciccone

Area
  - Total: 34 km^{2} (13 sq mi)
- Elevation: 864 m (2,835 ft)

Population (30 September 2017)
  - Total: 1,811
  - Density: 53/km^{2} (140/sq mi)
- Demonym: Macchiagodenesi
- Time zone: UTC+1 (CET)
  - Summer (DST): UTC+2 (CEST)
- Postal code: 86096
- Dialing code: 0865
- Patron saint: Saint Nicholas
- Saint day: Third Sunday in May
- Website: Official website

Macchiagodena (Italian pronunciation: [makkjaˈɡɔːdena]) is a town and comune in the province of Isernia, located high in the Apennine mountains in the region of Molise, southern Italy.

== History ==
The present name of the city appeared for the first time in a document of the year 964 CE as Maccia de Godena. It was a garrison post between the Lombard countdoms of Isernia and Boiano, and later a sighting post along the Pescasseroli-Candela tratturo (shepherds' track). A great number of feudal lords came one after the other to take control of the castle (due to the high vantage point overlooking the valley), including the Pandoni and the Mormile.

Many of the early to mid 20th Century inhabitants emigrated to numerous countries, including Australia, Argentina, Brazil, Canada and USA.

== Main sights ==
The Castle of Macchiagodena, with a polygonal plant, was constructed on one limestone cliff spur. Of the castle today, only the basements of the old wall and two towers remain. The Castello (Castle) was put up for sale and was purchased in November 2009 by the Regione of Molise. The Regione decided to purchase the castle for its preservation for public use and part of it may be used as a regional historical museum. Also noteworthy is the Church of Santa Maria Assunta, with a statue made by Francesco Saverio Citarelli from Naples, and a precious processional cross.

== Culture ==
Every year during the 3rd Sunday in May a fine large fair is held to celebrate the feast day of San Nicola, the patron saint of the town.

A peculiar tradition is still maintained by some of the population: known as rapimento ("kidnapping"), it consists in the kidnapping of the future bride some time before the wedding is celebrated. Another tradition is a local dance called "tuzacula".
