= Rionero Sannitico =

- Comune
- Comune di Rionero Sannitico
- Coat of arms

- Location within Italy Location within Molise
- Coordinates: 41°43′N 14°8′E
- Country: Italy
- Region: Molise
- Province: Isernia (IS)
- Frazioni: Casabona, Castiglione, Collefava, Le Canala, Le Martine, Le Vigne, Montalto, Predalve, San Mariano, Vernali

Government
  - Mayor: Palmerino D'Amico

Area
  - Total: 29.0 km^{2} (11.2 sq mi)

Population (Dec. 2004)
  - Total: 1,179
  - Density: 40.7/km^{2} (105/sq mi)
- Time zone: UTC+1 (CET)
  - Summer (DST): UTC+2 (CEST)
- Postal code: 86087
- Dialing code: 0865

Rionero Sannitico is a comune (municipality) in the Province of Isernia in the Italian region Molise, located about 45 kilometres (28 mi) northwest of Campobasso and about 15 kilometres (9 mi) northwest of Isernia.
