= Sant'Angelo del Pesco =

- Comune
- Comune di Sant'Angelo del Pesco
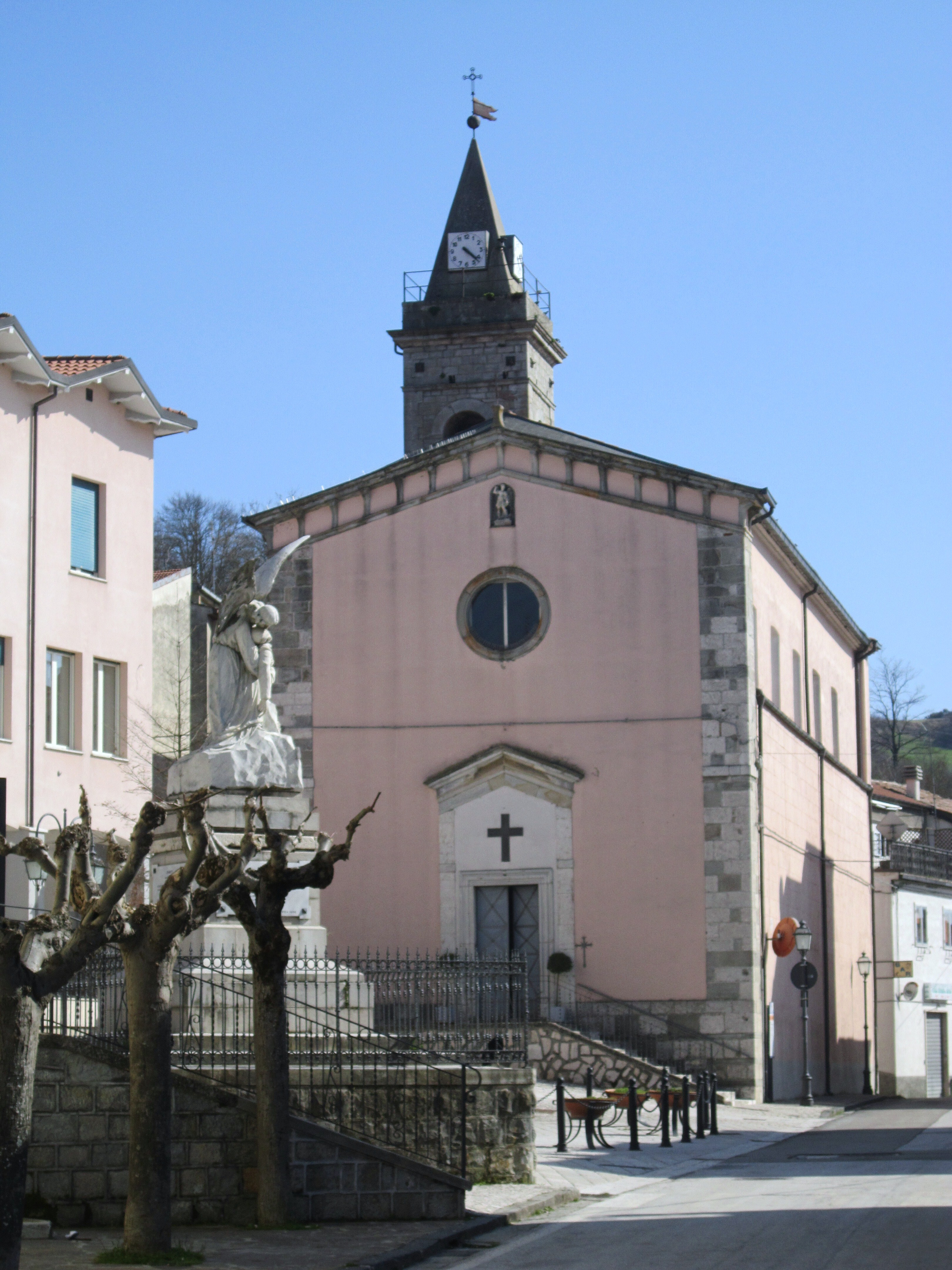
- Church in Sant'Angelo del Pesco

- Coat of arms

- Location within Italy Location within Molise
- Coordinates: 41°53′N 14°15′E
- Country: Italy
- Region: Molise
- Province: Isernia (IS)
- Frazioni: Canala

Government
  - Mayor: Nunziatina Nucci

Area
  - Total: 15.5 km^{2} (6.0 sq mi)
- Elevation: 650 m (2,130 ft)

Population (31 December 2013)
  - Total: 369
  - Density: 23.8/km^{2} (61.7/sq mi)
- Demonym: Santangiolesi
- Time zone: UTC+1 (CET)
  - Summer (DST): UTC+2 (CEST)
- Postal code: 86080
- Dialing code: 0865
- Website: Official website

Sant'Angelo del Pesco is a comune (municipality) in the Province of Isernia in the Italian region Molise, located about 50 kilometres (31 mi) northwest of Campobasso and about 30 kilometres (19 mi) north of Isernia.
