= Forlì del Sannio =

- Comune
- Comune di Forlì del Sannio
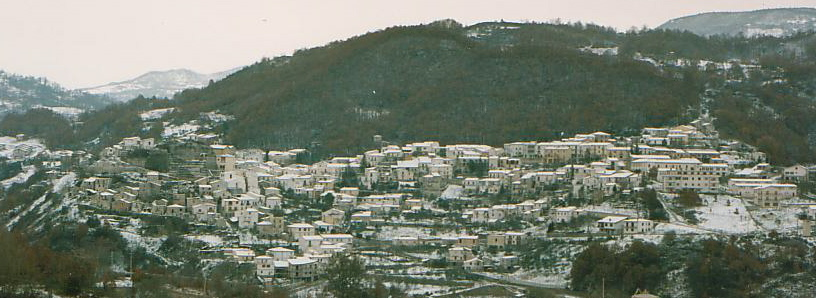
- Panorama of Forlì del Sannio

- Coat of arms

- Location within Italy Location within Molise
- Coordinates: 41°42′N 14°11′E
- Country: Italy
- Region: Molise
- Province: Isernia (IS)
- Frazioni: Vandra, Macchia, Convento Vecchio, Acqua dei Ranci, Lotto, Ricinuso

Government
  - Mayor: Roberto Calabrese

Area
  - Total: 32.56 km^{2} (12.57 sq mi)
- Elevation: 610 m (2,000 ft)

Population (31 August 2017)
  - Total: 685
  - Density: 21.0/km^{2} (54.5/sq mi)
- Demonym: Forlivesi
- Time zone: UTC+1 (CET)
  - Summer (DST): UTC+2 (CEST)
- Postal code: 86084
- Dialing code: 0865
- Website: Official website

Forlì del Sannio is a comune (municipality) in the Province of Isernia in the Italian region Molise, located about 45 kilometres (28 mi) northwest of Campobasso and about 12 kilometres (7 mi) northwest of Isernia.

== Twin towns ==
- Rives, France
