= Fornelli =

- Comune
- Comune di Fornelli
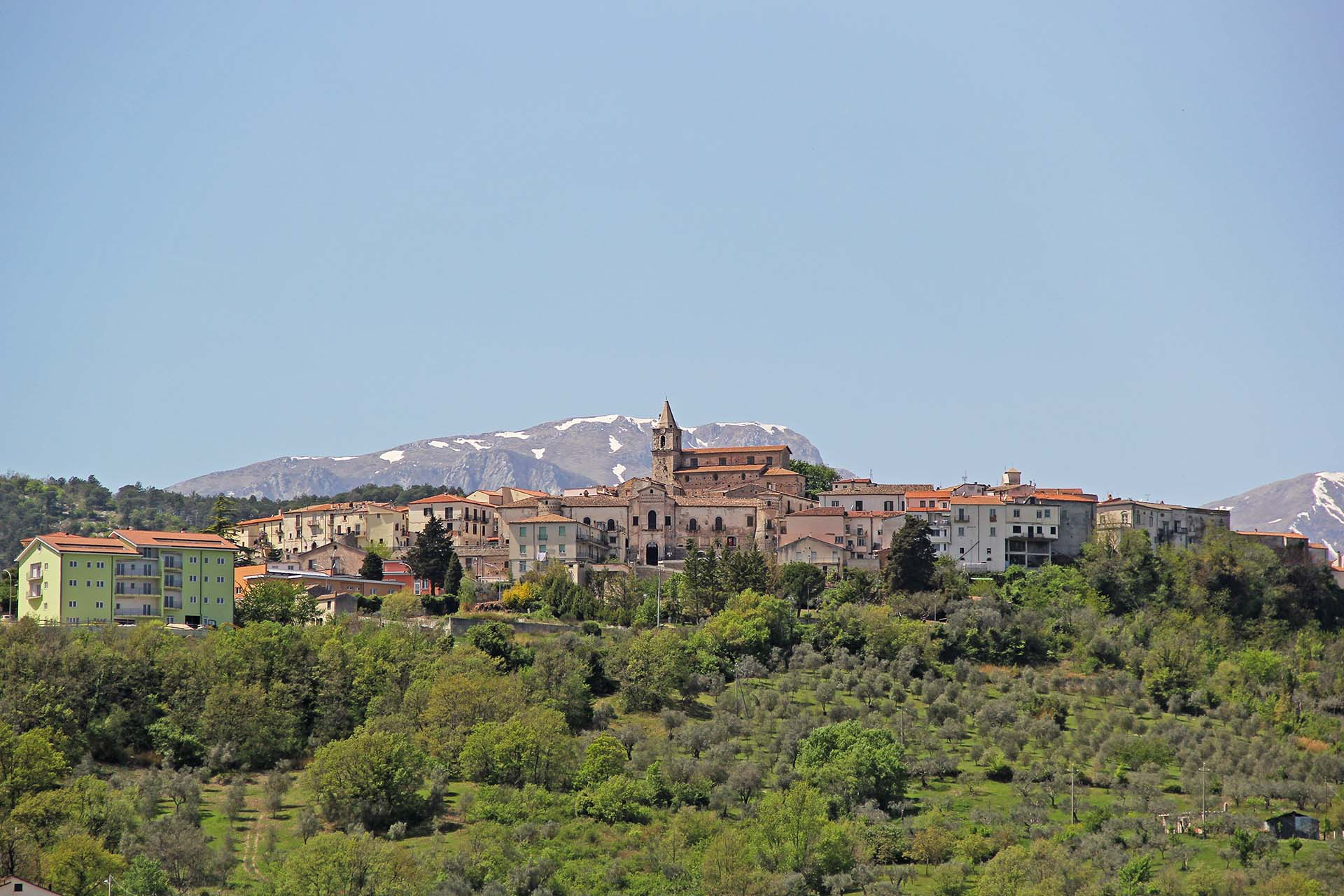

- Coat of arms

- Location within Italy Location within Molise
- Coordinates: 41°36′N 14°8′E
- Country: Italy
- Region: Molise
- Province: Isernia (IS)
- Frazioni: Bivio, Canala, Castello, Cervaro, Chiuselle, Fontanelle, Fornelli, Guardiello, Pincere, Santa Maria Casali

Government
  - Mayor: Giovanni Tedeschi

Area
  - Total: 23.1 km^{2} (8.9 sq mi)
- Elevation: 530 m (1,740 ft)

Population (31 December 2007)
  - Total: 2,014
  - Density: 87.2/km^{2} (226/sq mi)
- Demonym: Fornellesi
- Time zone: UTC+1 (CET)
  - Summer (DST): UTC+2 (CEST)
- Postal code: 86070
- Dialing code: 0865

Fornelli is a comune (municipality) in the Province of Isernia in the Italian region Molise, located about 45 kilometres (28 mi) west of Campobasso and about 8 kilometres (5 mi) west of Isernia. It is one of I Borghi più belli d'Italia ("The most beautiful villages of Italy").

Annunziata D’Alesandro (née Lombardi), the mother of Nancy Pelosi, was born in Fornelli in 1909.

== Sister cities ==
- West Warwick, Rhode Island, United States
