= Cerro al Volturno =

- Comune
- Comune di Cerro al Volturno
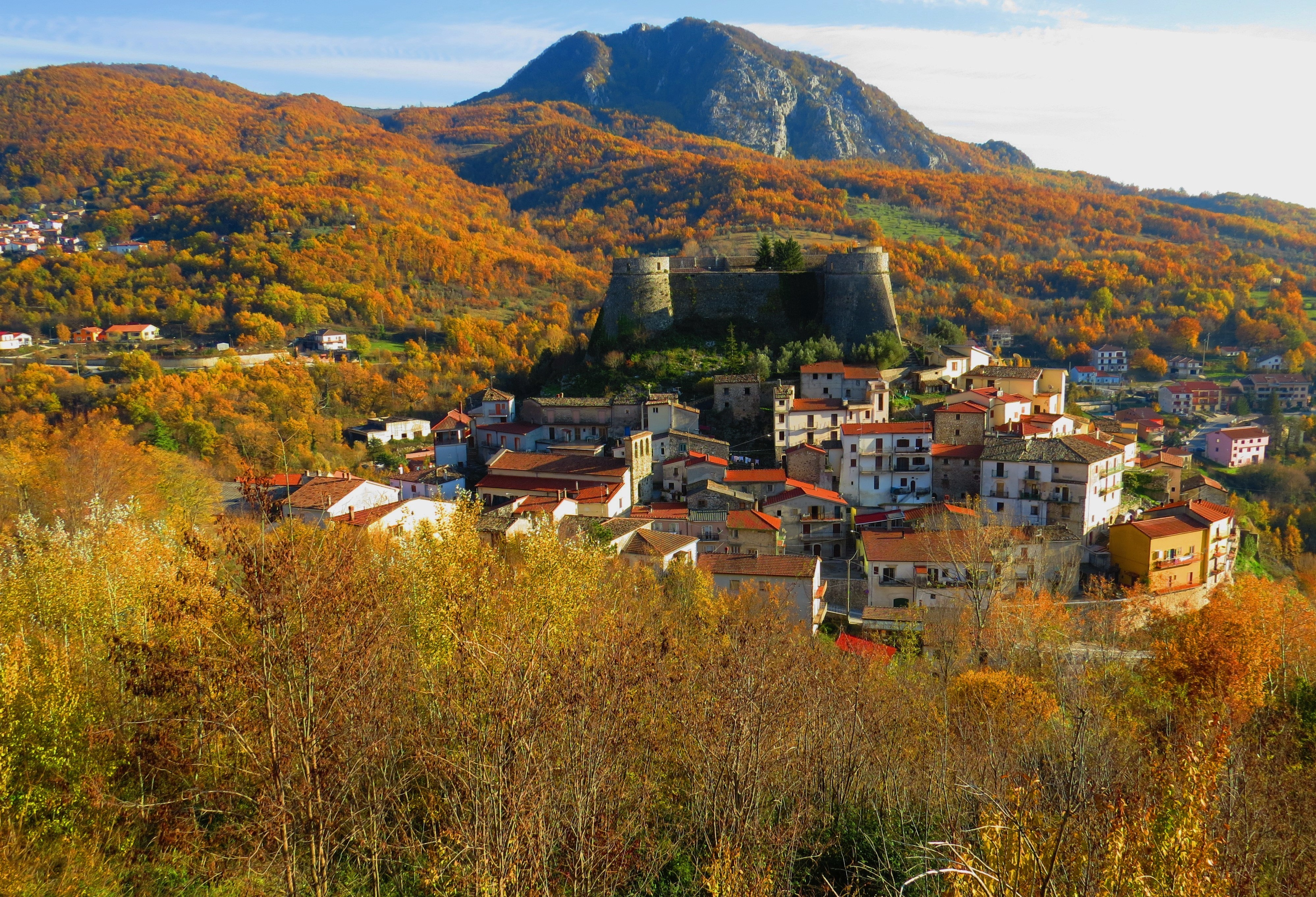
- View of Cerro al Volturno

- Coat of arms

- Location within Italy Location within Molise
- Coordinates: 41°39′N 14°8′E
- Country: Italy
- Region: Molise
- Province: Isernia (IS)

Government
  - Mayor: Remo Di Ianni

Area
  - Total: 23.79 km^{2} (9.19 sq mi)
- Elevation: 572 m (1,877 ft)

Population (31 August 2022)
  - Total: 1,144
  - Density: 48.09/km^{2} (124.5/sq mi)
- Demonym: Cerresi
- Time zone: UTC+1 (CET)
  - Summer (DST): UTC+2 (CEST)
- Postal code: 86072
- Dialing code: 0865
- Website: Official website

Cerro al Volturno is a comune (municipality) in the Province of Isernia, in the Italian region of Molise. It is located about 45 kilometres (28 mi) west of Campobasso, and about 10 kilometres (6 mi) northwest of Isernia.

The town was founded in the 3rd century BC by the Samnites. It houses a castle called Pandone, built around 1000 on a spur commanding the nearby valley.
