= Montaquila =

- Comune
- Comune di Montaquila
- Coat of arms

- Location within Italy Location within Molise
- Coordinates: 41°34′N 14°07′E
- Country: Italy
- Region: Molise
- Province: Isernia (IS)
- Frazioni: Roccaravindola, Masserie la Corte, Carpinete, Petrara, Colle Pepe

Government
  - Mayor: Marciano Ricci

Area
  - Total: 25 km^{2} (9.7 sq mi)

Population (2001)
  - Total: 2,471
  - Density: 99/km^{2} (260/sq mi)
- Time zone: UTC+1 (CET)
  - Summer (DST): UTC+2 (CEST)
- Postal code: 86070
- Dialing code: 0865

Montaquila is a town and comune in the province of Isernia, in the Molise region of southern Italy.
