= Pettorano massacre =

1860 battle during the unification of Italy

Battle of Pettorano
- Part of the Risorgimento
Date	17 October 1860
Location	Pettoranello del Molise, Italy
Result	Bourbon victory

Belligerents
Southern Army	The Two Sicilies

Commanders and leaders
Francesco Nullo	Unknown

Strength
1,000–2,000	2,000

Casualties and losses
Only 372 survived (during massacre)	Unknown (during massacre)
- ~300 killed on both sides (first battle)

The Pettorano massacre (Italian: Strage di Pettorano, Italian pronunciation: [ˈstraːdʒe di pettoˈraːno]) unfolded on 17 October 1860, during the period of the Italian Risorgimento. This event constituted an armed clash between the forces of Giuseppe Garibaldi and those loyal to the Bourbon dynasty, occurring within the broader context of the campaign against the Kingdom of the Two Sicilies. While the engagement did not possess substantial military or political importance in the context of the Risorgimento, it temporarily allowed the supporters of Francis II to reassert control over the province of Isernia. The battle is noteworthy in representing a rare victory for the pro-Bourbon army, which had been achieved principally through activity on the part of irregular guerrilla bands. There is also evidence to the effect that there was a massacre of the defeated during and in the aftermath of the battle. Although not better known to popular imagination as might otherwise have been the case, the action has occasionally been foregrounded by Marxist historiography and more recently has come in for renewed attention from traditionalist historians.

== Isernia uprising ==
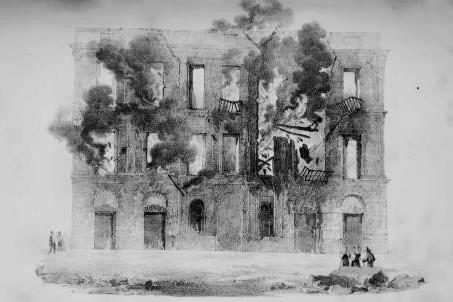
Isernia after the outbreak of the revolt.

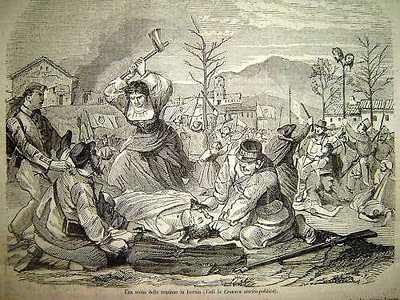
An illustration from "Il Mondo Illustrato, Giornale universale" (Turin, Italy, 1861), titled "Una scena della reazione di Isernia" and depicting the lynching of individuals with liberal pro-unification sympathies during the legitimist revolt that erupted in Isernia in October 1860.

During the summer of 1860, localized instances of peasant resistance to the newly established government began to manifest in the mountainous regions of Abruzzo and Molise. Concurrently, isolated units of the former Bourbon army remained active within this territory. On September 30, Legitimist guerrilla forces seized control of the town of Isernia (approximately 8,000 inhabitants), which was defended by a small contingent of around 20 Garibaldian soldiers and local recruits of the anti-Bourbon National Guard. The capture of the town was marked by scenes of intense violence. Peasants executed prisoners and individuals suspected of harboring liberal sympathies, and this surge of spontaneous violence was accompanied by acts of extreme brutality. Accounts detail the gruesome murder of the mayor's son, who was reportedly subjected to the mutilation of his eyes prior to his death. Another prominent citizen, previously known for anti-Bourbon sentiments, suffered the horrific act of having his genitals removed and placed in his mouth. The aggression of the insurgents appeared to be particularly directed not towards the captured Garibaldian soldiers, but rather towards the representatives of the local bourgeoisie, the galantuomini, who were perceived as collaborators and traitors. The Bishop of Isernia, appealed to by liberals for intervention based on Christian principles of mercy, reportedly declined to offer assistance.

On 4 October 1860, approximately 800 members of the National Guard launched an assault on Isernia. After a three-hour engagement, pro-Bourbon forces withdrew from the city. In the aftermath, a wave of reprisals was carried out by liberal elements, although reportedly on a smaller scale than earlier episodes of violence. Dozens of individuals were arrested, and incidents of murder and looting were recorded. Among the most prominent acts was the public arrest of Bishop Saladino, whose personal secretary was killed.

The following day, on 5 October, remnants of the Bourbon army and partisan units that had previously retreated from Isernia regrouped and launched a counteroffensive. The National Guard offered limited resistance and eventually withdrew toward Castel di Sangro in Abruzzo, anticipating the imminent arrival of regular forces from the Kingdom of Sardinia.

== Opposing forces ==
=== Garibaldine Army ===
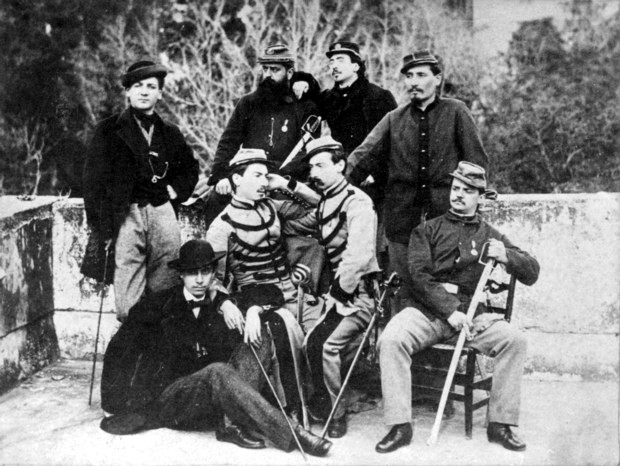
A Garibaldine Army, 1860.

Giuseppe Garibaldi assigned the operation primarily to the so-called Corpo del Matese, a mixed formation of approximately one thousand Sicilian volunteers stationed in Maddaloni, which was part at the time of the Southern Army. This force was accompanied by reconnaissance units and a group of staff officers. Command was entrusted to Lieutenant Colonel Francesco Nullo, a close associate of Garibaldi who had been active in various military campaigns since 1848. However, Nullo lacked independent experience in commanding large formations. Nullo requested that two battalions of Lombard riflemen be assigned to the operation, but Garibaldi declined the request. A battery of artillery was expected to arrive from Caserta, yet it failed to reach the column before its departure from Maddaloni.

The force set out on 12 October and arrived in Boiano, approximately 20 kilometres (12 mi) from Isernia, on 15 October. Nullo had anticipated joining up with 3,000 National Guardsmen there, but the actual number present was significantly lower. In total, the force numbered from 1,000 to 2,000 men just before the battle.

=== Bourbon Army ===
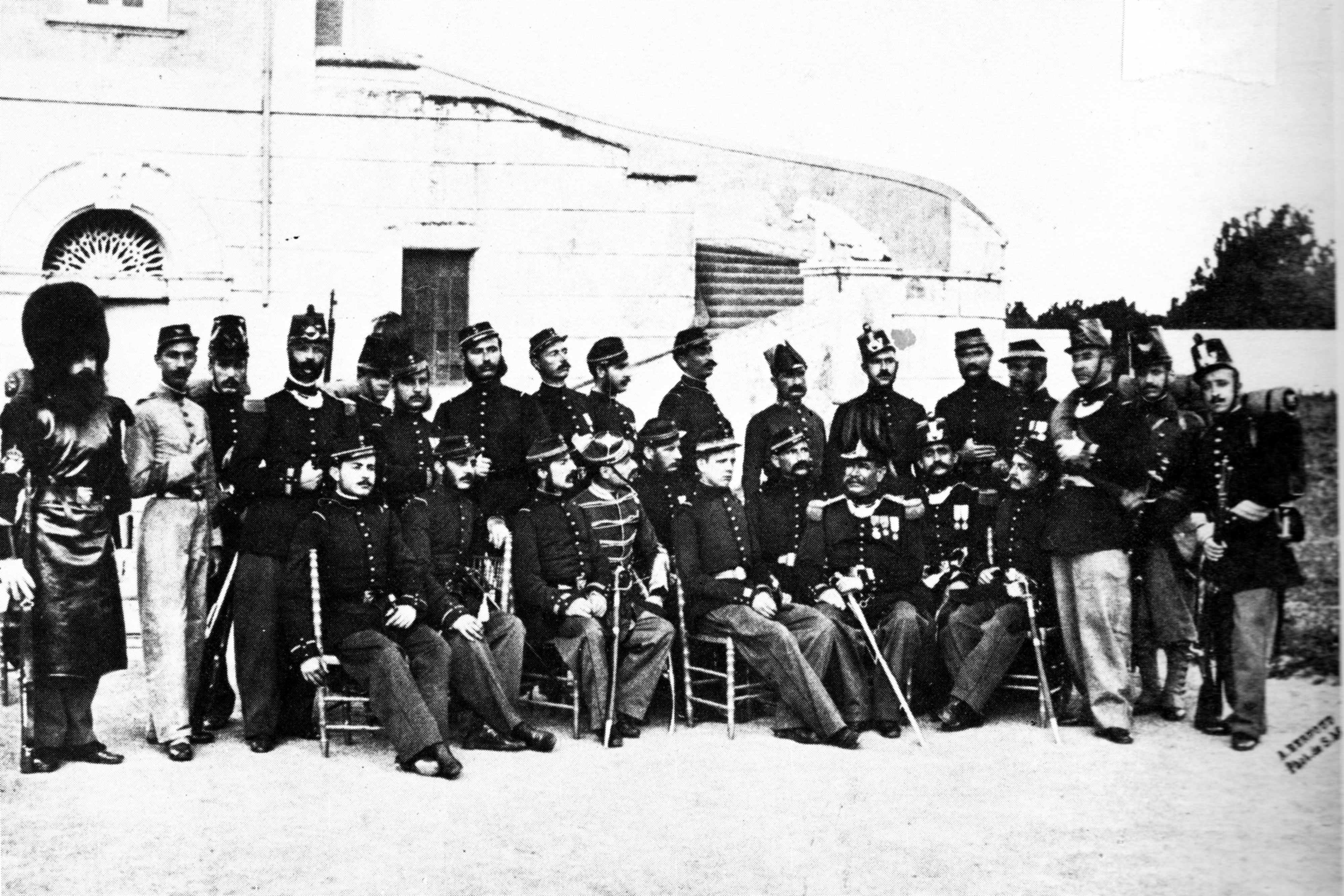
Officers of the Army of the Two Sicilies from Capua.

The pro-Bourbon forces comprised both regular troops and irregular militias. The regular contingent included approximately 500 grenadiers and around 350 gendarmes, although some sources estimate the total number of uniformed personnel at up to 2,000. In addition, at least an equal number of irregulars (primarily local peasant militias) participated in the engagement. These irregulars, often labeled briganti (bandits) or referred to pejoratively as cafoni (a term denoting rural backwardness), were residents of nearby mountain villages.

The motivations of these irregular fighters are seldom explored in historiography. However, some scholars suggest contributing factors such as resentment over requisitions, influence from the clergy, opposition to the emerging capitalist order, and traditional loyalty to the monarchy. Their allegiance was symbolized in the battle cry "Viva Francesco e viva Maria."

Command of the regular units is attributed to Colonel Achille de Liguori of the gendarmerie and Michele Sardi of the grenadiers. The peasant formations, by contrast, appear to have been led by unnamed local figures. While the regular troops were armed with standard-issue weapons, the irregulars were equipped with rudimentary arms, including hunting rifles, pitchforks, flails, axes, and sickles.

== Battle ==
=== Beginning ===
At Boiano, Francesco Nullo reorganized his column, incorporating local units of the National Guard, and commenced the march towards Isernia. On 16 October, the main contingent reached the town of Cantalupo, where they were quartered overnight. The following day, 17 October, the force resumed its advance toward Isernia, located roughly 15 kilometres (9.3 mi) away. The route lay across a subsidiary ridge of the Monti di Matese, whose moderate peaks rose slightly above 1,000 meters above sea level. Around midday, the column entered a narrow valley and proceeded north between the hill towns of Carpinone and Pettorano, descending gradually toward Isernia. Nullo's tactical plan called for a pincer movement: Captain de Marco's detachment was to secure Carpinone and then flank Isernia from the east to launch an assault from the north, while Nullo himself would lead the larger contingent to seize Pettorano and descend from the south.

In the early afternoon, Nullo's column took Pettorano, located approximately 4 kilometres (2.5 mi) from Isernia. The headquarters was established at the residence of the Santoro family, prominent local landowners, where the officers were treated to an abundant meal. During the pause, reconnaissance reported that Bourbon forces had begun deploying from Isernia, forming a semicircle around the hill to isolate the Garibaldian troops from de Marco's detachment at Carpinone. In response, Nullo dispatched a cavalry squadron northeast to disrupt the Bourbon irregulars and reestablish contact with de Marco. The squadron swiftly dispersed the loosely organized partisan groups, boosting morale among the Garibaldian ranks stationed in Pettorano. Meanwhile, the staff officers remained engaged in the meal at Santoro's, and Nullo, in a moment of leisure, began playing the piano. At approximately 5 p.m., the calm was shattered by cannon fire near the village perimeter, accompanied by cries among the Garibaldian soldiers: "I cafoni al monte!" ("The peasants on the hill!")

=== Confrontation ===
The Bourbon forces that had departed from Isernia advanced stealthily through wooded terrain and began their assault on the hilltop village of Pettorano with gunfire. What followed remains a matter of debate, with historical accounts providing conflicting narratives. Some sources suggest that an initial push by regular Bourbon troops was successfully repelled by Garibaldian defenders. In one account, a detachment of approximately 150 Garibaldian volunteers not only beat back the attackers but pursued them downhill, reportedly reaching the outskirts of Isernia. Realizing, however, that they were isolated and at risk of encirclement, the group attempted to retreat back to Pettorano. Most versions of events, however, converge on the point that the Garibaldian defensive line eventually began to crumble. Irregular Bourbon partisan forces, many armed with rudimentary peasant tools, managed to infiltrate the village. The firefight dragged on for at least an hour, and as ammunition ran low on both sides, the conflict descended into brutal close-quarters combat involving bayonets, sabres, rifle butts, and improvised weapons like flails and sickles.

The role of Francesco Nullo and his staff during this phase remains particularly controversial. The Garibaldian headquarters at the Santoro estate, located in the upper portion of Pettorano, was not directly threatened at the outset of the assault. One version holds that, partly cut off from the main force, Nullo and his officers fought their way south through Bourbon units blocking the road, eventually reaching the town of Taverna some 10 kilometres (6.2 mi) away, where they attempted to rally a relief column from stragglers. An alternate version portrays this as a chaotic and uncoordinated flight, with Nullo unable to restore command or effectively mobilize support upon arriving in Taverna.

Meanwhile, Pettorano fell. The Bourbon forces overran the village, seized and plundered the Santoro residence, and set it ablaze. The Garibaldian defenders, in disarray, broke and scattered into the surrounding forested hills, effectively marking the collapse of the expeditionary force.

=== Massacre ===
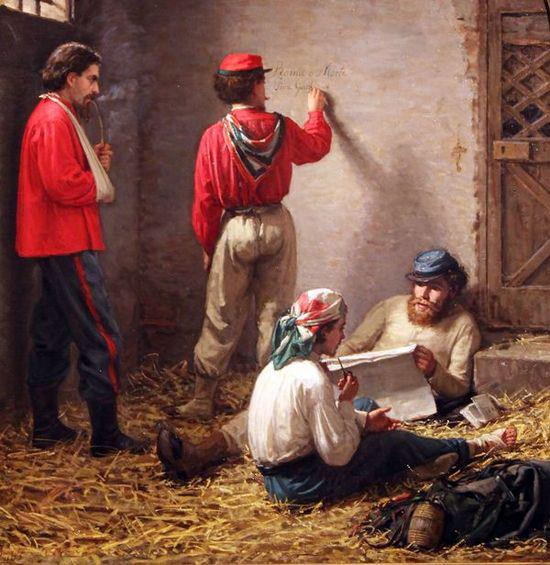
Captured Garibaldini (painting, oil on canvas by Gioacchino Toma.)

Nullo assembled a relief force in Taverna and attempted to return to the area of operations, but his march was obstructed by superior Bourbon forces. In Pettorano, the battle had devolved into a dispersal of Garibaldian troops. The column lost cohesion and broke into disorganized groups attempting to flee. Peasant militias, including women and minors, searched the forests and did not take prisoners. Captured Garibaldian soldiers were executed on the spot, often with rudimentary weapons. Some were killed with stones. A few prisoners who initially escaped were recaptured and executed. Others attempted to reach Bourbon military or gendarmerie units, where they were treated as prisoners of war. In some cases, convoys of prisoners en route to Isernia were attacked by civilians, though guards sometimes intervened to prevent lynchings.

On 18 October, the pursuit of Garibaldian fugitives continued with reduced intensity. Some captured individuals were taken to Carpinone, where they were beaten to death in public. Victims were stripped of clothing and valuables. Some were buried, but human remains were still found in the area in the 1950s. There were also instances of mutilation and public display of remains. The total number of dead is unknown. One source records 372 men remaining in Garibaldian ranks after the battle. Given an estimated strength of slightly over one thousand soldiers, the remainder were either killed, escaped, or taken prisoner. Some were released following the occupation of the area by the Kingdom of Sardinia. A triumphal procession was held in Carpinone, displaying images of King Francis II and Queen Maria Sophie.

== Interpretations ==
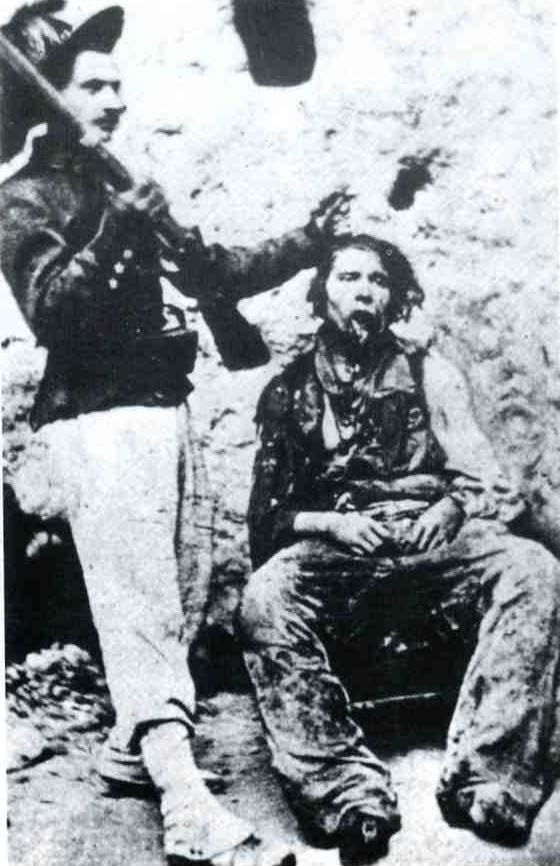
Bersagliere (left) with a captured brigante (right).

Historiographical interpretations of the Battle of Pettorano vary widely, with particular debate surrounding the decision to march on Isernia. One prominent view holds that Nullo had received explicit instructions from Garibaldi to delay any action until Piedmontese forces arrived, so that the city could be taken in coordination. However, some scholars argue that Nullo deliberately ignored this directive, aware that a Bourbon column under General Luigi Scotti was approaching from Campania. Determined to capture Isernia before enemy reinforcements could intervene, Nullo may have chosen to act independently. Others contend that his motivations were ideological: as a staunch republican, Nullo harbored little allegiance to King Victor Emmanuel II and his army, and instead sought to secure the city on his own terms, presenting it as a gesture of goodwill rather than submitting to royal command. Yet another interpretation suggests that Nullo had placed misguided faith in the idea of a southern population yearning for liberation and ready to rally behind Garibaldi's cause. In contrast, opposing scholars argue that Nullo grossly underestimated the peasant resistance, viewing them as a disorganized, primitive force likely to collapse at first contact.

Debate also extends to the conduct of the pro-Bourbon units. Some historians detect a clear tactical design in their maneuvers, positing that the Garibaldian force was deliberately lured into a trap. According to this view, Nullo's column was encouraged to fragment and settle on the easily isolated heights of Pettorano. The calculated departure of Bourbon troops from Isernia and the strategic deployment of brigand units—well-acquainted with the rugged terrain and tasked with flanking operations are seen as indicators of premeditated planning. Conversely, an alternative school of thought portrays the royalist victory not as the outcome of a cohesive strategy, but rather the product of local advantages: an informal network of observers, intimate knowledge of the countryside, and the agility of the brigantes. Within this framework, the defeat of Nullo's forces is attributed more to his command's tactical missteps than to any masterful orchestration by the enemy.

== Sources ==
Bibliography

- Caprarica, Antonio (2010). C'era una volta in Italia (in Italian). Rome, Italy: Sperling & Kupfer. ISBN 978-88-7339-288-0.
- Petteni, Giuliana Donato (1960). "Francesco Nullo, cavaliere della libertà". In Agazzi, Alberto (ed.). Le 180 biografie dei bergamaschi dei Mille (PDF) (in Italian). Bergamo, Italy: Bolis. [ISBN unspecified]
- Venditti, Gabriele (2011). Isernia al cadere de' Borboni (PDF) (in Italian). s.l. [ISBN unspecified]
- Caroti, Marcelo (2015). Garibaldi il primo fascista (in Italian). Milan, Italy: Youcanprint. ISBN 978-88-911-7795-7.

Web links

- De Sio Cesari, Giovanni (2 June 2021). "La strage di Pettorano e la battaglia del Macerone". together381.wordpress.com (in Italian).
- Spallone, Sandro (28 February 2012). "Una brutta pagina de storia". carpione.blogspot.com (in Italian).
