= Bovianum =

Two cities of ancient Italy were named Bovianum, both in Samnium:

- Bojano (Bovianum Undecumanorum)
- Bovianum Vetus, a colonia of uncertain location, sometimes (erroneously, according to the Oxford Classical Dictionary), identified with Pietrabbondante

Bovianum served as the capital of Samnium, it held the Samnium government building; and the city fell to the Roman republic in 306 BC during the 2nd Samnite war, which led to the fall of Samnium.
