= Pesco (disambiguation) =

PESCO may refer to:

- Permanent Structured Cooperation, a European Union defence pact
- Peshawar Electric Supply Company, a Pakistan energy company situated in Peshawar

Pesco may also refer to:

- Pesco (Fuscaldo), Fuscaldo, a civil parish in Calabria, Italy
- Joseph del Pesco (born 1975), American contemporary art curator
- Paul Pesco (born 1959), American guitarist

== See also ==
- Pesca (disambiguation)
- Pesche, a municipality of the Province of Isernia, Molise, Italy
