= Raffaele Gioia =

Italian painter

Raffaele Gioia (1757 in San Massimo, Province of Campobasso in the Molise – July 26, 1805) was an Italian painter.

== Biography ==
He initially trained with his father, Alessandro. But was also influenced by Paolo Gamba. Raffaele and two of his sons died during an earthquake.

He painted a Christ handing keys to St Peter for the main altar of the Cathedral of Isernia. In the same church, he painted Christ and the Adulterous Woman and Christ at the Temple with the Doctors (choir); The Virgin Mary Addolorata and Saints Michael, Nicandro, Marciano and Vito (lateral altars). For the Cathedral of Boiano, he painted Baptism of a King and Sermon of St Bartholomew (1793). In a church of Venafro, he painted a canvas. His frescoes (1804) depicting Life of the Virgin are found in the parish church of Pettoranello del Molise. For this church, he also painted an Assumption of the Virgin for the altar, work restored in 1872 by Jannes Vernier.
