= Basilica of Our Lady of Sorrows, Castelpetroso =

Basilica of Our Lady of Sorrows
- Basilica santuario di Maria Santissima Addolorata
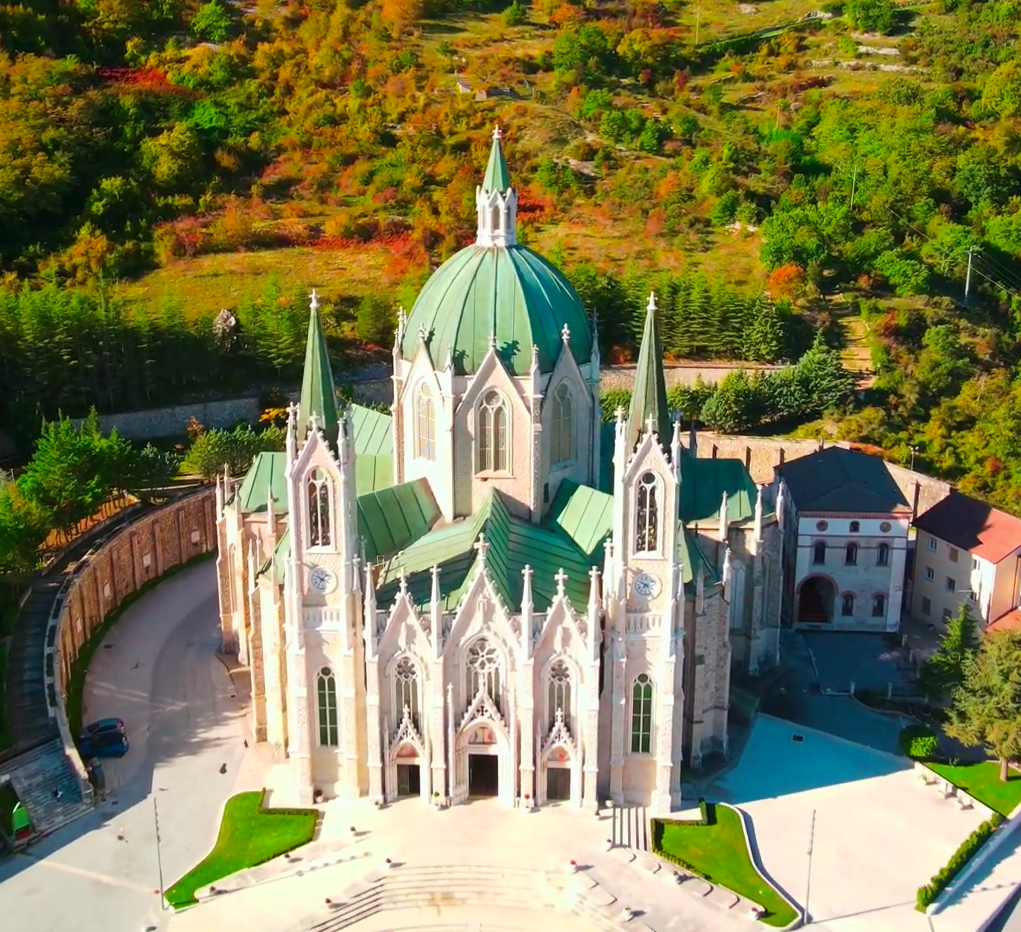
- Aerial view of the Basilica
- Basilica of Our Lady of Sorrows
- 41.6075°N 14.3489°E
- Location: Castelpetroso, Province of Isernia
- Country: Italy
- Denomination: Roman Catholic
- Tradition: Roman Rite
- Website: www.santuarioaddolorata.it/en

History
- Status: Minor basilica
- Consecrated: 21 September 1975

Architecture
- Functional status: Active
- Architect: Gualandi (three generations)
- Architectural type: Marian shrine
- Style: Gothic Revival
- Groundbreaking: 28 September 1890
- Completed: 1975

Specifications
- Materials: Local stone

Administration
- Archdiocese: Campobasso–Boiano

The Basilica of Our Lady of Sorrows (Italian: Basilica santuario di Maria Santissima Addolorata), also known as the Castelpetroso Sanctuary or, popularly, as the Little Lourdes of Italy, is a Catholic minor basilica and Marian shrine located in the commune of Castelpetroso, in the Province of Isernia, Molise, Italy. It is one of the principal Marian sanctuaries of Southern Italy and the patronal shrine of the region of Molise.

The sanctuary originated in connection with a series of Marian apparitions beginning on 22 March 1888, reportedly experienced by two local peasant women (Fabiana Cicchino and Serafina Valentino) at a place called Cesa tra Santi on the slopes of Monte Patalecchia. Construction of the Gothic Revival basilica began with the laying of the foundation stone on 28 September 1890 and was carried out across three generations of the Gualandi family of Bologna, with consecration finally taking place on 21 September 1975.

Pope Paul VI declared Our Lady of Sorrows of Castelpetroso the heavenly patron of the Molise region on 6 December 1973. Pope John Paul II visited the shrine on 19 March 1995, and Pope Francis on 5 July 2014. During the pontificate of Pope Francis, on 24 June 2013 the church was elevated to the rank of minor basilica by decree signed by Cardinal Antonio Cañizares Llovera, Prefect of the Congregation for Divine Worship and the Discipline of the Sacraments.

== History ==
=== The 1888 apparitions ===
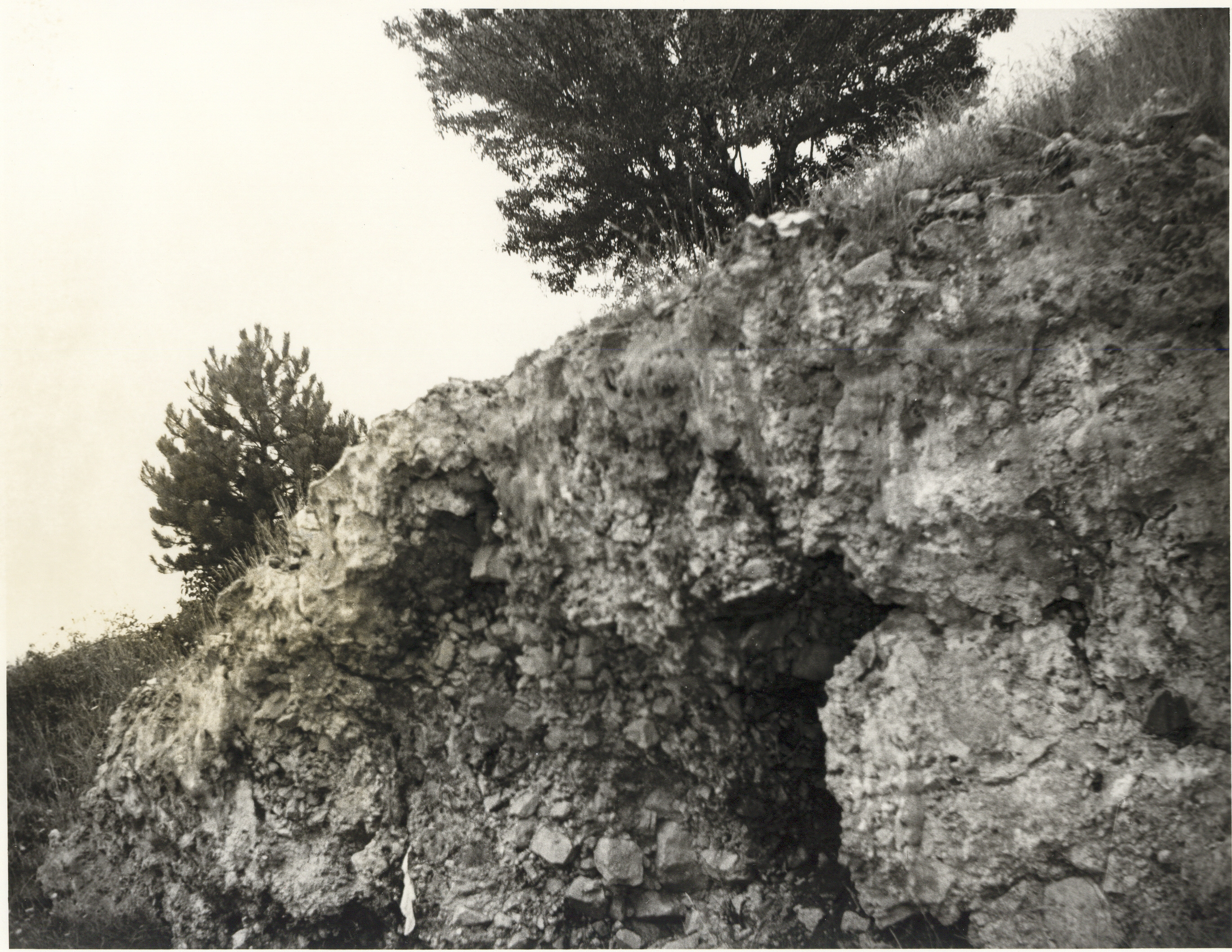
Historical photograph of the apparition rock at Cesa tra Santi

According to traditional accounts, on 22 March 1888 two peasant women from Castelpetroso, Fabiana Cicchino (35, also known as Bibiana) and Serafina Valentino (34), were searching for a stray sheep at Cesa tra Santi, on the western slopes of Monte Patalecchia, when Cicchino reportedly saw an unusual light coming from a hollow in the rock. Approaching it, she is said to have seen the Sorrowful Virgin kneeling, her arms open and her gaze raised heavenward, with seven swords piercing her heart, before the body of the dead Christ. Valentino, joining her companion at the site, reportedly did not see anything at first. The apparition is said to have repeated itself ten days later, on 1 April 1888 (Easter Sunday), when Valentino too reported seeing the Virgin.

As pilgrims began arriving in increasing numbers, Bishop Francesco Macarone Palmieri of Boiano opened a canonical inquiry. According to his own testimony, when he visited the site on 26 September 1888 he himself experienced the apparition. On 23 February 1889 the bishop issued a formal declaration affirming his vision of the Sorrowful Virgin, alerted Pope Leo XIII, and established a diocesan commission of inquiry. Subsequent reported apparitions involved further clergy, including the archpriests Don Achille Ferrara of Castelpetroso and Don Nardone of Boiano. A small spring is said to have emerged near the site, soon associated with miraculous healings.

=== The Acquaderni episode ===
According to accounts published by Carlo Acquaderni in his Marian magazine Il Servo di Maria, in October 1888 his twelve-year-old son Augusto—suffering from bone tuberculosis, at that time considered incurable—was reportedly healed in Bologna. Carlo Acquaderni, brother of Giovanni Acquaderni (a count and one of the founders of Catholic Action in 1867), is said to have prayed to Our Lady of Sorrows and bathed his son with water from the Castelpetroso spring, sent to him by post by the archpriest Don Achille Ferrara. Father and son first travelled to Castelpetroso only in January 1889, when Augusto in turn reportedly experienced a vision of the Virgin. Following this episode, Acquaderni—together with Bishop Macarone Palmieri—became one of the principal promoters of the construction of a sanctuary on the site. A fundraising committee was established, comprising the bishop, the archpriest of Castelpetroso, Acquaderni, and others; the journal Il Servo di Maria served as the official organ for collecting donations.

=== Construction: three generations of the Gualandi family ===
The project was entrusted to the engineer Francesco Gualandi (1821–1902), a leading figure of the Italian Gothic Revival. The foundation stone was laid on 28 September 1890 in the presence of between thirty and forty thousand faithful and Bishop Macarone Palmieri.

Work continued for over eighty years and spanned three generations of the same Gualandi family of Bologna: Francesco Gualandi was succeeded by his son Giuseppe Gualandi (1866–1944), and subsequently by his grandson Francesco Gualandi (1895–1992), who finally saw the project completed. Economic difficulties, the death of Bishop Macarone Palmieri on 27 February 1897, and the disruption caused by both World Wars meant that the perimeter walls were not finished until 1950.

From 1946, under the ministry of Alberto Carinci—first apostolic administrator (1943–1948) of the Campobasso–Boiano diocese while remaining bishop of Isernia-Venafro, and from 28 April 1948 until his retirement on 31 January 1977 titular bishop of Campobasso–Boiano—work resumed at pace: the side chapels, the great dome, the interior decorations (altars, mosaics, flooring), and the Via Matris linking the basilica to the apparition site were completed. The basilica was built entirely of local stone, hand-carved by Molise stonemasons—including the brothers Mario, Giuffrida, and Pasquale Chiocchio of Oratino—and by the Pasquini brothers of Pietrasanta, Tuscany.

=== Consecration and papal recognition ===
The sanctuary was solemnly consecrated on 21 September 1975, in the presence of Archbishop Carinci and of all the bishops of Molise: Mons. Achille Palmerini (Isernia-Venafro), Mons. Pietro Santoro (Larino e Termoli), and Mons. Enzio D'Antonio (Trivento).

Two years earlier, on 6 December 1973, Pope Paul VI had proclaimed Our Lady of Sorrows of Castelpetroso heavenly patron of Molise. On 19 March 1995, the solemnity of Saint Joseph, Pope John Paul II visited the shrine. During the pontificate of Pope Francis, on 24 June 2013 the church was elevated to the dignity of minor basilica by decree signed by Cardinal Antonio Cañizares Llovera, Prefect of the Congregation for Divine Worship and the Discipline of the Sacraments; on 5 July 2014, the same Pope made a pilgrimage to Castelpetroso, meeting the youth of Abruzzo and Molise on the basilica's forecourt.

=== Pastoral care ===
From 1993 to 2005 the sanctuary was entrusted to the Franciscan Friars of the Immaculate and the Franciscan Sisters of the Immaculate. Care subsequently passed to the Conventual Franciscans. Pastoral care is currently entrusted to secular priests of the Archdiocese of Campobasso–Boiano, assisted by the Servants of the Lord and the Virgin of Matará (SSVM).

== Architecture ==
=== Exterior ===
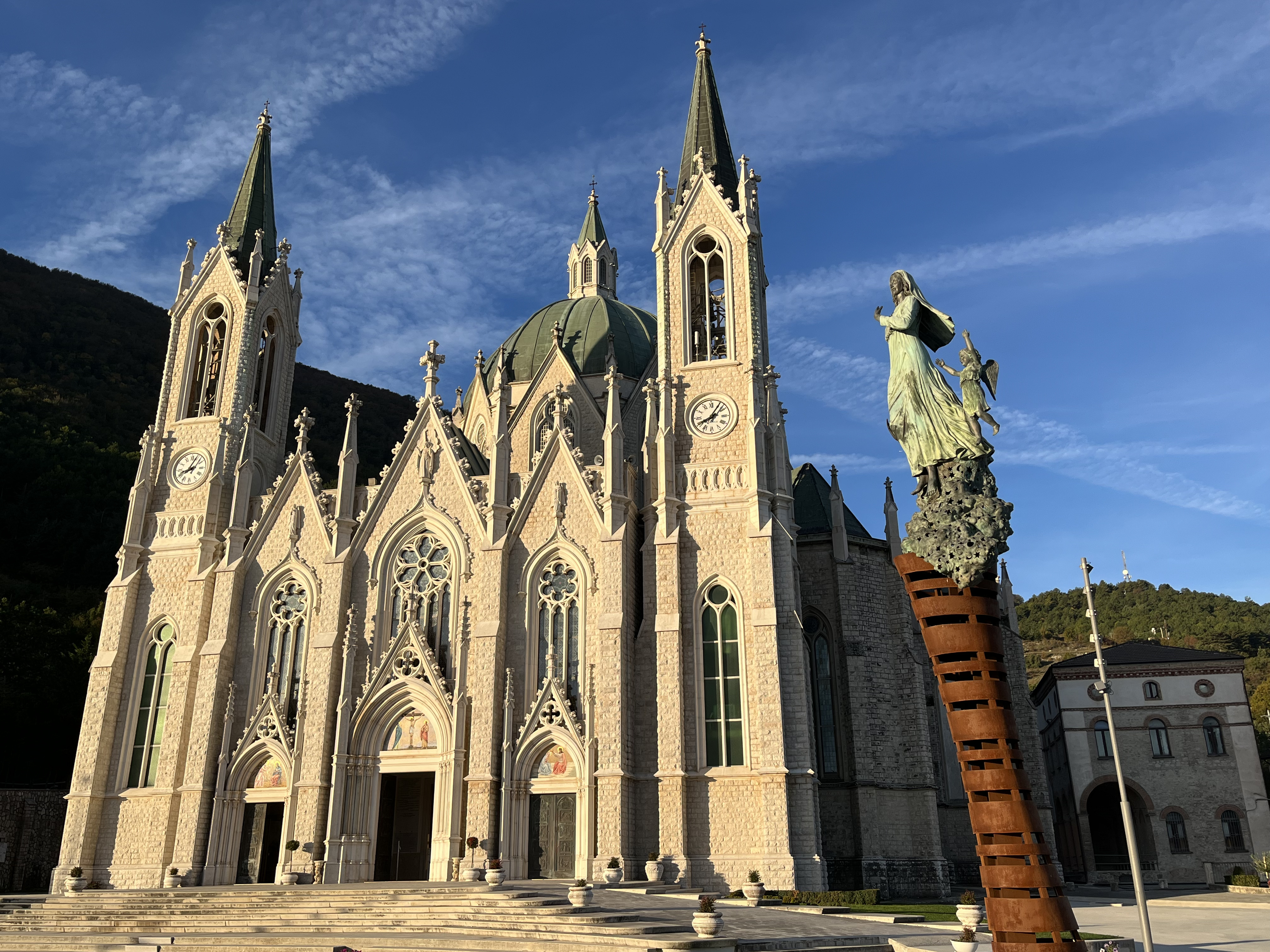
Main facade of the basilica, with three splayed portals and two flanking bell towers

The basilica, rising 55 m (180 ft) at the apex of the cross atop its dome and covering a total surface of approximately 10,000 m^{2} (110,000 sq ft) (with an interior surface of about 2,800 m^{2} (30,000 sq ft)), was built in the French Gothic Revival style on the western slopes of Monte Patalecchia at an elevation of approximately 806 m (2,644 ft).

The main façade is divided horizontally into three sections of equal height, each topped by a triangular gable; in the centre opens a four-light window, flanked by two three-light windows. Below are three splayed portals, decorated with mosaic lunettes representing—at the centre—Christ on the Cross between Mary and John the Apostle, and—on the sides—the Annunciation and the Coronation of the Virgin. The bronze portal doors depict scenes from the Old and New Testaments.

The façade is framed by two square-plan bell towers articulated in two superposed orders of mullioned windows, the lower order being taller. The bells were cast by the Pontifical Marinelli Foundry of Agnone.

=== Plan and interior ===
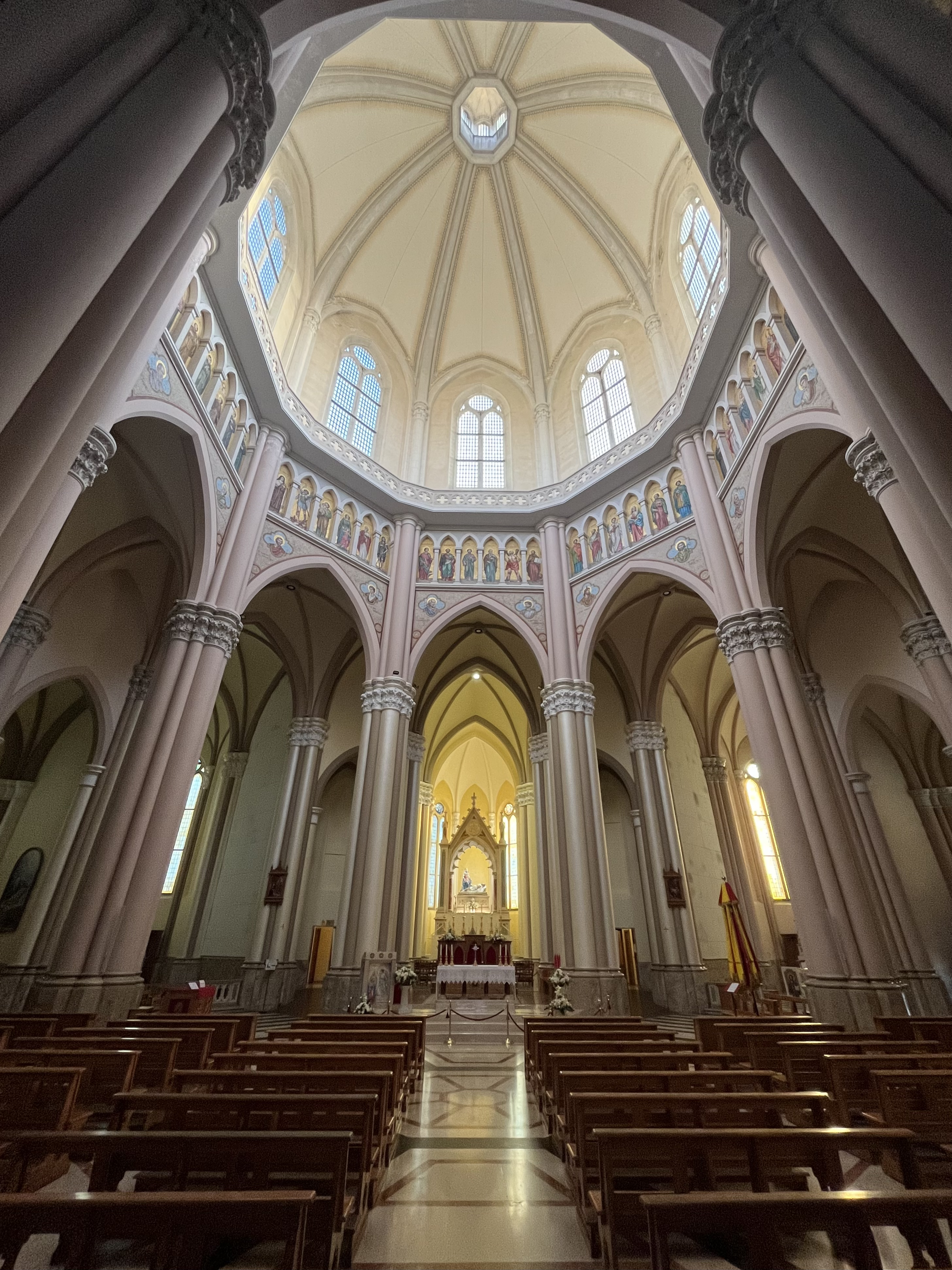
Interior view of the radial octagonal nave

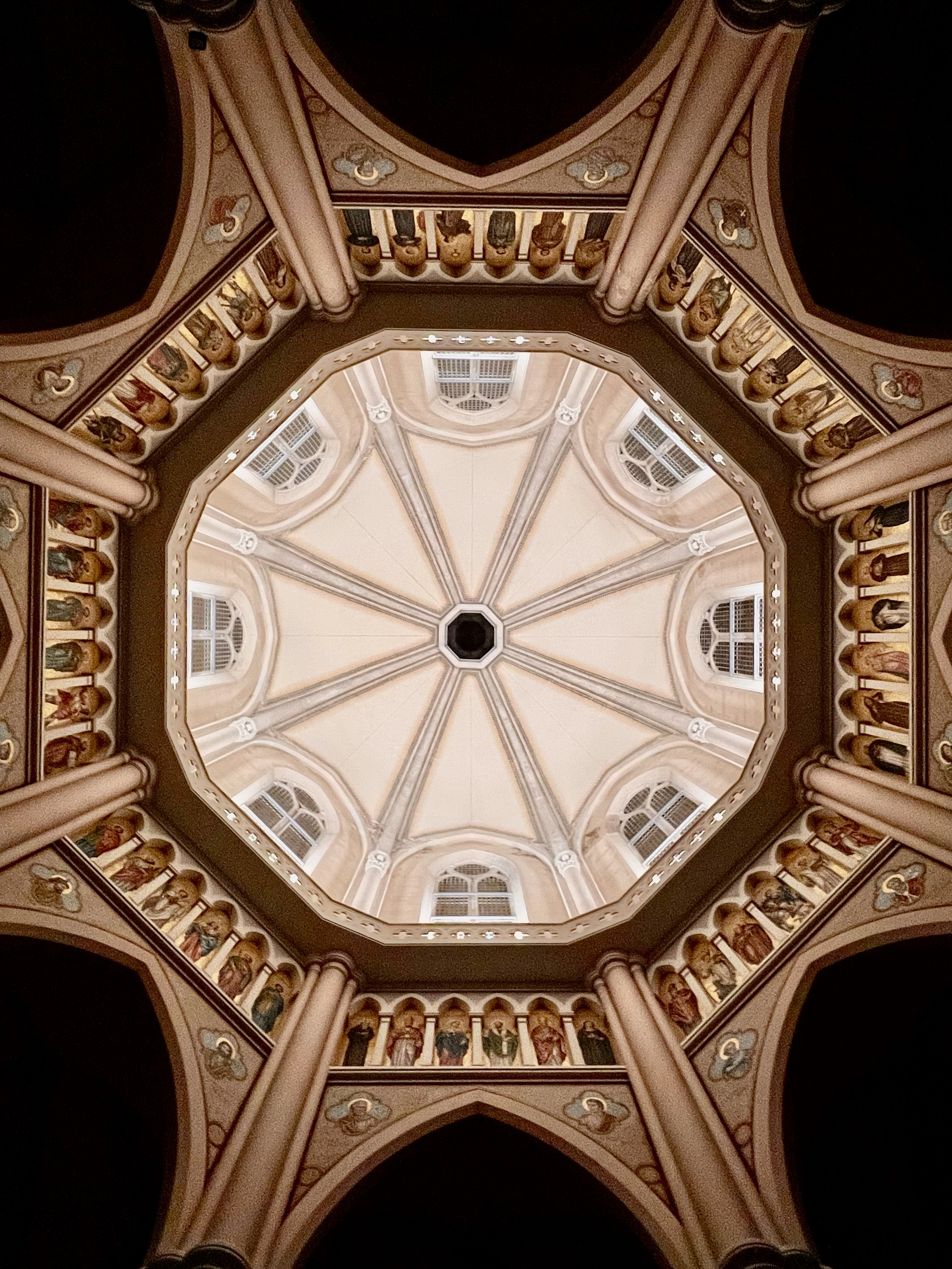
The dome seen from below

The interior is distinguished by a radial central plan with seven arms, symbolically corresponding to the seven swords that, in traditional iconography, pierce the heart of Our Lady of Sorrows. The central octagonal hall is covered by the great dome and surrounded by an ambulatory with cross vaulting, onto which open seven chapels dedicated to the seven sorrows: three on the left, three on the right, and a seventh—the main chapel—at the rear, corresponding to the sixth sorrow. Opposite the main chapel, on the axis of the principal portal, opens the entrance of the basilica.

The three portals do not open directly onto the ambulatory but onto a single-bay narthex divided into three aisles by round arches.

=== Main chapel and cult statue ===
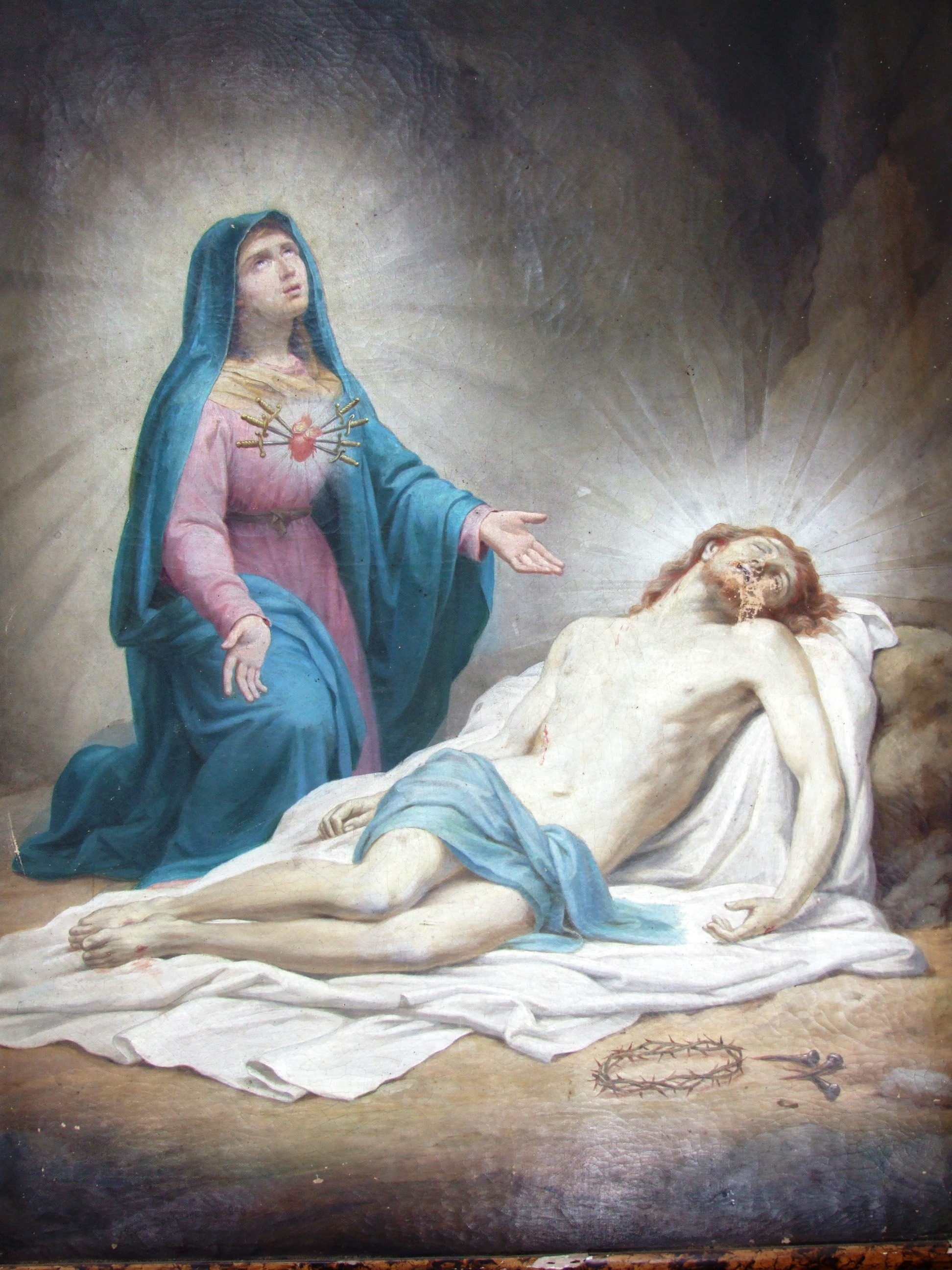
Oil painting of Our Lady of Sorrows of Castelpetroso, attributed to Giovanni Battista Gagliardi (1838–1924), preserved in the sacristy

In November 1894 the people of Colle Sannita, grateful for graces received, donated to the sanctuary a wooden statue clothed in fabric vestments, modeled on a painting by Professor Gagliardi and conforming to the description provided by the first visionary Fabiana Cicchino. The statue originally consisted only of a wooden head and hands; in 1963, following a fire, the statue was restored and became fully sculpted throughout.

=== Paintings and mosaics ===
Each of the six lateral chapels houses an altar in polychrome marble surmounted by a canvas by Amedeo Trivisonno depicting one of the Seven Sorrows of Mary. Trivisonno also painted the canvases of the Resurrection and the Assumption of Mary in the narthex.

The mosaics decorating the base of the dome represent the saints most venerated in Molise. The Gothic Revival stained glass windows and rose windows depict scenes from the life of the Virgin and the titles under which she is venerated.

=== Pipe organ ===
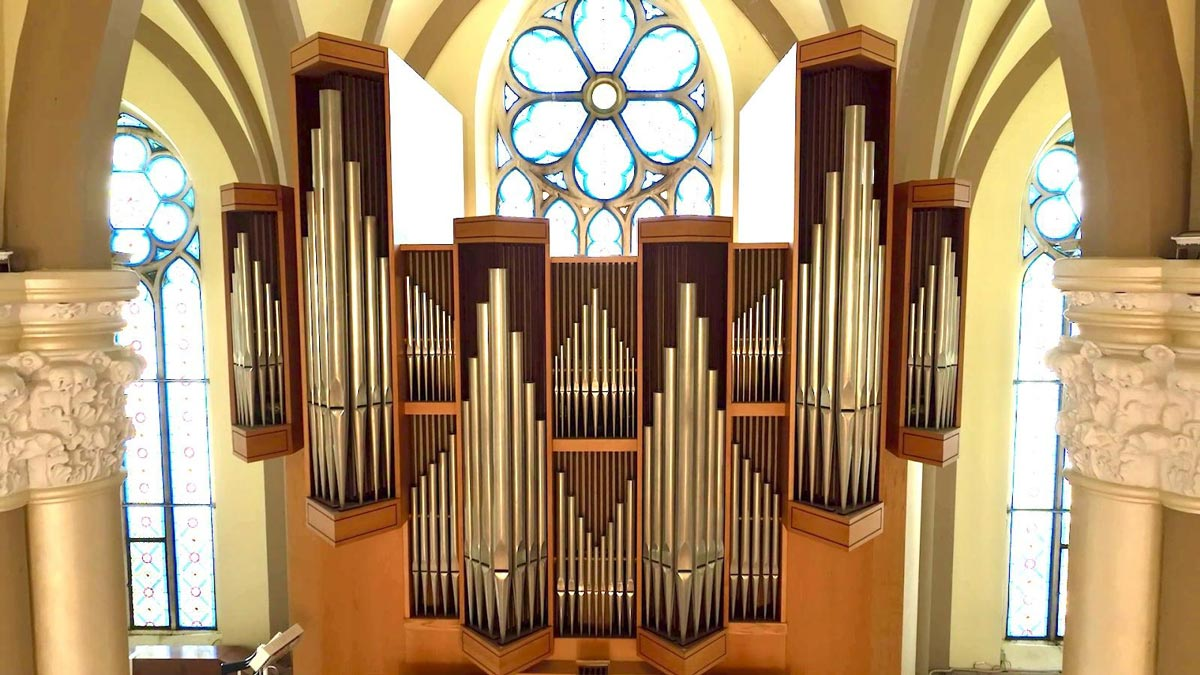
The 1993 Ruffatti pipe organ on the choir loft

The pipe organ, located on the choir loft at the entrance wall, was built in 1993 by the Fratelli Ruffatti firm of Padua. The instrument has 1,778 pipes and uses mixed transmission—mechanical for manuals and pedalboard, electric for stops. The console has two 58-note keyboards and a 32-note concave-radial pedalboard.

=== Relic of Saint Gabriel of Our Lady of Sorrows ===
Since 29 October 1994, the seventh chapel has housed a relic (a tooth) of Saint Gabriel of Our Lady of Sorrows.

== Outdoor devotional sites ==
=== Via Matris ===
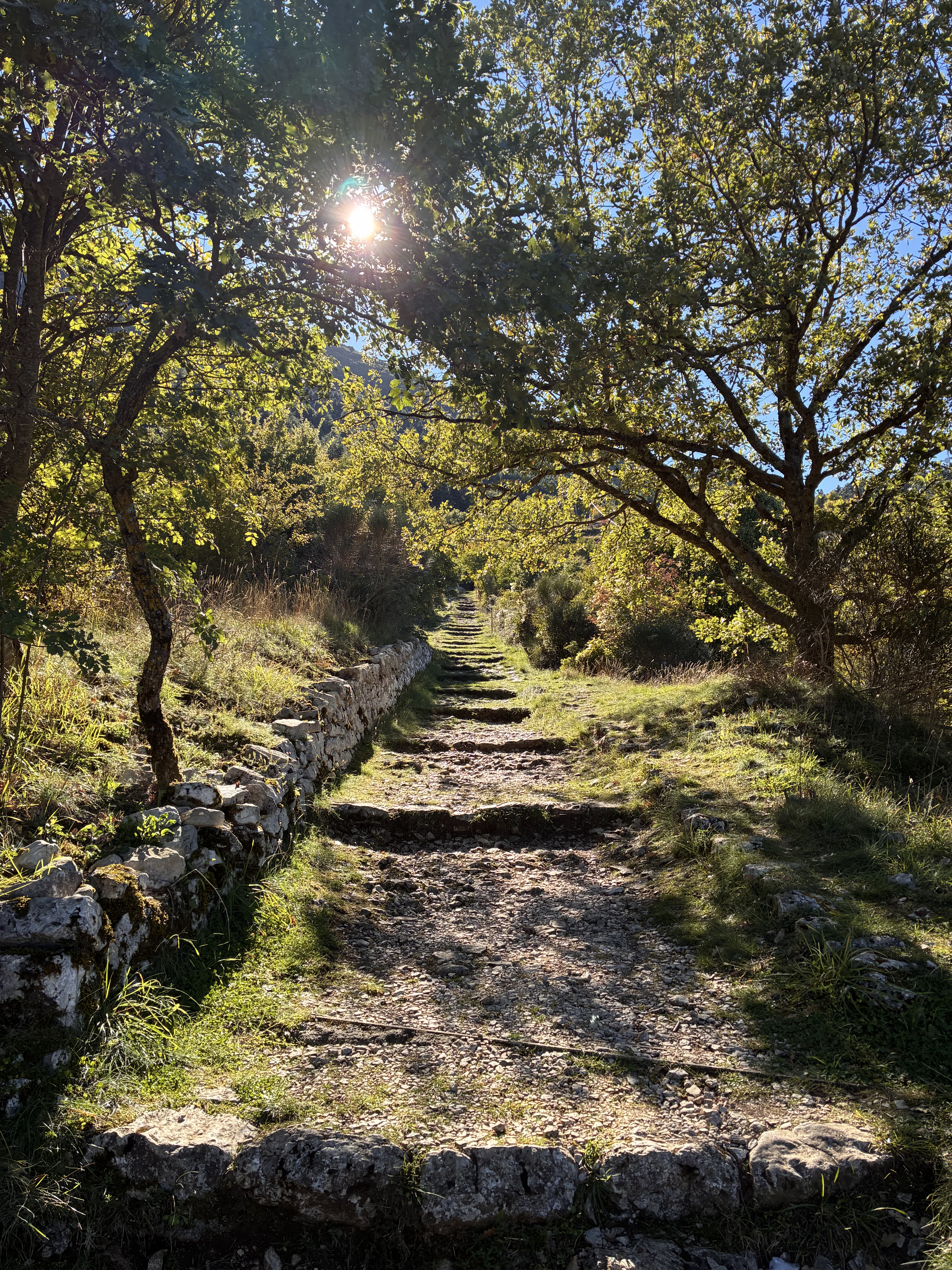
The Via Matris devotional path connecting the basilica to the apparition site

The Via Matris is an outdoor devotional path approximately 750 m (2,460 ft) long, winding along the mountainside and connecting the basilica to the apparition site. Inaugurated on 27 September 1947, it is divided into seven stations corresponding to the Seven Sorrows of Mary. Each station, originally marked by a copper aedicula set within a masonry niche, today features a unique bronze sculptural group. The sixth station—La Deposizione (The Deposition), a bronze work by sculptor Alessandro Caetani dating from the 1990s—was the subject of a feature article in the French newspaper Le Figaro.

=== Apparition Chapel ===
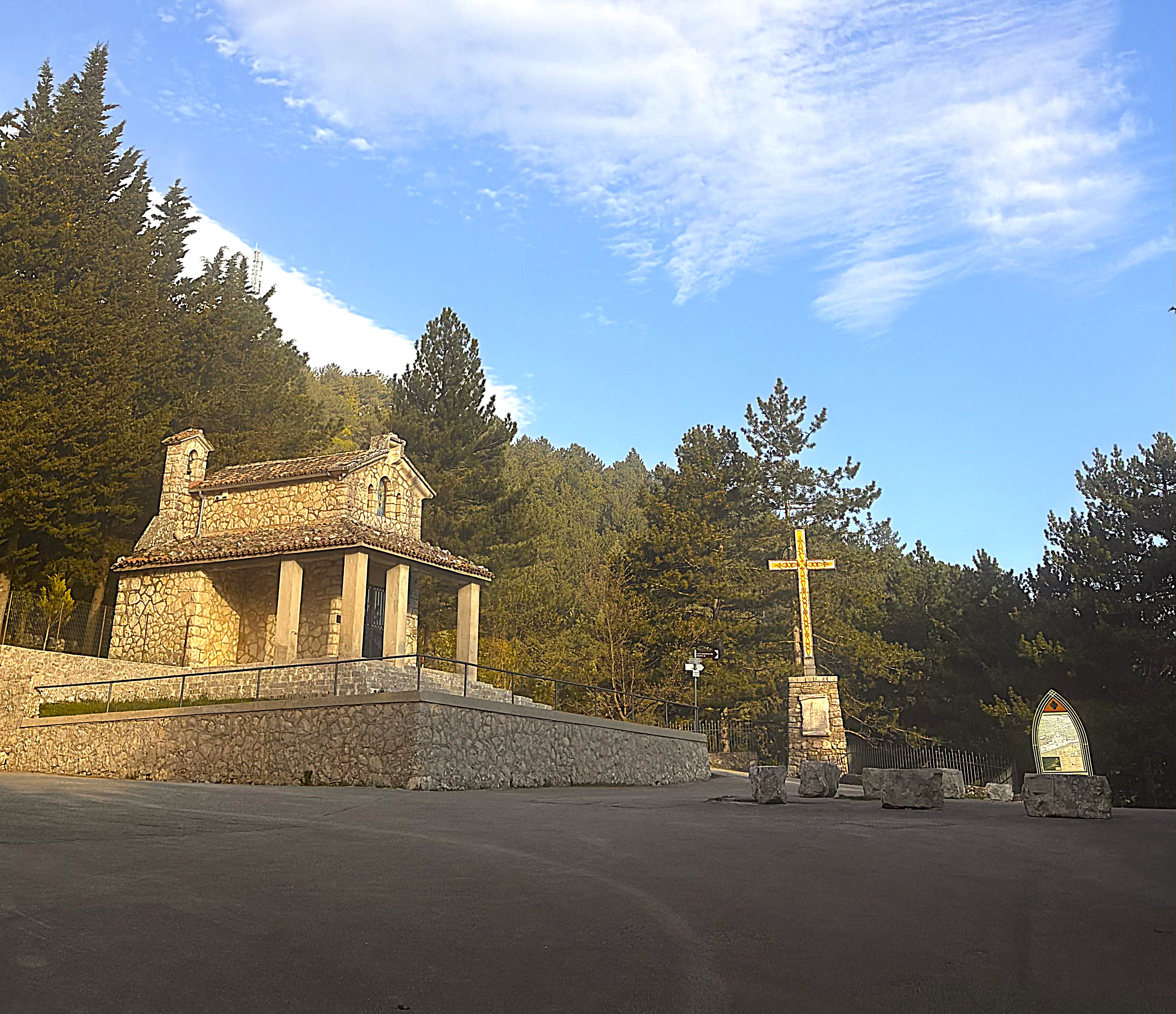
The square in front of the Apparition Chapel

The Apparition Chapel, built near the site of the first reported apparition, was blessed on 27 September 1947 by Bishop Alberto Carinci. Built entirely of stone, it today houses a mosaic depicting Our Lady of Sorrows of Castelpetroso. The original 1948 painting by Mario Barberis—depicting the same iconography—is currently preserved in the sanctuary's sacristy.

=== Cesa tra Santi sculptural complex ===
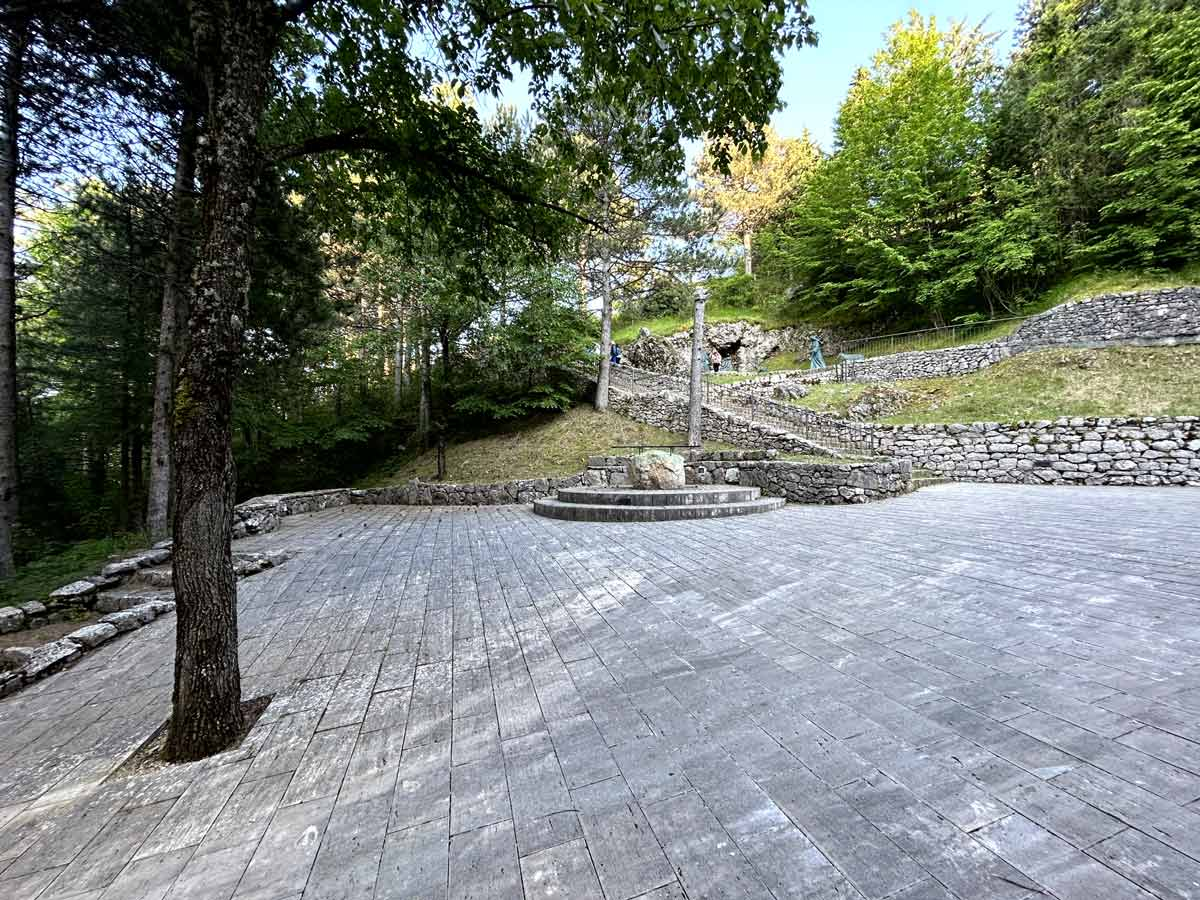
The square below the apparition site; the rock of the 1888 apparition is visible in the background, while the miraculous spring lies further to the right

Below the square, between the seventh station of the Via Matris and the Apparition Chapel, stands the bronze complex Cesa tra Santi, comprising a representation of Our Lady of Sorrows with the dead Christ by Urbano Buratti (1975), supplemented in 2002 by figures of the two young peasant women and the lambs by sculptor Alex Kostner.

=== Miraculous spring ===
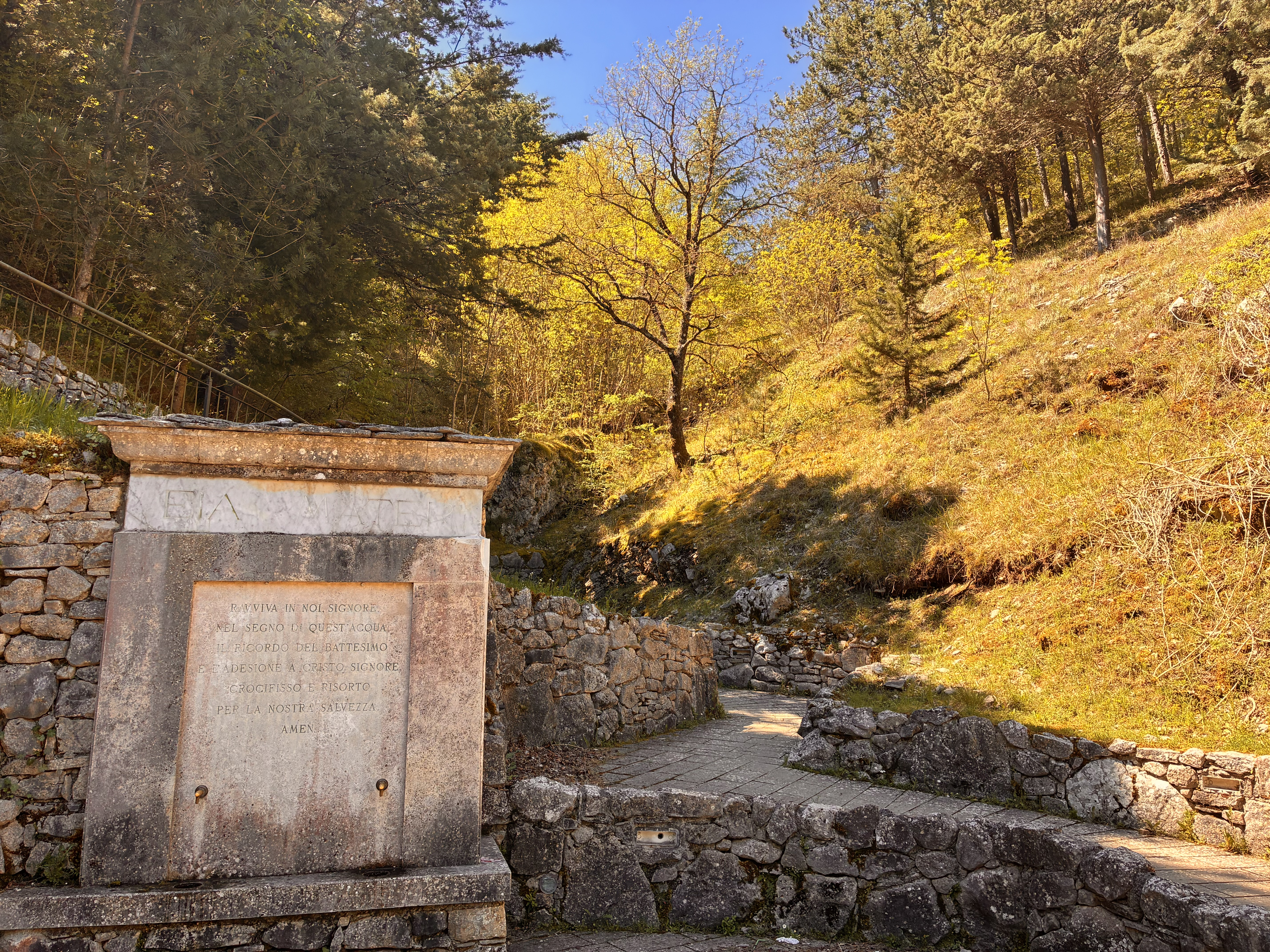
The miraculous spring at the apparition site

At the foot of the rock where the first apparition is said to have occurred, a spring still flows. Its water—associated with the healing of Augusto Acquaderni—remains an object of pilgrim devotion.

== Veneration ==
Our Lady of Sorrows of Castelpetroso is the patron saint of the Molise region by proclamation of Pope Paul VI (6 December 1973). The principal feast days celebrated at the sanctuary are:

- 22 March – anniversary of the first apparition (1888)
- Fourth Sunday of September – anniversary of the laying of the foundation stone (28 September 1890)

The sanctuary is a destination for annual pilgrimages and forms part of the Jubilee itinerary of the Archdiocese of Campobasso–Boiano.

== Culture ==
The sanctuary has been the subject of features by international outlets including L'Osservatore Romano, Le Figaro, the Brazilian network TV Évangelizar, Rai Italia, and Rai 1's programme Camper.

It is popularly referred to as the "Little Lourdes of Italy" (Piccola Lourdes d'Italia), in reference to the French Marian shrine.

== Historical gallery ==
The following gallery presents historical iconographic material related to the foundation and early history of the sanctuary.

Historical iconography of the Sanctuary of Castelpetroso

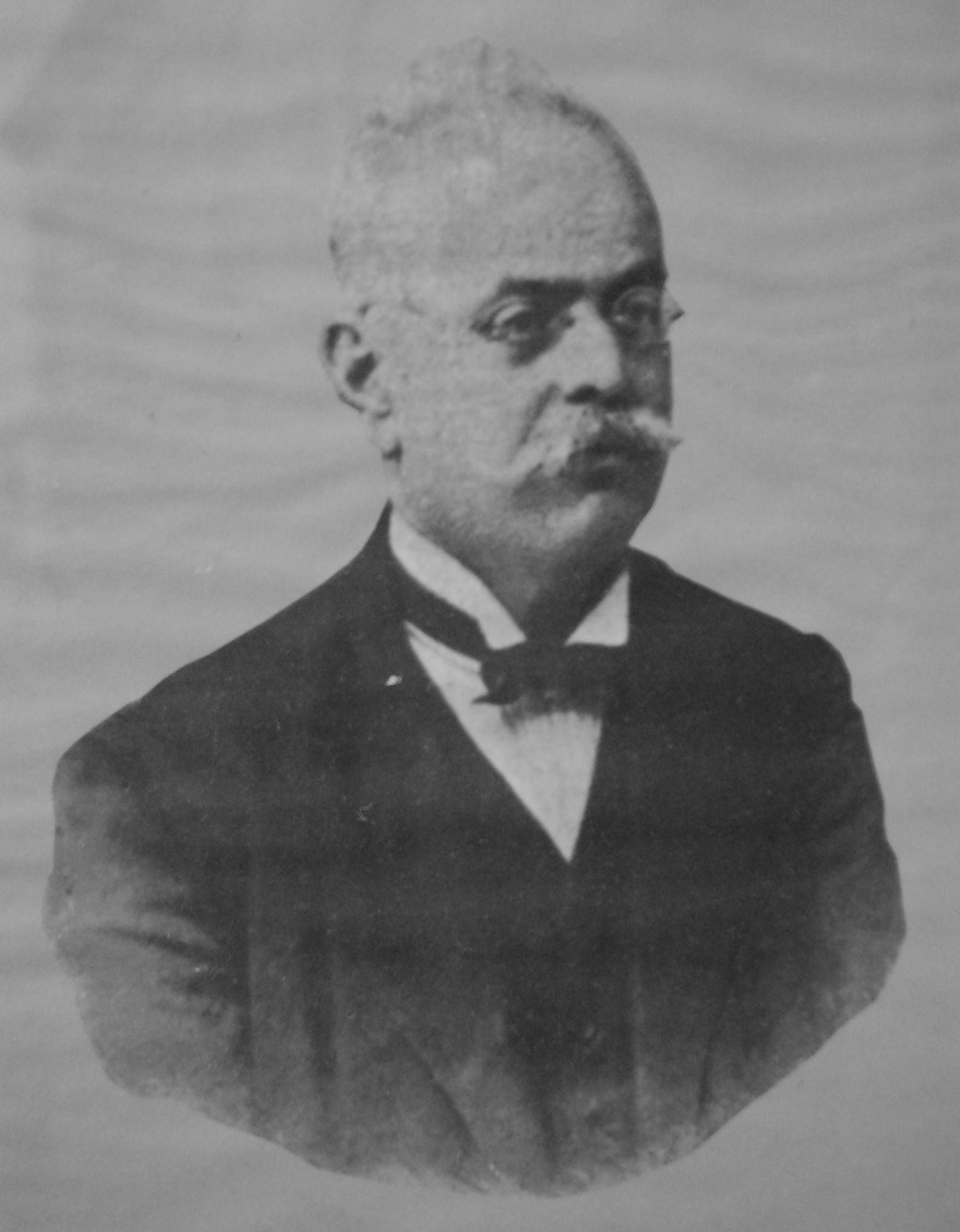
Carlo Acquaderni, director of Il Servo di Maria and principal promoter of the sanctuary's construction

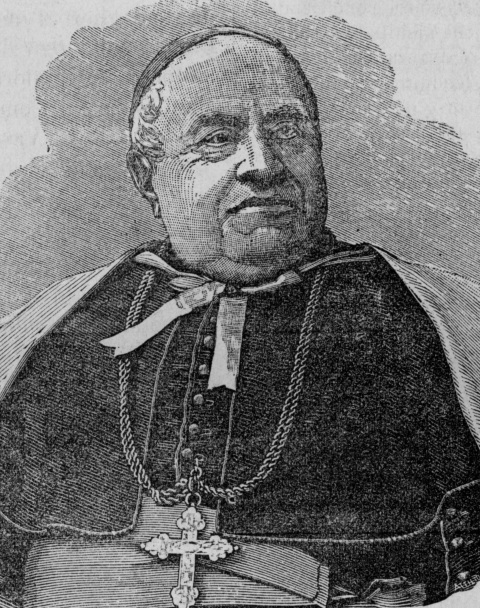
Mons. Francesco Macarone Palmieri (1817–1897), bishop of Boiano, who reported experiencing the apparition himself in 1888

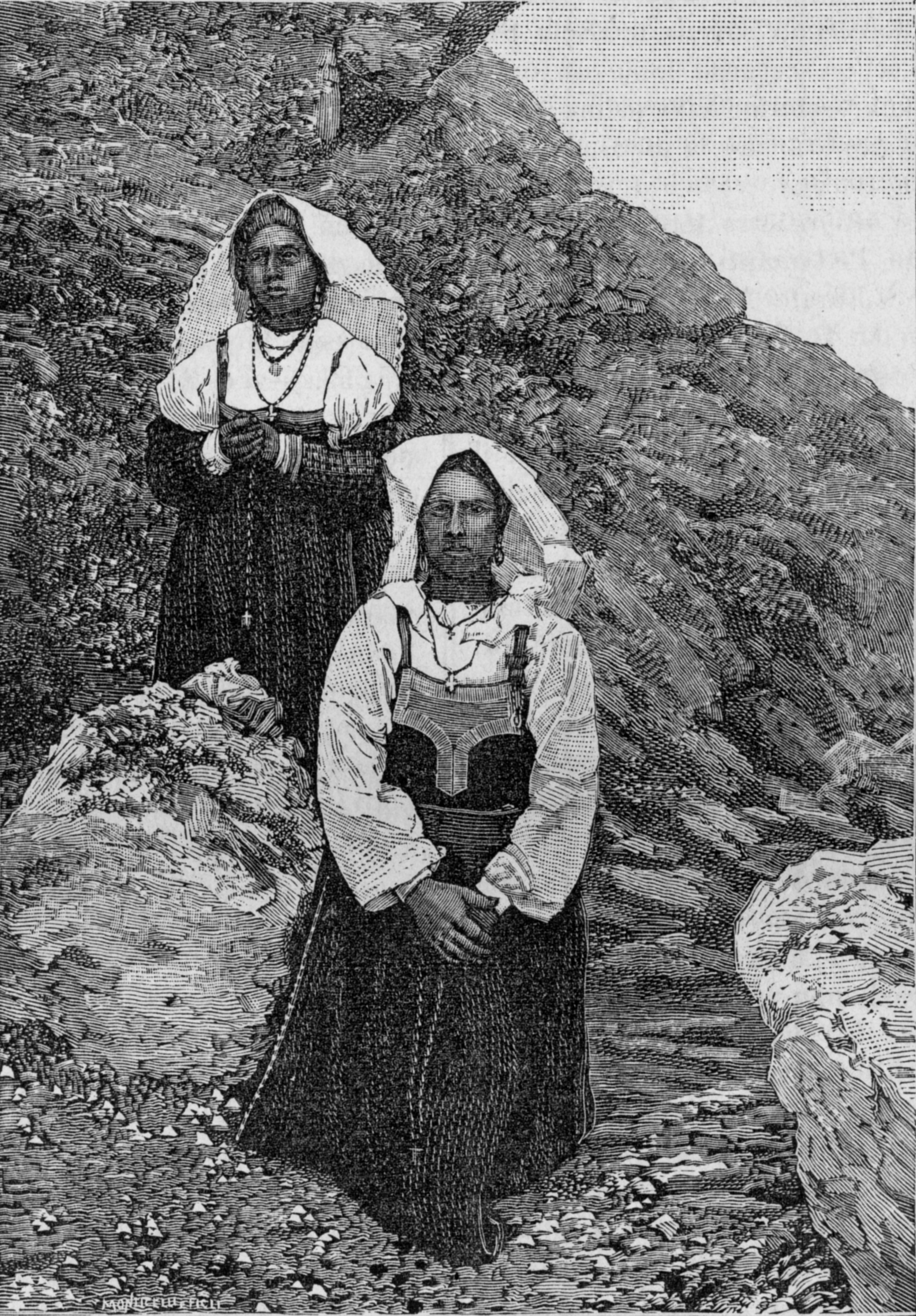
Fabiana Cicchino and Serafina Valentino, the two peasant women visionaries

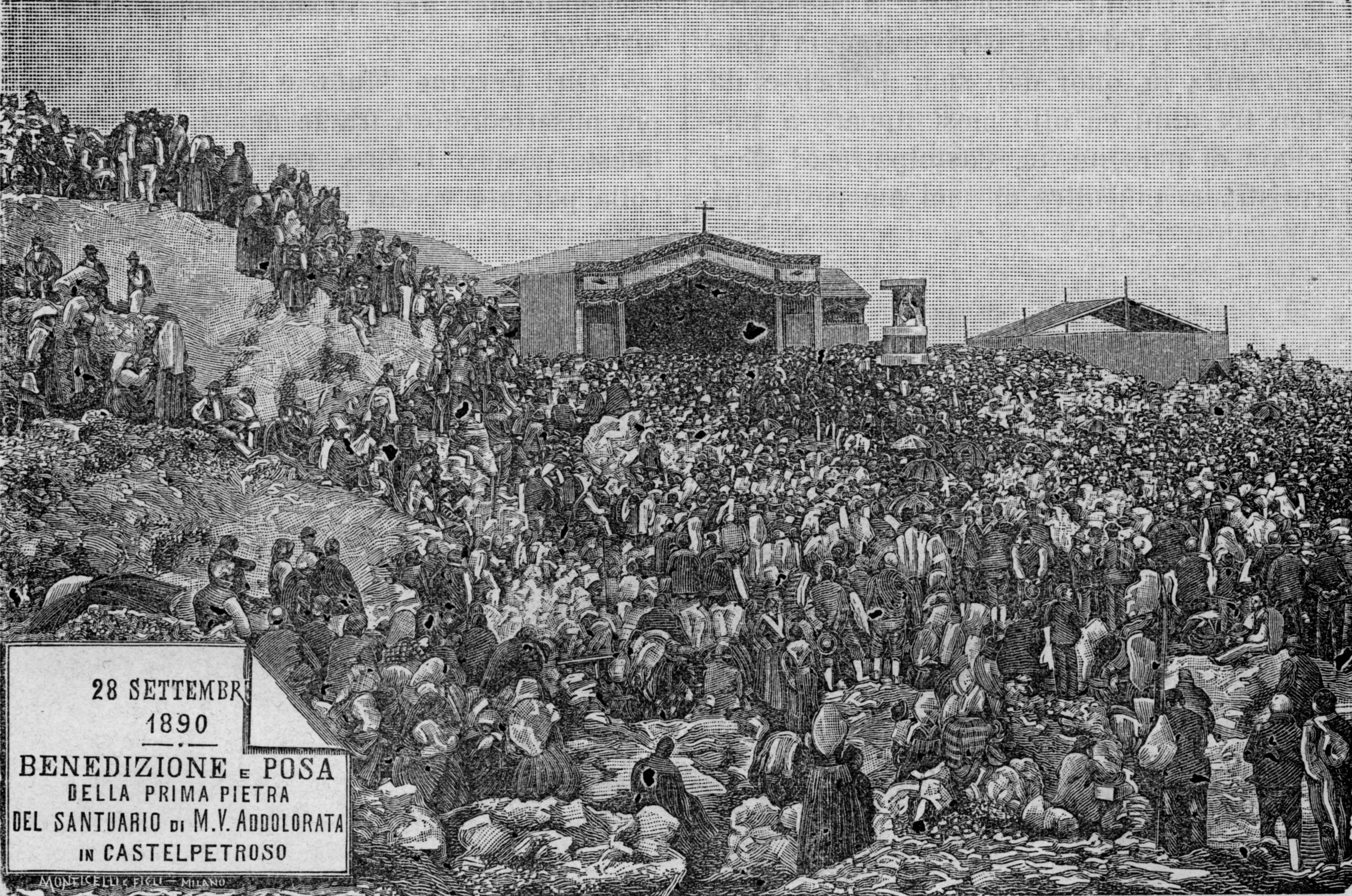
Devotional print of the laying of the foundation stone, 28 September 1890

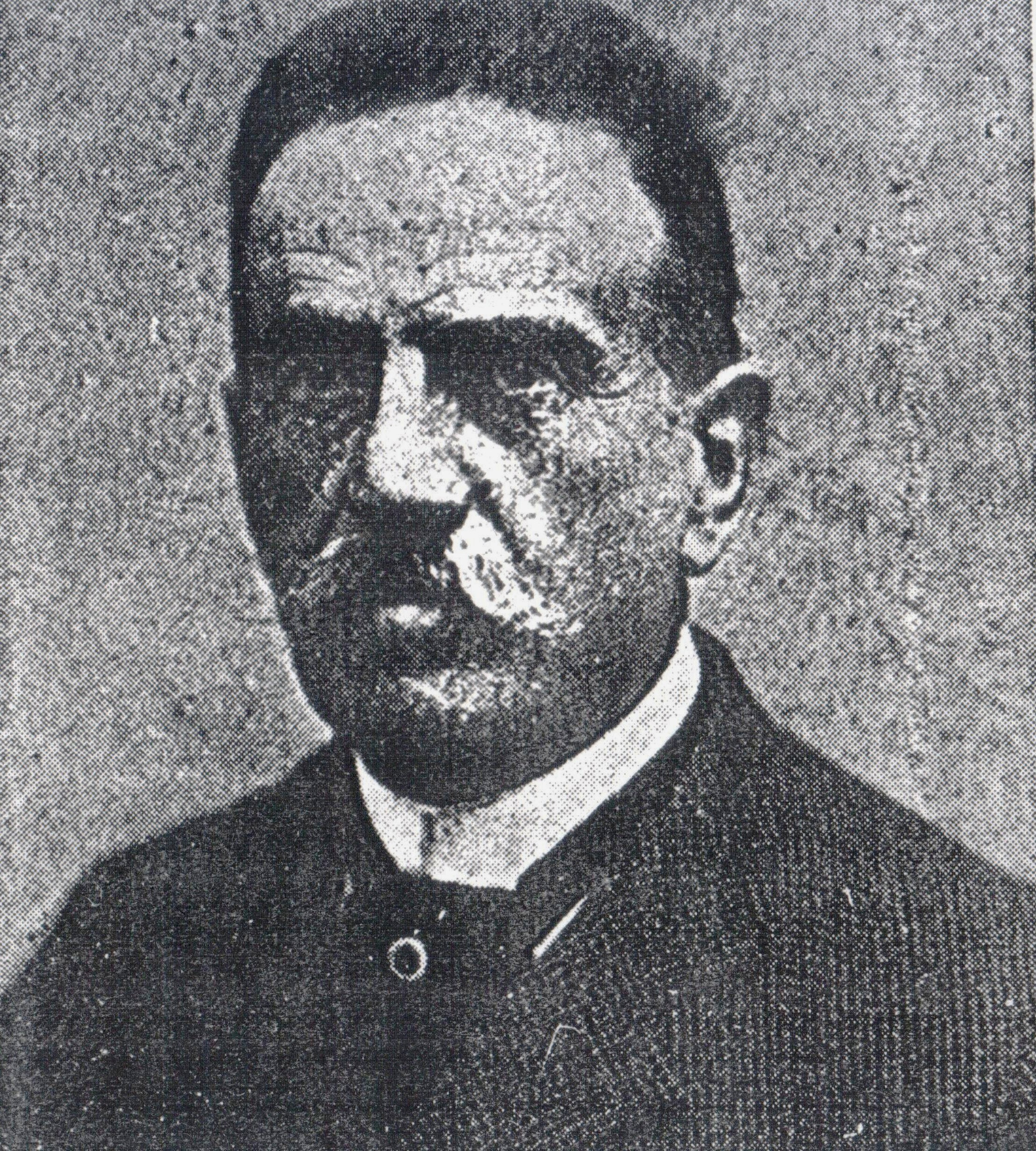
Francesco Gualandi (1821–1902), original architect of the basilica

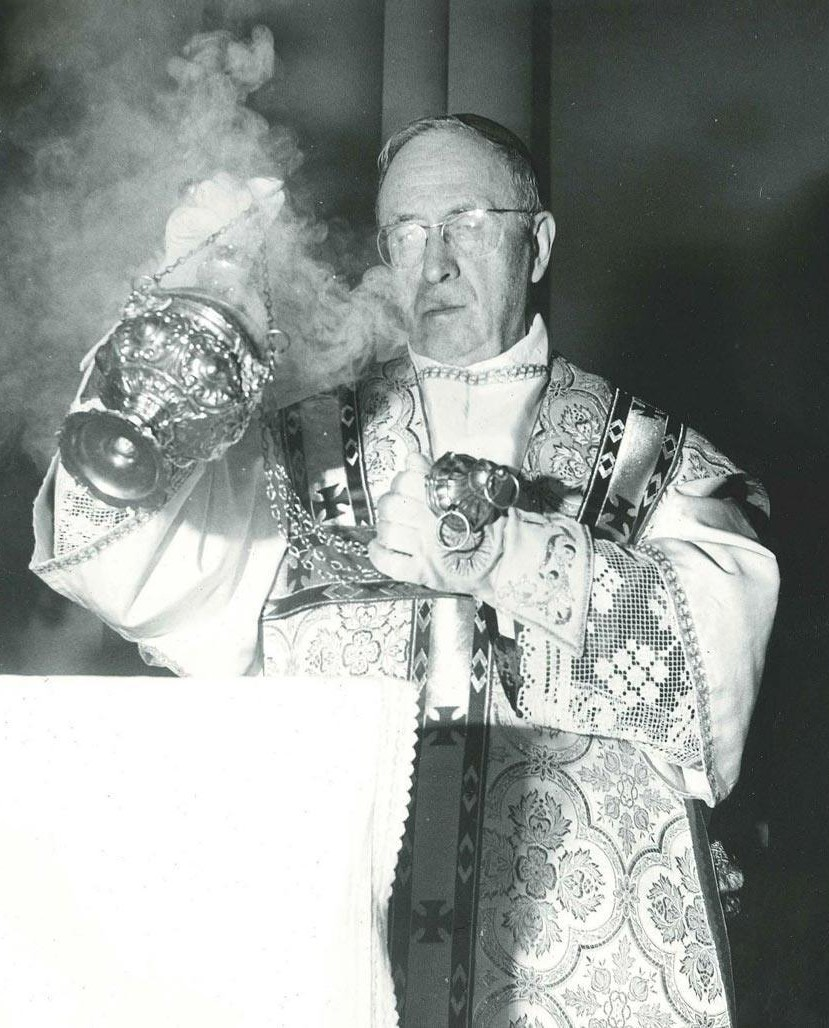
Mons. Alberto Carinci, bishop of Campobasso–Boiano (1948–1977), under whose ministry the basilica was completed

== See also ==
- Castelpetroso
- Marian apparition
- Roman Catholic Archdiocese of Campobasso–Boiano
- Gothic Revival architecture
- Seven Sorrows of Mary
