= Pesca (disambiguation) =

Pesca is a town and municipality in Colombia.

Pesca may also refer to:

- Pešca, a town in Montenegro
- La Pesca, a town in Mexico
- Mike Pesca (born 1971), American radio journalist
- Pesca (footballer) (Jorge González Moral, born 1992), Spanish footballer
- "La pesca", 1835 song from Soirées musicales (Rossini)

== See also ==
- Pesco (disambiguation)
- Pesche, a municipality of the Province of Isernia, Molise, Italy
