= Roccamandolfi =

- Comune
- Comune di Roccamandolfi
- Roccamandolfi within the Province of Isernia

- Location within Italy Location within Molise
- Coordinates: 41°30′N 14°21′E
- Country: Italy
- Region: Molise
- Province: Isernia (IS)

Government
  - Mayor: Giacomo Lombardi

Area
  - Total: 53.67 km^{2} (20.72 sq mi)
- Elevation: 850 m (2,790 ft)

Population (30 September 2016)
  - Total: 926
  - Density: 17.3/km^{2} (44.7/sq mi)
- Demonym: Roccolani
- Time zone: UTC+1 (CET)
  - Summer (DST): UTC+2 (CEST)
- Postal code: 86098
- Dialing code: 0865
- Website: Official website

Roccamandolfi is a comune (municipality) in the Province of Isernia in the Italian region Molise, located about 25 kilometres (16 mi) southwest of Campobasso and about 15 kilometres (9 mi) southeast of Isernia.

Roccamandolfi borders the following municipalities: Cantalupo nel Sannio, Castelpizzuto, Gallo Matese, Letino, Longano, San Gregorio Matese, San Massimo and Santa Maria del Molise.
