= Castelpizzuto =

- Comune
- Comune di Castelpizzuto
- Location within Italy Location within Molise
- Coordinates: 41°31′N 14°18′E
- Country: Italy
- Region: Molise
- Province: Province of Isernia (IS)

Area
  - Total: 15.2 km^{2} (5.9 sq mi)

Population (Dec. 2004)
  - Total: 156
  - Density: 10.3/km^{2} (26.6/sq mi)
- Time zone: UTC+1 (CET)
  - Summer (DST): UTC+2 (CEST)
- Postal code: 86090
- Dialing code: 0865

Castelpizzuto is a comune (municipality) in the Province of Isernia in the Italian region Molise, located about 30 kilometres (19 mi) west of Campobasso and about 11 kilometres (7 mi) southeast of Isernia. As of 31 December 2004, it had a population of 156 and an area of 15.2 square kilometres (5.9 mi^{2}).

Castelpizzuto borders the following municipalities: Castelpetroso, Longano, Pettoranello del Molise, Roccamandolfi, Santa Maria del Molise.

== Demographic evolution ==
Historical population

Year	Pop.	±%
1861	790	—
1871	773	−2.2%
1881	727	−6.0%
1901	605	−16.8%
1911	548	−9.4%

Year	Pop.	±%
1921	576	+5.1%
1931	429	−25.5%
1936	435	+1.4%
1951	401	−7.8%
1961	320	−20.2%

Year	Pop.	±%
1971	205	−35.9%
1981	185	−9.8%
1991	134	−27.6%
2001	143	+6.7%

Source: Data from ISTAT
