= Civitanova del Sannio =

- Comune
- Comune di Civitanova del Sannio
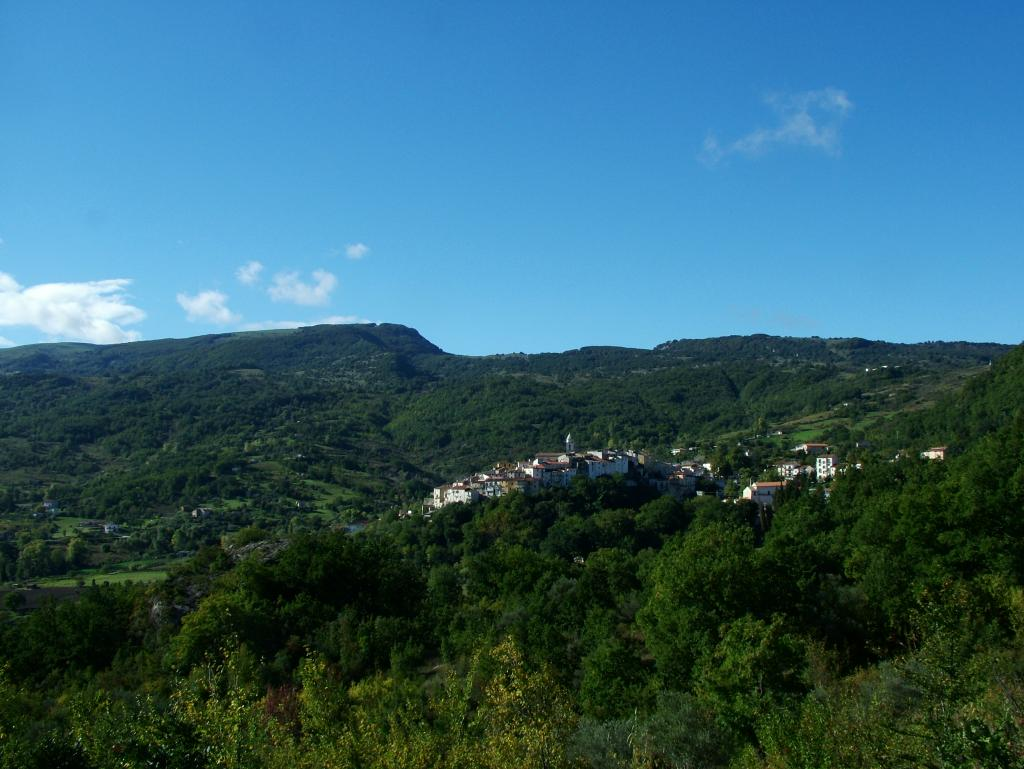
- View of Civitanova del Sannio

- Location within Italy Location within Molise
- Coordinates: 41°40′N 14°24′E
- Country: Italy
- Region: Molise
- Province: Isernia (IS)

Government
  - Mayor: Roberta Ciampittiello

Area
  - Total: 50.47 km^{2} (19.49 sq mi)
- Elevation: 656 m (2,152 ft)

Population (30 June 2017)
  - Total: 914
  - Density: 18.1/km^{2} (46.9/sq mi)
- Demonym: Civitanovesi
- Time zone: UTC+1 (CET)
  - Summer (DST): UTC+2 (CEST)
- Postal code: 86094
- Dialing code: 0865
- Website: Official website

Civitanova del Sannio is a comune (municipality) in the Province of Isernia in the Italian region Molise, located about 25 kilometres (16 mi) northwest of Campobasso and about 15 kilometres (9 mi) northeast of Isernia.

== Geography ==
Civitanova del Sannio borders the following municipalities: Bagnoli del Trigno, Chiauci, Duronia, Frosolone, Pescolanciano, Pietrabbondante, Poggio Sannita, Salcito, Sessano del Molise.
