= Chiauci =

- Comune
- Comune di Chiauci
- Location within Italy Location within Molise
- Coordinates: 41°41′N 14°23′E
- Country: Italy
- Region: Molise
- Province: Isernia (IS)

Government
  - Mayor: Antonio Sferra (lista civica Chiauci [Independent])

Area
  - Total: 15.85 km^{2} (6.12 sq mi)
- Elevation: 879 or 868 m (2,884 or 2,848 ft)

Population (December 31st 2025)
  - Total: 189
  - Density: 11.9/km^{2} (30.9/sq mi)
- Demonym: Chiaucesi
- Time zone: UTC+1 (CET)
  - Summer (DST): UTC+2 (CEST)
- Postal code: 86090 / 86097
- Dialing code: 0865
- Patron saint: St. George
- Website: Official website

Chiauci is a comune (municipality) in the Province of Isernia in the Italian region Molise, located about 25 kilometres (16 mi) northwest of Campobasso and about 15 kilometres (9 mi) northeast of Isernia.

Chiauci borders the following municipalities: Civitanova del Sannio, Pescolanciano, Pietrabbondante, Sessano del Molise

Chiauci has a seismic risk of 2 and is in the climate zone E. According official Italian government data just out of the 190 citizens a total of 6 are foreigners.
