= Pescolanciano =

- Comune
- Comune di Pescolanciano
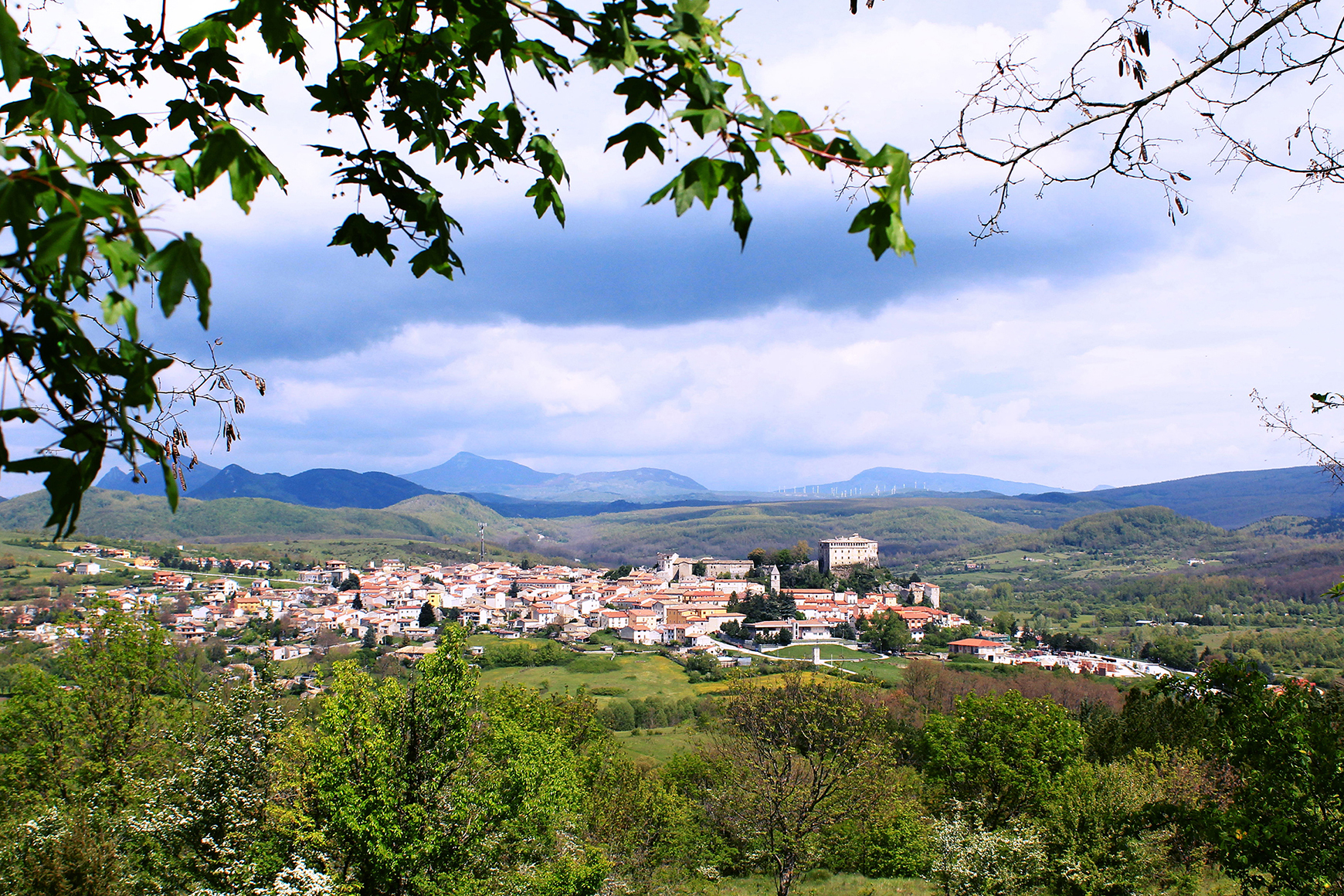
- View of Pescolanciano

- Location within Italy Location within Molise
- Coordinates: 41°41′N 14°20′E
- Country: Italy
- Region: Molise
- Province: Isernia (IS)
- Frazioni: lLa Castagna

Government
  - Mayor: Manolo Sacco

Area
  - Total: 34.73 km^{2} (13.41 sq mi)
- Elevation: 800 m (2,600 ft)

Population (30 September 2016)
  - Total: 847
  - Density: 24.4/km^{2} (63.2/sq mi)
- Demonym: Pescolancianesi
- Time zone: UTC+1 (CET)
  - Summer (DST): UTC+2 (CEST)
- Postal code: 86097
- Dialing code: 0865
- Website: Official website

Pescolanciano is a comune (municipality) in the Province of Isernia in the Italian region Molise, located about 30 kilometres (19 mi) northwest of Campobasso and about 12 kilometres (7 mi) northeast of Isernia.

Pescolanciano borders the following municipalities: Agnone, Carovilli, Chiauci, Civitanova del Sannio, Miranda, Pietrabbondante, Sessano del Molise.

Sights include the Castello D'Alessandro, built perhaps around 583 during the reign of Lombard king Alboin, or later under Charlemagne. The first historical mentions are from the 13th century. Located on the spur overlooking the town, it has a massive pentagonal plan.
