= Sessano del Molise =

- Comune
- Comune di Sessano del Molise
- Location within Italy Location within Molise
- Coordinates: 41°38′N 14°20′E
- Country: Italy
- Region: Molise
- Province: Province of Isernia (IS)

Area
  - Total: 24.7 km^{2} (9.5 sq mi)

Population (Dec. 2004)
  - Total: 871
  - Density: 35.3/km^{2} (91.3/sq mi)
- Time zone: UTC+1 (CET)
  - Summer (DST): UTC+2 (CEST)
- Postal code: 86090
- Dialing code: 0865

Sessano del Molise is a comune (municipality) in the Province of Isernia in the Italian region Molise, located about 30 kilometres (19 mi) northwest of Campobasso and about 9 kilometres (6 mi) northeast of Isernia. As of 31 December 2004, it had a population of 871 and an area of 24.7 square kilometres (9.5 mi^{2}).

Sessano del Molise borders the following municipalities: Carpinone, Chiauci, Civitanova del Sannio, Frosolone, Miranda, Pesche, Pescolanciano.

== Demographic evolution ==
Historical population

Year	Pop.	±%
1861	2,244	—
1871	2,229	−0.7%
1881	2,226	−0.1%
1901	2,460	+10.5%
1911	2,098	−14.7%

Year	Pop.	±%
1921	1,959	−6.6%
1931	1,949	−0.5%
1936	1,893	−2.9%
1951	1,765	−6.8%
1961	1,498	−15.1%

Year	Pop.	±%
1971	1,166	−22.2%
1981	1,159	−0.6%
1991	1,029	−11.2%
2001	927	−9.9%

Source: Data from ISTAT

== People ==
- Carmine Pecorelli
