= Santa Maria del Molise =

- Comune
- Comune di Santa Maria del Molise
- Coat of arms

- Location within Italy Location within Molise
- Coordinates: 41°33′N 14°22′E
- Country: Italy
- Region: Molise
- Province: Isernia (IS)
- Frazioni: Cagnacci, Pagliarelle, Pizzillitti, Sant'Angelo in Grotte

Government
  - Mayor: Michele Labella (since 2020)

Area
  - Total: 17 km^{2} (6.6 sq mi)

Population (2024)
  - Total: 663
  - Density: 39/km^{2} (100/sq mi)
- Time zone: UTC+1 (CET)
  - Summer (DST): UTC+2 (CEST)
- Postal code: 86090
- Dialing code: 0865

Santa Maria del Molise is a town and comune in the Province of Isernia, in the Molise region (southern Italy). The comune borders Carpinone to the north, Roccamandolfi and Castelpizzuto to the south, Macchiagodena to the east, Castelpetroso to the west, and Cantalupo nel Sannio to the south-east.
