= San Massimo =

- Comune
- Comune di San Massimo
- Location within Italy Location within Molise
- Coordinates: 41°29′N 14°25′E
- Country: Italy
- Region: Molise
- Province: Province of Campobasso (CB)
- Frazioni: Campitello Matese

Area
  - Total: 27.6 km^{2} (10.7 sq mi)

Population (2018-01-01)
  - Total: 754
  - Density: 27.3/km^{2} (70.8/sq mi)
- Time zone: UTC+1 (CET)
  - Summer (DST): UTC+2 (CEST)
- Postal code: 86027
- Dialing code: 0874

San Massimo is a comune (municipality) in the Province of Campobasso in the Italian region Molise, located about 25 kilometres (16 mi) southwest of Campobasso, comprising 27.6 square kilometres (10.7 mi^{2}).

As of 2017, San Massimo has a population of 754.

== Etymology ==
San Massimo is named for Saint Maximus, the 3rd century Bishop of Nola whose followers fled to the region near San Massimo during the Decian Persecution of Roman Christians in 251 CE.

== History ==
From c. 500 BCE until the Roman era, the territory of modern-day San Massimo was controlled by the Samnites, an ethnic group composed of a fusion of indigenous people and iron-age era migrants from Greece and other parts of Europe. In a series of wars, known as the Samnite Wars, Rome conquered the region. Following the collapse of the Western Roman Empire, Germanic Lombards occupied the area, before they in turn were conquered by the Normans. Norman nobleman, and their descendants, first administered the region as the County of Apulia and Calabria, which later joined other Norman counties to make up the Kingdom of Sicily in 1130. When Sicily seceded in the Vespers of 1282, the mainland possessions of the Normans, including San Massimo, became the Kingdom of Naples.

The first reference to San Massimo, dating to 1113 CE, occurs in the locative surname of a Norman nobleman, De Sancto Maximo. At the time, San Massimo likely was a feudal estate, composed of a castle, the remains of which can be seen today, surrounded by farmland. The Church of Santa Maria delle Fratte was erected in the 12th century, and rebuilt on several occasions after devastating earthquakes that nearly leveled San Massimo in 1456 and 1805.

In 1815 the merger of the Kingdom of Naples, which included San Massimo, and that of Sicily led to the formation of the short lived Kingdom of Two Sicilies. In 1860, the Sardinian forces of Giuseppe Garibaldi conquered the region, leading to the formation of the Kingdom of Italy.

Many residents of San Massimo fought and died for Italy in the First World War, as commemorated in the city center by the "Monument to the Fallen of the Great War," opened in 1920.

Throughout the 19th and 20th century, a significant portion of the population emigrated overseas, especially to Canada, as well as to urban centers within Italy.

== Geography ==
San Massimo is nestled in the Matese Mountains, near Monte Miletto, the highest mountain in the region at 2,050 m. It also includes substantial amounts of lowland woods, consisting of chestnut and conifer groves, and agricultural land.

The municipality of San Massimo contains the frazione (subdivision) Campitello Matese, located at 1,450 metres (4,760 ft) above sea level, which shares its name with its ski resort, one of the foremost in Central and Southern Italy.

San Massimo borders the following municipalities: Bojano, Cantalupo nel Sannio, Macchiagodena, Roccamandolfi, San Gregorio Matese.

== Notable people ==
Raffaele Gioia, painter
