= Carpinone =

- Comune
- Comune di Carpinone
- Location within Italy Location within Molise
- Coordinates: 41°36′N 14°19′E
- Country: Italy
- Region: Molise
- Province: Province of Isernia (IS)

Area
  - Total: 32.5 km^{2} (12.5 sq mi)
- Elevation: 636 m (2,087 ft)

Population (Dec. 2004)
  - Total: 1,273
  - Density: 39.2/km^{2} (101/sq mi)
- Demonym: Carpinonesi
- Time zone: UTC+1 (CET)
  - Summer (DST): UTC+2 (CEST)
- Postal code: 86093
- Dialing code: 0865

Carpinone is a comune (municipality) in the Province of Isernia in the Italian region Molise, located about 30 kilometres (19 mi) west of Campobasso and about 7 kilometres (4 mi) east of Isernia. As of 31 December 2004, it had a population of 1,273 and an area of 32.5 square kilometres (12.5 mi^{2}).

Carpinone borders the following municipalities: Castelpetroso, Frosolone, Isernia, Macchiagodena, Pesche, Pettoranello del Molise, Santa Maria del Molise, Sessano del Molise.

== Demographic evolution ==
Historical population

Year	Pop.	±%
1861	3,109	—
1871	3,012	−3.1%
1881	3,060	+1.6%
1901	3,298	+7.8%
1911	3,306	+0.2%

Year	Pop.	±%
1921	3,020	−8.7%
1931	2,849	−5.7%
1936	2,378	−16.5%
1951	2,381	+0.1%
1961	1,843	−22.6%

Year	Pop.	±%
1971	1,311	−28.9%
1981	1,220	−6.9%
1991	1,296	+6.2%
2001	1,254	−3.2%

Source: Data from ISTAT
