= Pietrabbondante =

- Comune
- Comune di Pietrabbondante
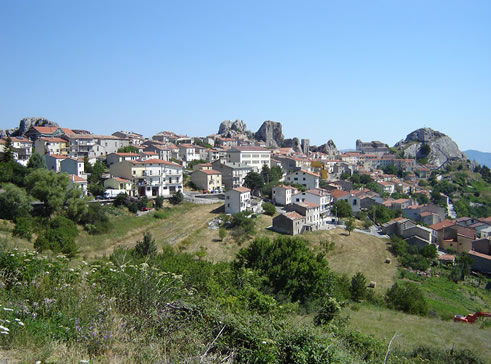
- View of Pietrabbondante

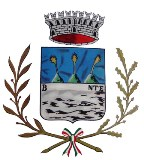
- Coat of arms

- Location within Italy Location within Molise
- Coordinates: 41°45′N 14°23′E
- Country: Italy
- Region: Molise
- Province: Isernia (IS)
- Frazioni: Arco, Macere, Ortovecchio, Ragusa-San Vincenzo, Sant'Andrea, Troilo, Vigna La Corte

Government
  - Mayor: Giovanni Tesone

Area
  - Total: 27.3 km^{2} (10.5 sq mi)
- Elevation: 1,027 m (3,369 ft)

Population (1 March 2010)
  - Total: 838
  - Density: 30.7/km^{2} (79.5/sq mi)
- Demonym: Pietrabbondantesi
- Time zone: UTC+1 (CET)
  - Summer (DST): UTC+2 (CEST)
- Postal code: 86085
- Dialing code: 0865
- Patron saint: St. Vincent Ferrer
- Saint day: August 5th
- Website: Official website

Pietrabbondante is a comune (municipality) in the Province of Isernia in the Italian region Molise, located about 30 kilometres (19 mi) northwest of Campobasso and about 20 kilometres (12 mi) northeast of Isernia.

Pietrabbondante borders the following municipalities: Agnone, Castelverrino, Chiauci, Civitanova del Sannio, Pescolanciano and Poggio Sannita.

== History ==
=== Samnites and Romans ===
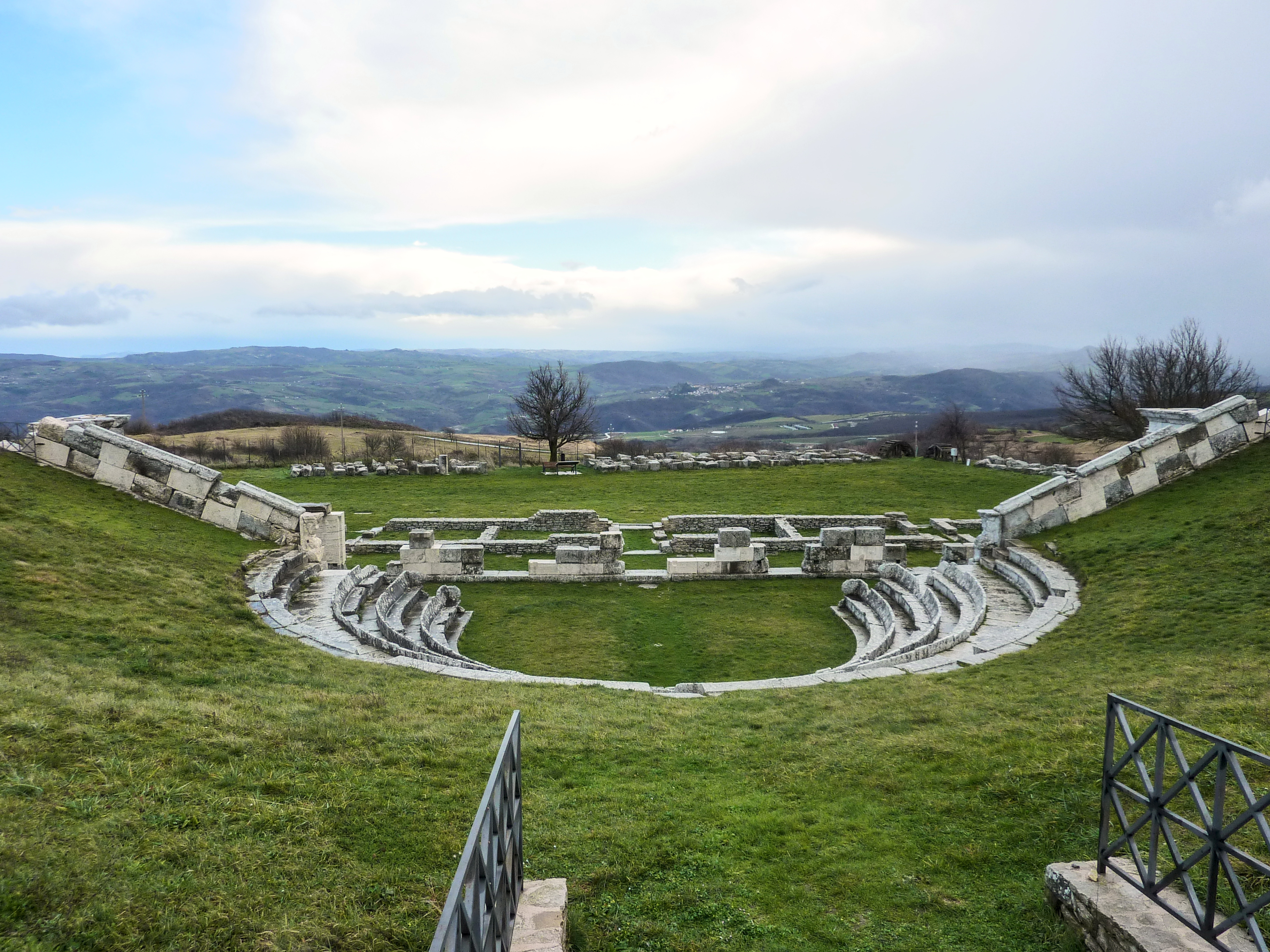
Theater of Pietrabbondante

Pietrabbondante's earliest known inhabitants were the Samnites, who arrived in Pietrabbondante in the 6th century BC. Many historians believe that it was home of the assemblies of the Samnite federal government. Although earlier scholarship thought this was the Samnite town called "Bovianum", this is now believed to be incorrect and the site is viewed as a Samnite sanctuary. The site has a single temple, a temple-theater complex, and numerous other structures. There seems to have been significant decrease in use after the loss of the Samnites and allies during the Social Wars, at the hands of Lucius Cornelius Sulla (89 BC).

Excavations in the 1840s brought to light sections of marble statues, clay tools, coins, weapons, etc. A very notable archeological find is the temple and the theater built of polygonal limestone that is a rare example of such a structure built by the Samnites.

=== Lombard ===
After the Lombards of the 8th century, it came to be designated by the name "Petra Habundante". The current name is relatively recent and is etymologically justified because the area is rich in limestone rocks and debris. In 957, the city was the capital of one of thirty-four counties in which it was divided by the Duchy of Benevento. Noble families intertwined with governing Pietrabbondante include Cantelmo, the Carafa, the Marquises, D'Andrea, and finally to D'Alessandro.

=== Present ===
Currently the town of Pietrabbondante is a tourist site. It is situated at the base of towering rocks called "Morg" Caraceni, which are located at the foot of a mountain on whose slopes have been found many megalithic remains. The town is also rich in flora, as there in places bordering large expanses of conifers and hardwoods.

== Main sights ==
=== Ancient temple and theater ===
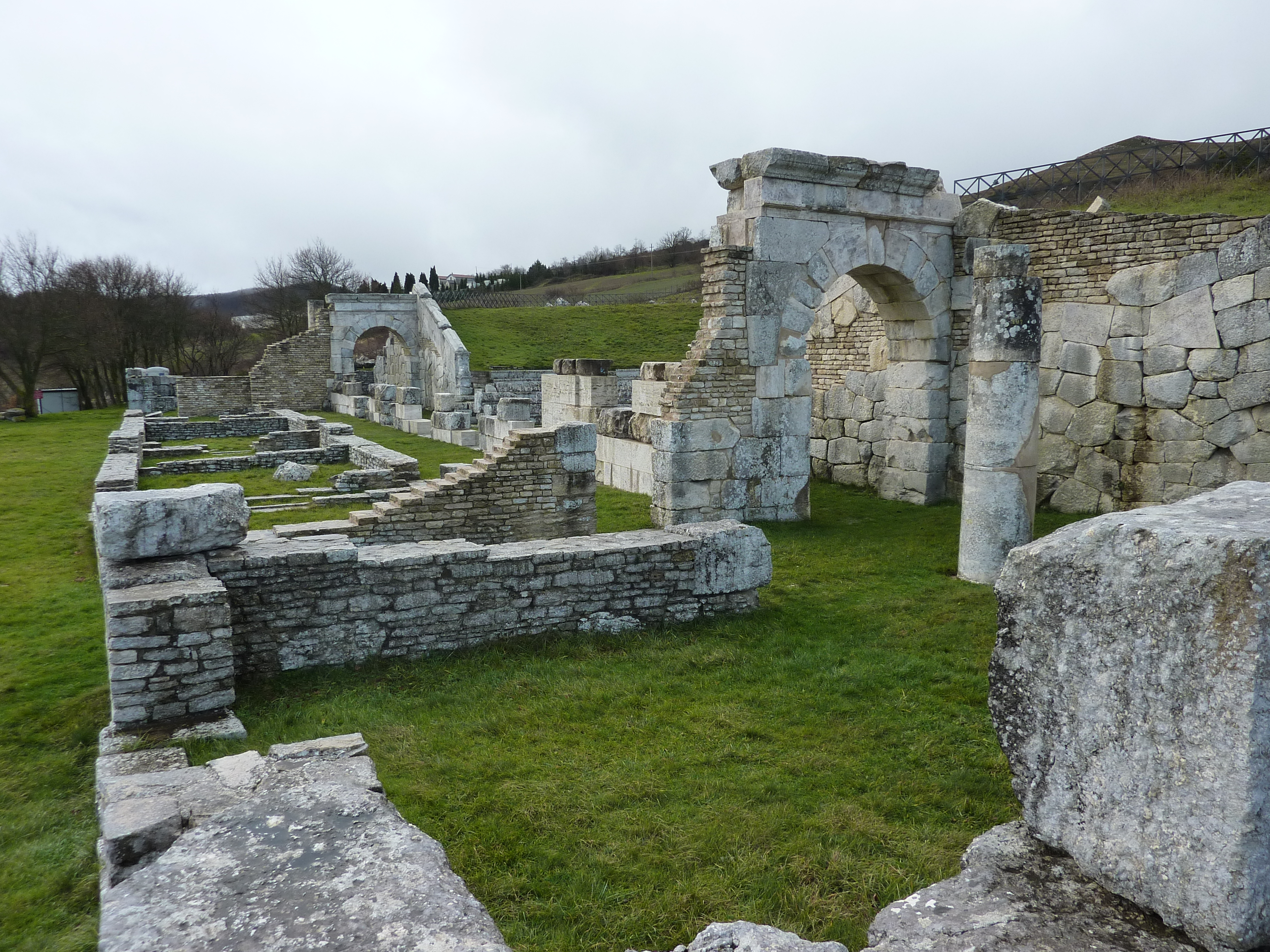
Arches of Theater Complex

On the slope of Monte Saraceno, the Samnites built a complex of worship consisting of a theater, a temple and two arcaded buildings on both sides. Work began in the late 2nd century BC and was completed in 95 AD. The building, as articulated, was intended both for worship and for institutional activities.

==== Theater ====
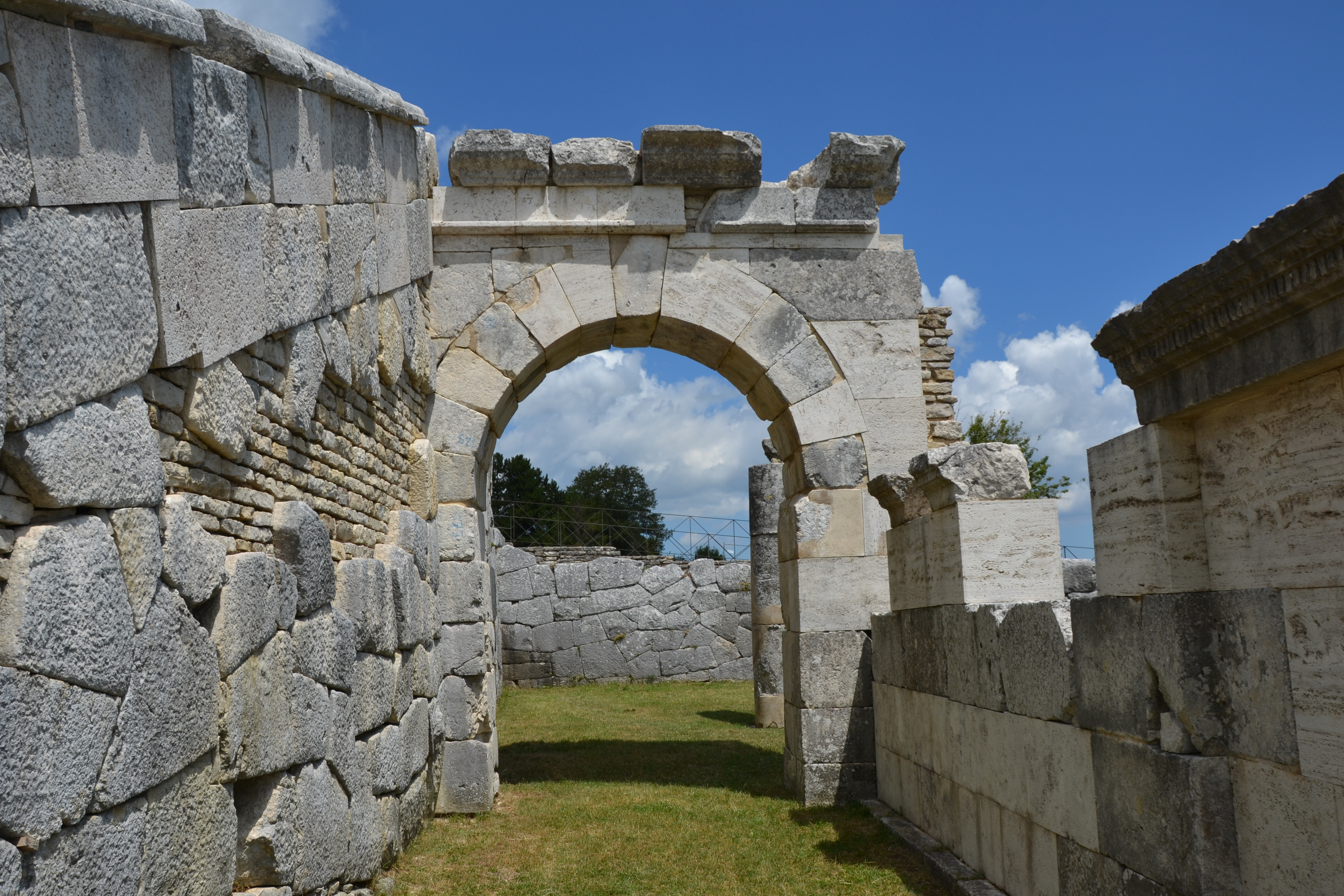
View of the polygonal masonry architecture of the Samnite theater and sanctuary complex.

The theater-temple complex is located on the outskirts of Pietrabbondante about 966 metres (3,169 ft) above sea level, next to another small temple with arcaded shops from a previous era (200 BC). To build it, the Samnites situated two terraces along the side of the mountain, but at different levels on a single axis. The top two buildings housed the temple and side porches. The overall size of the area is 55 by 90 metres (180 by 295 ft).

The theater consists of two elements: the auditorium and the building stage, which are linked together by two stone arches. The auditorium is capable of holding up to 2,500 spectators and has excellent acoustics. Each of the seats was created from a single stone block with the dorsal elegantly thrown backwards; signs at both ends of each row reserved them for judges, priests, and so on. On both sides of the orchestra, retaining walls of the embankment (analemma) end with atlases carved in stone (like the Odeon of Pompeii, however, the material is made of soft tuff). The entire embankment is supported by large semicircular and polygonal blocks processed by cutting without regular contours.

==== Temple ====
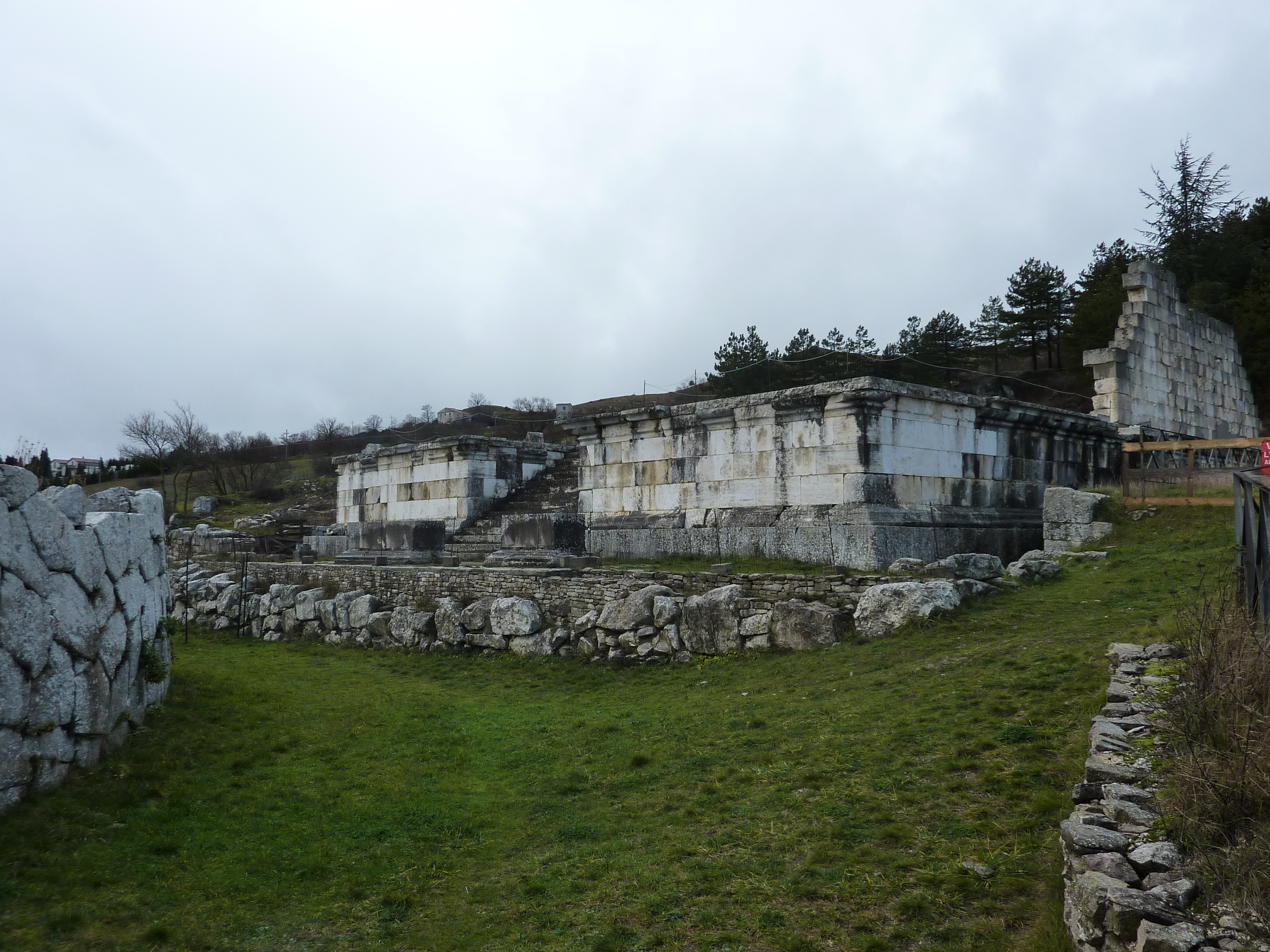
The temples of Pietrabbondante.

The theater sits on the site of an ancient (3rd century BC) Ionic temple portico, which was destroyed by Hannibal in 217 BC. The temple, measuring 22 by 35 metres (72 by 115 ft), lies behind the amphitheater. Today, the only structures remaining are the base (podium) and the eight columns that rose in front. The columns were topped with Corinthian order capitals., and had clad pottery decorated in the back with three segments paved with fine mosaics. Each of the mosaics were dedicated to different deities. The roof was built with trusses, stringers, plates and tiles, each weighing 52 kilograms (115 lb), from Venafro. Cells and columns made up its foundations, so the mighty outer wall of the podium served as a simple decorative coating. Elaborate cornices decorated with floral motifs and ram's heads topped the altars. The segments are usually darker than the original, like the steps of the dark sunken staircase. On the left side, an inscription in Oscan recalls Statius Claro, an important figure who built at his expense half of the podium. On the back of the temple, in the containment wall of the ground (north side), a phallic symbol is carved on a block for protection against misfortune. At the sides of the podium, two porches with remains of buildings used as shops and various services complement the overall harmony.

==== Discovery ====
The monument in the 2nd century AD was abandoned and completely buried by alluvium. The excavations that ultimately discovered the site were conducted in several phases: in 1857 and 1858, by the Bourbons, in 1871–72, out of interest of the Province, and in 1959 and subsequent years through the intervention of the Archaeological Superintendent of Molise.

=== Church of Santa Maria Assunta ===
The church of Pietrabbondante is dedicated to Santa Maria Assunta. During the feast of the saint, which falls on 15 August, a procession of women carry on their shoulders the saint's effigy.

The church stands on a hilltop in front of a bare rock outline called "Morgia of the Cross". The bell tower and its three belfries feature built-in stonework on top of which stands the cross; the center bell tower features a Baroque portal adorned with floral pattern, and includes a small niche in which there is a sculpture depicting Santa Maria Assunta herself. Above the portal is also a large window in the Baroque style. The perimeter wall rests on a massive support structure built with huge limestone blocks from the nearby archaeological site. The interior has undergone numerous transformations over the centuries and the present reflects a Baroque style. Subsequent to 1696, the building took the shape of a Latin cross, divided into three naves bounded by large plastered square pillars, which support the six arches. In the right aisle, a sarcophagus was found during the renovation work after the 1990 earthquake near the statues of St. Nicholas of Bari, St. Francis of Paola (1867) and St. Roch the Confessor. In the transept of the right aisle is the canvas by Angelico Zarlenga dedicated to St. Vincent Ferrer, which commemorates the destruction of housing during World War II and the return of numerous prisoners from concentration camps. At the front of the same transept there is a baptismal font made of marble.

=== War memorial ===
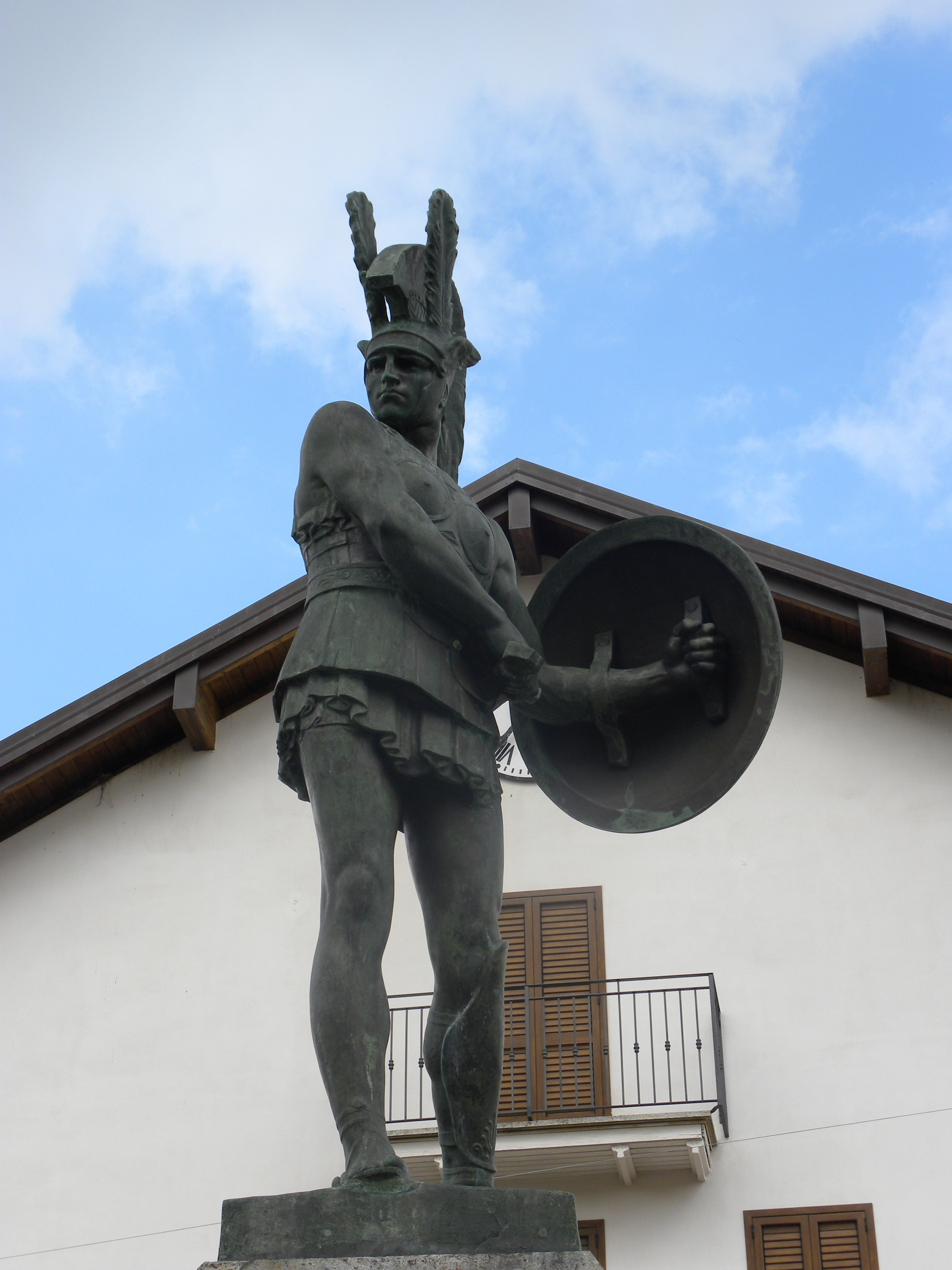
Samnite soldier statue, Pietrabbondante

A statue depicting the ancient Samnite soldier as he had represents the sacrifice of the fallen Pietrabbondantesi in World War I. An immigrant committee formed by Alessandro DiTullio in America raised money in July 1919 to remember the war victims. Subsequently, in February 1920, the Pietrabbondante City Council proceeded to erect the war memorial with these funds.
