= Castelpetroso =

- Comune
- Comune di Castelpetroso
- Location within Italy Location within Molise
- Coordinates: 41°34′N 14°21′E
- Country: Italy
- Region: Molise
- Province: Province of Isernia (IS)

Area
  - Total: 22.6 km^{2} (8.7 sq mi)

Population (Dec. 2022)
  - Total: 1,565
  - Density: 69.2/km^{2} (179/sq mi)
- Time zone: UTC+1 (CET)
  - Summer (DST): UTC+2 (CEST)
- Postal code: 86090
- Dialing code: 0865

Castelpetroso is a comune (municipality) in the Province of Isernia in the Italian region Molise, located about 25 kilometres (16 mi) west of Campobasso and about 10 kilometres (6 mi) southeast of Isernia. As of 31 December 2004, it had a population of 1,708 and an area of 22.6 square kilometres (8.7 mi^{2}).

Castelpetroso borders the following municipalities: Carpinone, Castelpizzuto, Pettoranello del Molise, Santa Maria del Molise.

== Demographic evolution ==
Historical population

Year	Pop.	±%
1861	3,011	—
1871	3,205	+6.4%
1881	3,083	−3.8%
1901	3,300	+7.0%
1911	3,360	+1.8%

Year	Pop.	±%
1921	3,320	−1.2%
1931	2,768	−16.6%
1936	2,821	+1.9%
1951	2,829	+0.3%
1961	2,471	−12.7%

Year	Pop.	±%
1971	1,944	−21.3%
1981	1,786	−8.1%
1991	1,722	−3.6%
2001	1,644	−4.5%

Source: Data from ISTAT
