= Pettoranello del Molise =

- Comune
- Comune di Pettoranello del Molise
- Location within Italy Location within Molise
- Coordinates: 41°34′N 14°17′E
- Country: Italy
- Region: Molise
- Province: Isernia (IS)

Government
  - Mayor: Andrea Nini

Area
  - Total: 15.58 km^{2} (6.02 sq mi)
- Elevation: 737 m (2,418 ft)

Population (30 September 2016)
  - Total: 452
  - Density: 29.0/km^{2} (75.1/sq mi)
- Demonym: Pettoranellesi
- Time zone: UTC+1 (CET)
  - Summer (DST): UTC+2 (CEST)
- Postal code: 86090
- Dialing code: 0865
- Website: Official website

Pettoranello del Molise is a comune (municipality) in the Province of Isernia in the Italian region Molise, located about 30 kilometres (19 mi) west of Campobasso and about 6 kilometres (4 mi) southeast of Isernia.

Pettoranello del Molise borders the following municipalities: Carpinone, Castelpetroso, Castelpizzuto, Isernia, Longano.

== Twin towns ==
- Princeton, New Jersey, United States.
