= Pesche =

Pesche L' Pèschia
- Comune
- Comune di Pesche
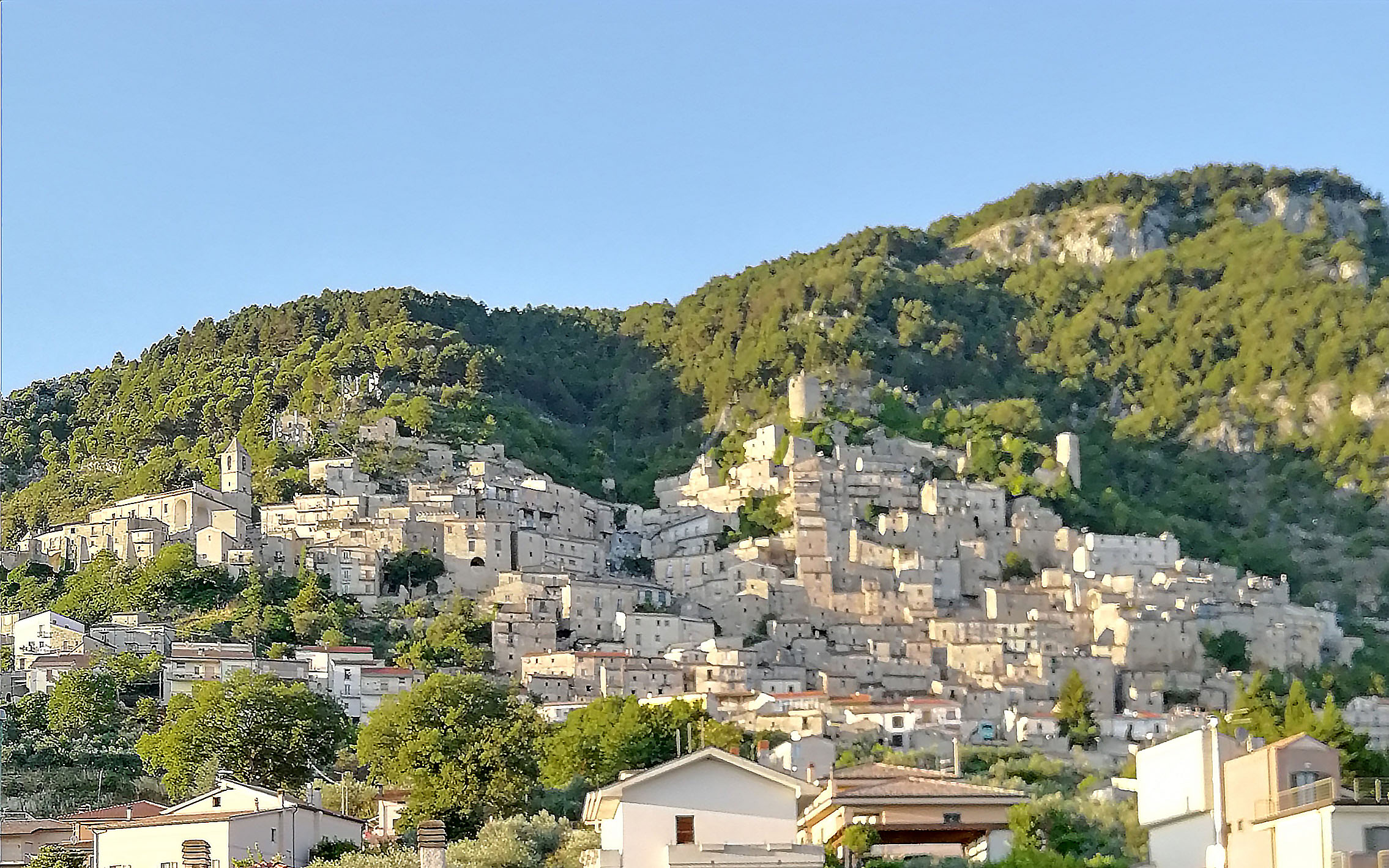
- The village of Pesche

- Location within Italy Location within Molise
- Coordinates: 41°37′N 14°17′E
- Country: Italy
- Region: Molise
- Province: Province of Isernia (IS)

Area
  - Total: 12.7 km^{2} (4.9 sq mi)

Population (Dec. 2004)
  - Total: 1,459
  - Density: 115/km^{2} (298/sq mi)
- Time zone: UTC+1 (CET)
  - Summer (DST): UTC+2 (CEST)
- Postal code: 86090
- Dialing code: 0865

Pesche is a comune (municipality) in the Province of Isernia in the Italian region Molise, located about 30 kilometres (19 mi) west of Campobasso and about 5 kilometres (3 mi) northeast of Isernia. As of 31 December 2004, it had a population of 1,459 and an area of 12.7 square kilometres (4.9 mi^{2}).

Pesche borders the following municipalities: Carpinone, Isernia, Miranda, Sessano del Molise.

== History ==
=== Classical age ===
The history of the land where Pesche was born is tied to the history of Isernia (its capital). The renaissance of the city under the rule of Nero and Trajan along with the presence of a natural hot spring, gave way to the birth to the thermal baths and the Santuario di Santa Maria del Bagno.

=== Medieval times ===
With the end of imperial authority in the western Italy and the fall of big cities, along with the arrival of new populations that governed the Italian peninsula (Eruli, Goti, Longobardi), a sudden migration away from the big cities occurred. It is exactly during this time that, close to the thermal baths, a small group of people will move to the base of Monte San Marco around the year 1000. A Benedictine monastery was already present here which was most likely built on a small Sunni fortress which was then used as a lookout post. The population grew bigger and they started settling in the town by building several important structures. The presence of the Benedictine monks is very important to the town of Pesche, as they began building places of worship and cultivated a pious lifestyle, so much so that the citizens of Pesche were known as "monastic". The most important religious structures that were built were the church of Sant'Angelo, the Santa Maria dell'ospedale (where they also managed a hospice) and the convent of Santa Croce. The church of Sant'Angelo (the parochial church at the time) was not built inside the walls of the city but further up on the hills. During this time the center and the houses of its inhabitants were also being built further up the valley and outside of the city walls. The political situation was also changing and Pesche became an important possession of the Monastery of Montecassino, so much so that at the time it also had papal protection.

=== Modern times ===
In 1956 a violent earthquake destroyed the majority of the town, forcing the monks who stayed to return to Montecassino. During that time there was also a plague, perhaps a contagious flu, that delayed the speed of reconstruction. In 1593 a church was built that was dedicated to San Benedetto and Santa Scolastica, on which the church that stands there today was erected as the latter was also severely damaged due to another earthquake in the 18th century.

=== The 1900s ===
During WWI the citizens of Pesche also went out to fight, and a statue in their honor was built in April 1920, the first in all of Molise. During that time the biggest influence on the town was religion and the church led by the Archpriest don Zeffirino Petrecca, who fought to maintain things as they were during his time and kept to the origins and traditions of the town.

In the 1950s several trees were planted in the hills, which today make up the Pine forest, which functions as a fortress for the unstable stones around the town that are sedimentary and are on a clayish terrain. From the ’80s there is an expansion of the town in the lower part, where people have started to live, abandoning the historical center.

== Monuments ==
=== Parochial Church of Madonna del Rosario ===
The Parochial church which still stands today was built on top of the ruins of previous religious ruins dating back to the 15th century and brought to its modern form by the Archpriest Silvestro Biondi between 1727 and 1759. The renovations of the church cost 4,645 ducats and 864 for the church bells. From 1758 to 1761 the outdoor steps to the church were built. In 1760 the central nave which, is 22 meters long, 8 wide and 12 high.

== Demographic evolution ==
Historical population

Year	Pop.	±%
1861	1,561	—
1871	1,531	−1.9%
1881	1,482	−3.2%
1901	1,315	−11.3%
1911	1,043	−20.7%

Year	Pop.	±%
1921	1,069	+2.5%
1931	947	−11.4%
1936	914	−3.5%
1951	860	−5.9%
1961	635	−26.2%

Year	Pop.	±%
1971	547	−13.9%
1981	583	+6.6%
1991	958	+64.3%
2001	1,312	+37.0%

Source: Data from ISTAT

== Sister city ==
Woodstock, Ontario, Canada
