= Coinage of the Social War (91–88 BC) =

Coinage of the Social War

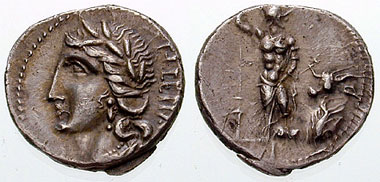
Denarius
Laureate head of Italia left, Oscan retrograde legend right UILETIV [víteliú = Italia]	Helmeted soldier standing front, head right, holding inverted spear, right foot on (Roman?) standard; left foot on uncertain object; recumbent bull to his right, Oscan "A" in exergue.
AR, 3,60 g

The family of Social War coinage includes all the coins issued by the Italic allies of the Marsic confederation, Marsi, Peligni, Piceni, Vestini, Samnites, Frentani, Marrucini, and Lucani, during the Social War (91–88 BC) against Rome.

Inspired by the Roman denarius, their circulation (and perhaps their release) continued even after the conflict ended, contemporary and promiscuously with their republican models.

== Issues ==
=== Types ===
Coins issued during the Social War consist chiefly of silver coins of the weight of the contemporary Roman denarius, and they are thought to have been issued from the mints of Corfinium and Aesernia.

This coinage belongs to the crucial years of the revolt against Rome (90–89 BC). Similar coins of the same family may have been struck later, although there is no firm evidence of this. They circulated in parallel and openly with the Roman denarii of the same weight,. Furthermore, some isolated exempla come from stratigraphic contexts much more recent than the insurrection against Rome.

==== Examples of silver denarius ====
One coin that circulated during the Social Wars was a silver denarius coin that on the front side depicted Bacchus with a wreath and on the back depicted the Italian bull goring the Roman wolf. There is an inscription in Oscan on both sides.

Another example of a silver denarius personifies Italia on one side, and on the other shows eight warriors swearing an oath.

==== The unique gold stater ====
There is also in the Paris Collection a well-preserved single gold stater of Attic weight of 8.47 gr. (a picture of this coin can be seen here. A drawing is in ) and its first appearance dates back to 1827, although Julius Friedländer reported 1830:

- Obverse: head of young Dionysos right, crowned with ivy wreath.
- Reverse: Cista mystica adorned with three wreaths and with a wolf (or panther) skin on the top; thyrsos with ribbons; in exergue, Oscan retrograde legend mi.ieíis.mi, (a certain and otherwise unknown Minatius Jegius, Minatii f. (?)).

The authenticity of this coin is disputed. The genuineness of the piece was supported by Julius Friedländer in his fundamental work about Oscan coinage with an argument based on the perfect accuracy of the legend when compared with the poor knowledge of the Oscan alphabet and language at the time the coin first appeared before the pioneering works of Klenze (1839), Mommsen (1845) and Lepsius (1841). The coin, in particular, shows a perfect distinction between i and stressed í (the difference, in Oscan script, is the addiction of a little line), a distinction that none were aware of before the work of Klenze.

Arguments against the coin's authenticity come from Secondina Lorenza Cesano and Alberto Campana, who very closely follows Cesano reasoning.

=== Iconography ===
Some of the iconographic themes were original, while others were borrowed from the Roman coinage.

When borrowed, the themes acquired new meanings or resonances. For example, the heads on the obverse was usually a personification of Italia depicted as a goddess with a helmet, which replaced the head of Rome, accompanied by a legend reproducing his name, ITALIA, in the Latin alphabet or VITELIU (víteliú = Italia) in Oscan alphabet (there is a unique copy, actually in the de Blacas collection, known to report the double LVITELLIU [vítelliú]).

=== Inscriptions ===
The inscriptions were partly in Oscan and partly in Latin characters. The pieces were struck by a central mint with two different and simultaneous issues, one for the Oscan-speaking and one for the Latin-speaking citizens.

Legends often record the names of the chief leaders of the Revolt: Quintus Poppaedius Silo, Gaius Papius Mutilus, with his title Imperator, an unknown Numerius Lucius (?), and others.

== See also ==
- Roman Republican currency
- Ancient Greek coinage
- History of coins in Italy
- Coinage of Aesernia

== Sources ==
- (in Italian) Alberto Campana, La monetazione degli insorti italici durante la Guerra Sociale (91–87 a.C.), Apparuti edizioni, Soliera, 1987
- (in Italian) Secondina Lorenza Cesano, Di Uranio Antonino e di altre falsificazioni (About Uranius Antoninus and other falsifications), in Rivista Italiana di Numismatica e Scienze Affini, pp. 35–69
- (in German) Julius Friedländer, Die oskischen Münzen, Lipsia, 1850
- (in French) Theodor Mommsen, Louis de Blacas, Histoire de la monnaie romaine, Paris, 1865–1875
- This article incorporates text from:
  - Barclay Vincent Head (1844–1914), Historia Numorum, a Manual of Greek Numismatics, Oxford: 1887; 2° ed. London, 1911, pp. 29–30 (online version from snible.org) a publication now in the public domain
- (in Latin) Karl Richard Lepsius, Inscriptiones Umbricae et Oscae quotquot adhuc repertae sunt omnes, Leipzig, 1841
