= Amedeo Maiuri =

Italian archaeologist (1886–1963)

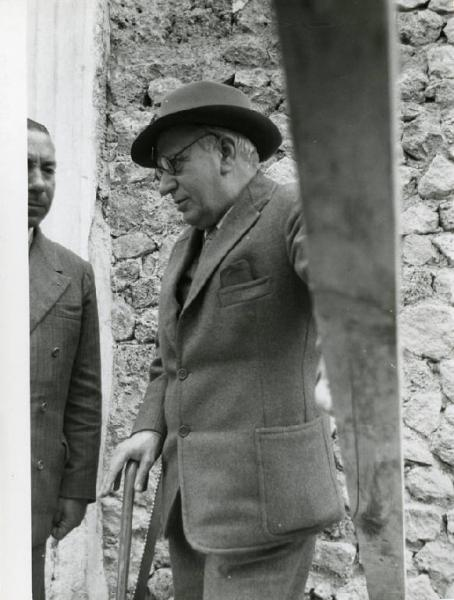
Amedeo Maiuri in Pompeii, 1952

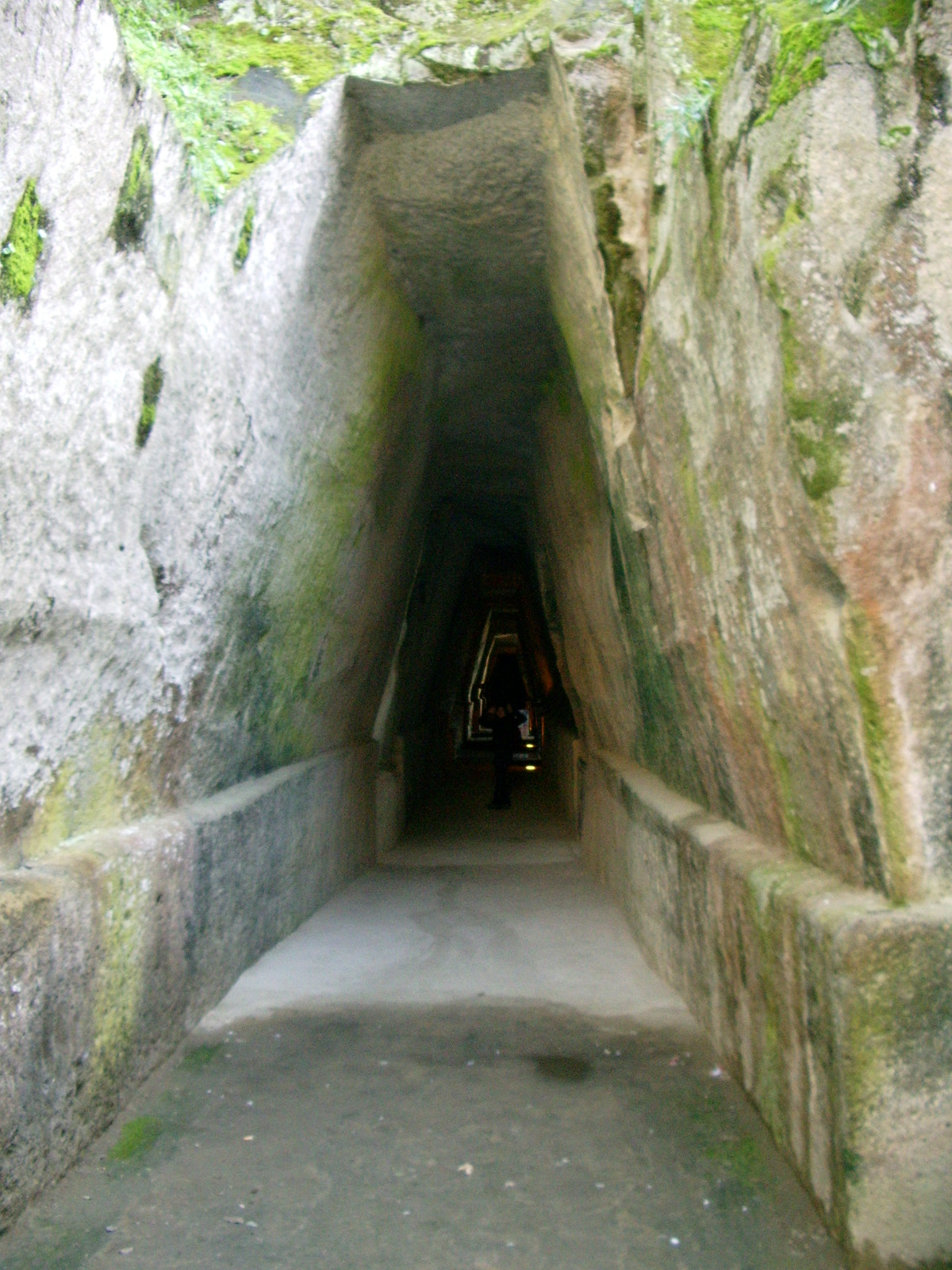
Entrance to the Cave of the Cumaean Sybil rediscovered by Maiuri in 1932.

Amedeo Maiuri (January 7, 1886 – April 7, 1963) was an Italian archaeologist, famous for his archaeological investigations of the Roman city of Pompeii which was destroyed in the eruption of Mount Vesuvius in August of AD 79. He was the first to conduct systematic scientific excavations, analysis and publication at Pompeii and other sites around Vesuvius.

Born at Veroli, Italy, from 1914 until 1924 the young Maiuri directed the Italian archaeological mission in Greece, with a focus on Rhodes and the construction of a new museum there.

In 1924, Maiuri was installed as the chief archaeologist of Pompeii, serving as director until 1961. Maiuri's work at Pompeii was revolutionary and he exposed many remains, and proposed chronologies, that are still at the focus of scholarly discussion. Maiuri's work included, for the first time, excavations below the Roman destruction level of 79 AD when he chose to excavate one of the most famous houses of Pompeii, the House of the Surgeon to investigate the earlier history of the city.

Maiuri excavated other cities destroyed by the eruption of Vesuvius, such as Herculaneum.

He discovered the Cave of the Cumaean Sibyl in May 1932. The Cave is a trapezoidal dromos or passage over 131 meters long running parallel to the side of the hill and cut out of the volcanic stone. In 1936 he became first president of the Italian Numismatic Institute after it was transformed from a private to a public association.

The few remains of the Tiberian villa Damecuta are the result of excavations done between 1937–48 by Maiuri (who also excavated Villa Jovis), on land donated to the Italian Government by Axel Munthe, celebrated author of The Story of San Michele.

His book, L'anfiteatro flavio puteolano (1955), is considered to be the definitive monograph on the subject of the Flavian Amphitheatre in Pozzuoli.

The model of the torch used in the 1960 Summer Olympics in Rome was inspired by Professor Maiuri from torches reproduced on ancient monuments.

Maiuri died in Naples in 1963.

== Bibliography ==
- Maiuri, Amedeo. L'anfiteatro flavio puteolano. Napoli : G. Macchiaroli, 1955.OCLC 79380459
- A. Maiuri, “Pompei. Sterro dei cumuli e isolamento della cinta murale. Contributo all’urbanistica della città dissepolta.” In Bollettino d’Arte 45 (1960): 172, L. García y García Danni di guerra a Pompei, 167.
