= Santi Cosma e Damiano, Isernia =

Catholic Church in Molise, Italy

Santi Cosma e Damiano
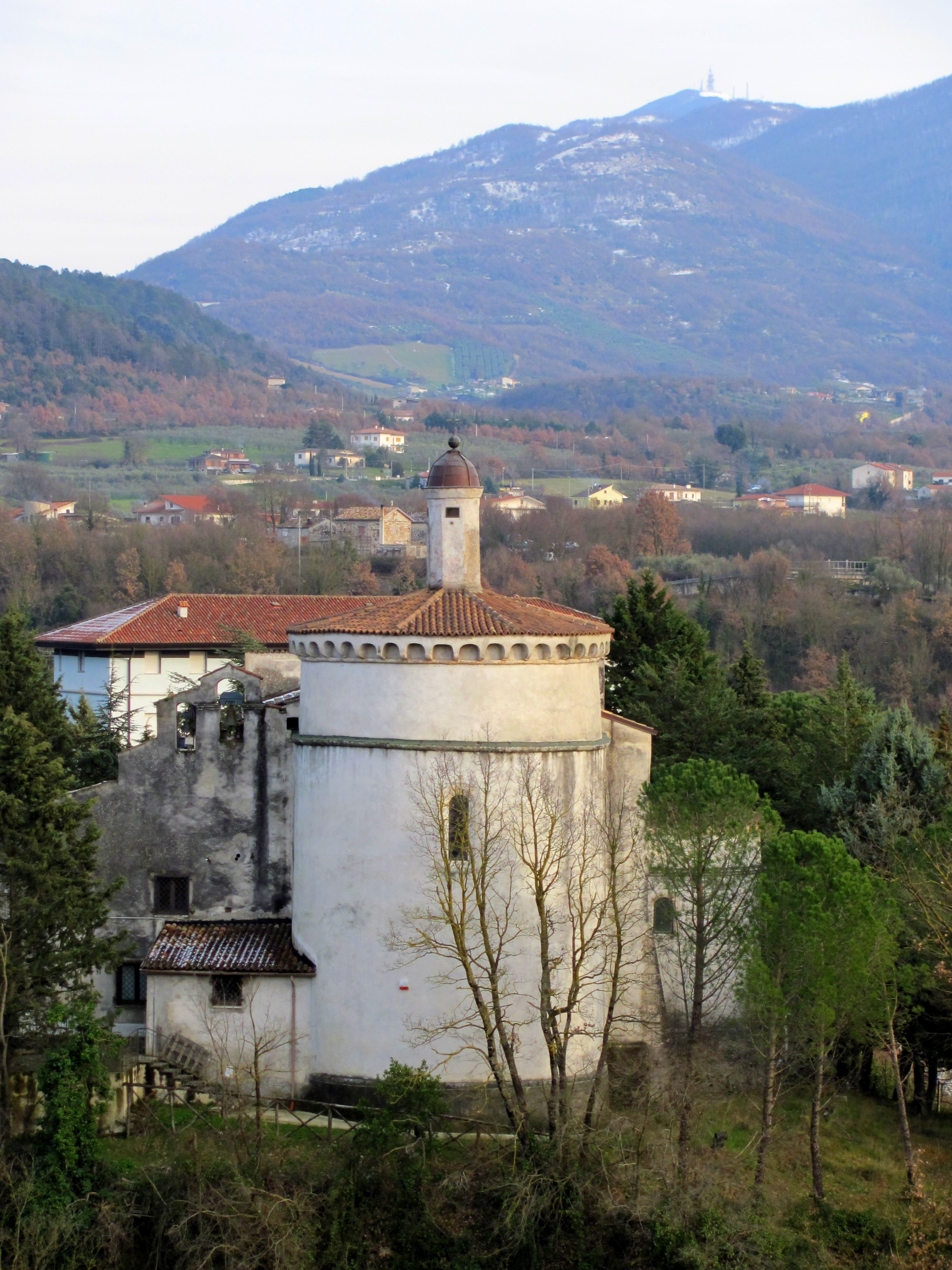

- Location within Molise Location within Italy

Religion
- Affiliation: Roman Catholic
- Region: Molise
- Rite: Latin Rite

Location
- Location: Isernia, Molise
- Interactive map of Santi Cosma e Damiano
- Coordinates: 41.5841°N 14.2256°E

Architecture
- Type: Church

Santi Cosma e Damiano is a Roman Catholic church in the town of Isernia in the region of Molise, Italy.

== History ==
A chapel at the hilltop at this site was founded circa 1130, and by the 14th century, a new church was erected dedicated to the Saints Cosmas and Damian (Italian: Santi Cosma e Damiano). The main altar was built in 1639 and houses a 16th-century canvas depicting the Madonna and Child with Saints and Cardinal Numaio. While bishop of the town, the Cardinal Numaio placed the church and its property under the property of the diocese.

The altar of the Virgin of the Addolorata (1744) is to the right of the nave. The altar of the Crucifixion on the left dates to 1645.
