= Italian Numismatic Institute =

Coordinates: 41°54′13″N 12°29′25″E

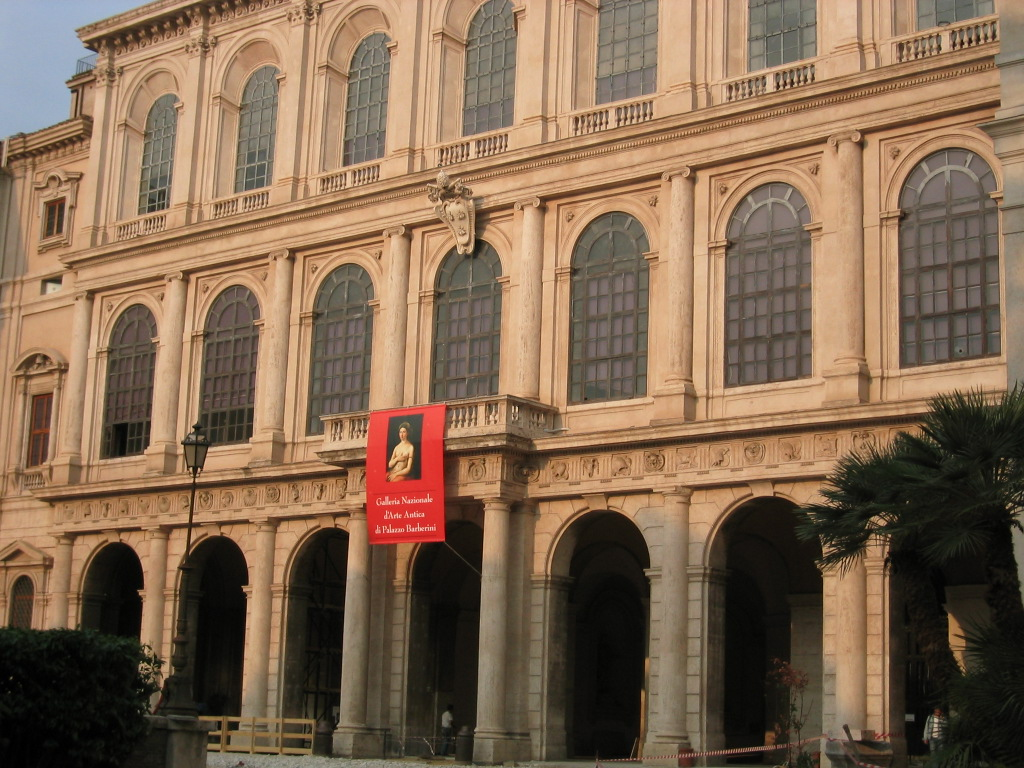
The Palazzo Barberini houses the Italian Numismatic Institute and the Galleria di Arte Antica

The Italian Numismatic Institute (Istituto italiano di numismatica) is an Italian body for the study of numismatics, based in Palazzo Barberini at 13 via Quattro Fontane.

== History ==
It was founded in Rome in 1912 as a private association by a group of Italian numismatists, including Secondina Lorenza Cesano, an academic at Rome University. Initially a voluntary association under private law, it acquired public law judicial status under the royal decree (RDL) number 223 of 3 February 1936. It thus joined the Italian Numismatic Society, which was founded in the 19th century.

The duties assigned to the Institute by its founding legislation encompass the promotion and direct execution of scholarly research within the field of numismatics, in addition to incentivizing and implementing related activities within its area of competence. Within this mandated framework, the Institute conducts various research projects, frequently undertaking these in cooperation with other academic or research institutions. It disseminates the results of these inquiries through multiple publication channels, including dedicated monographic works, general miscellanies, and its own official periodical, the Annali. Furthermore, the Institute undertakes the organization of international conferences focused on specific themes pertinent to its research agenda, subsequently publishing the resulting proceedings for academic record. To ensure the effective execution of its institutional duties, the Institute maintains collaborative relationships with Italian archaeological superintendencies and museums, various university departments, and both Italian and foreign research bodies.

== Partnership and membership ==
In terms of international scholarly cooperation, the Institute contributes to the field by providing the American Numismatic Society with the detailed cataloging of all relevant material published in Italy concerning numismatic subjects. These records are subsequently integrated into the semi-annual periodical, The Numismatic Literature, which is published in New York. It is a founder member of the Centro Internazionale di Studi Numismatici, based in Naples, created in 1965 as a result of a joint initiative by the International Numismatic Council and the Museo Civico Filangieri, a private museum in Naples. The Institute holds formal membership in several key international bodies, including the International Numismatic Council, the Unione Internazionale degli Istituti di Archeologia, Storia e Storia dell’Arte in Rome, and the American Numismatic Society.

The Institute maintains a specialised library containing comprehensive works and journals relevant to numismatics across all historical periods. Additionally, a photothèque (photographic archive) of medals is available, which is consultable via a dedicated database linked to the Institute's website.

== Governance ==
It is governed by a 'Consiglio direttivo' or directorial committee, made up "of presidents of the four national historical Institutes, the president of the National Institute for Archaeology and Art History, and two experts nominated by decree by the Ministry of Cultural Heritage and Activities". Since 2011 the president of the 'consiglio' has been Sara Sorda, whose predecessor Attilio Stazio died in 2010. Its current members are Andrea Giardina, Adriano La Regina, Luigi Lotti, Massimo Miglio, Nicola Parise, Sara Sorda and Romano Ugolini. Past members of the 'Consiglio' include Edoardo Martinori, once its vice-president.

=== Presidents ===
Since 1936 its presidents have been:

- Amedeo Maiuri (from 1936).
- Cesare Maria De Vecchi, conte di Val Cismon (from 1939).
- Secondina Lorenza Cesano (acting president, from 1943).
- Gaetano De Sanctis (extraordinary commissar, from 1944).
- Francesco Pellati (governing commisar, from 1952).
- Aldo Ferrabino (governing commisar, from 1958).
- Laura Breglia (1962–1991).
- Attilio Stazio (from 1991)
- Sara Sorda (from 2010)

== Publications, library, and multimedia resources ==
- The institution's official journal, Atti e Memorie, operated in a position of mild competition with the Rivista Italiana di Numismatica, which was published by the pre-existing Italian Numismatic Society. A fundamental divergence between the two journals was evident in their editorial scope: the institute's publication was more specifically focused on classical coinage, dedicating particular attention to the Greek and Roman periods. Conversely, it consistently showed less interest in medieval and modern numismatics—those fields were more extensively covered by its primary competitor;
- A significant development occurred in 1954 when the journal Annali dell'Istituto Italiano di Numismatica was founded under the direction of Laura Breglia. Following the established editorial direction of its predecessor, this new publication also concentrated primarily on ancient numismatics. It further documented and reported on the activities of the coin collections (Medaglieri) housed within [List of museums in Italy|Italian museums] and regional superintendencies. Through this specialised focus, the Annali served as a crucial, complementary periodical to the existing publication produced by the Italian Numismatic Society.

== Conferences ==
Since 1961 it has organised:

- 1961: VI Congresso Internazionale di Numismatica
- 1978: «Le forme e i modi della scambio e le espressioni del valore nel Mediterraneo Orientale, tra la tarda età del Bronzo e gli inizi della monetazione»
- 1982: «Stato e moneta a Roma fra la tarda repubblica e il primo impero»
- 1983: «Aspetti della società romana fra la metà del IV e la metà del III secolo a.C.: documentazioni a confronto»
- 1986: «La moneta nei contesti archeologici: esempi dagli scavi di Roma»
- 1988: «L'inflazione nel IV secolo d.C.»
- 1995: «Bernhard Laum. Origine della moneta e teoria del sacrificio»
- 1997: «Metodi statistici e analisi quantitative della produzione di monete nel mondo antico. Tendenze e prospettive di ricerca»
- 1997: «La storia mutilata: la dispersione dei rinvenimenti monetali in Italia»
- 2000: «La moneta in ambiente rurale nell'Italia tardomedievale»
- 2001: «Per una storia del denaro nel Vicino Oriente antico»
- 2004: «Dal Denarius al Dinar: l'Oriente e la moneta romana»
- 2004: «Weights in Context. Bronze Age Weighing of Eastern Mediterranean: Chronology, Typology, Material and Archaeological Contexts»
- 2008: «Quantifying Monetary Supplies in Greco-Roman Times»

== Bibliography (in Italian) ==
- Giovanni Gorini, Cento anni della Rivista italiana di numismatica, in Rivista italiana di numismatica, XC, 1988
- Istituto Italiano di Numismatica (official site)
- Annuario n. 49 dell'Unione Internazionale degli Istituti di Archeologia Storia e Storia dell'Arte in Roma, pp. 327–330
