= Coinage of Aesernia =

Coinage of the ancient city of Aesernia

Vulcan bronze - chariot
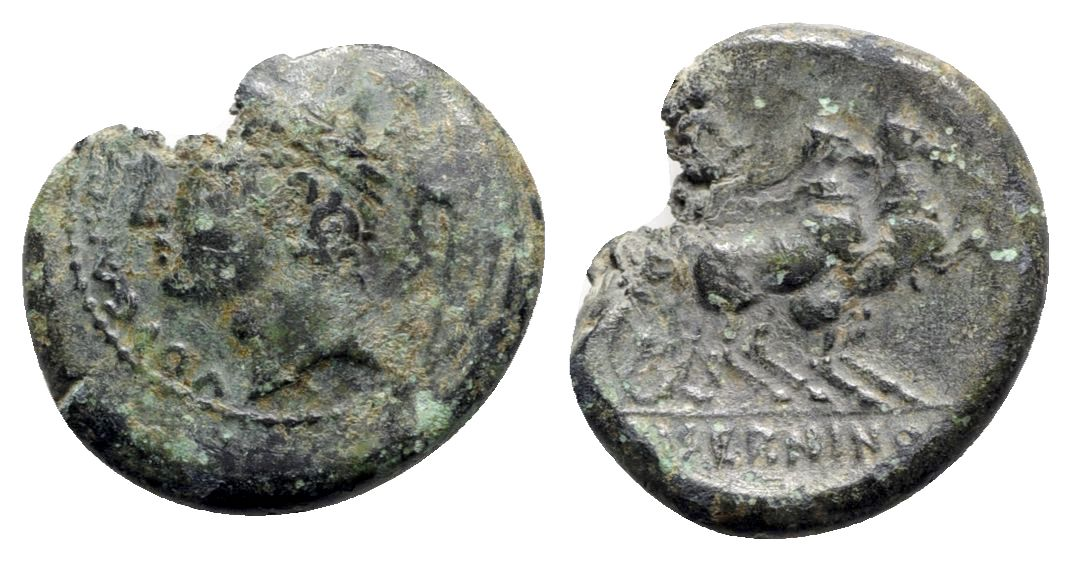
First side of the image: VOLCANOM head of Vulcan with pileus; behind pincers.
Second side of the image: Jupiter driving a chariot, above Victory. In exergue [A]ISΕRΝΙΝΟ
Æ 21,5mm 5,96 g.
Minerva bronze - eagle
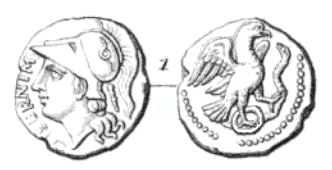
First side of the image: AISERNIO Minerva with Corinthian helmet, club behind.
Second side of the image: Eagle grasping a snake.
Æ, Garrucci, 1848 Value 3000€

Coinage of Aesernia concerns coins minted in Aesernia, a city in Samnium (modern Isernia), where a Roman colony was created in 263 BC. The coins were minted around 263 to 240 B.C., after the colony was founded.

Colonies under Latin law constituted state entities, with local magistrates, administrative autonomy and, in some cases, the right to mint coinage.

The city was (and is) located in the upper valley of the Volturno, a river that provided a route for contacts and trade with northern Campania.

Some authors believe that some of the coinage of the Social War may have been minted in the same center.

== Cataloging ==
No specific text has been published for the coinage of Aesernia.

The most extensive treatment can be found in Arthur Sambon's book titled Les monnaies antiques de l'Italie, published in Paris in 1903. Contrary to what the title suggests, the book deals only with part of ancient Italy, practically central Italy and Campania. The coins pertinent to Aesernia are numbered from 175 to 189. Thus in the catalogs one can find a Sambon type reference followed by the number.

A less thorough, but still sufficiently valid, analysis can be found in Historia Nummorum Italy, published in Britain in 2001 by a group of numismatists coordinated by Keith N. Rutter. This text distinguishes only the main types. In the catalogs one can find a type reference HN or HN Italy followed by the number:

- 429 for the coin with the head of Minerva,
- 430 for that with the head of Vulcan,
- 431 for the one with Apollo and the bull.

Other cataloging sources are the Sylloge Nummorum Graecorum. Generally the most recent or most widely used are used, such as that of the American Numismatic Society, Copenhagen, and France. For bronzes, the Sylloge of the Morcom Collection, a collection of bronzes from the Greek West, based in Britain, is also used. An abbreviated Sylloge indication, such as ANS, Cop., France or Morcom followed by the number of the coin depicted, can be found in catalogs.

== Historical context ==
Like all other cities in central southern Italy, it was under Samnite rule since the 5th century BC. The first certain news about the city came in the year 295 B.C., during the Samnite wars, when it had already fallen into the hands of the Romans.

The city's location immediately proved to be strategically very important for Rome's expansionist aims, forming the gateway to Samnium. After the first victories, the Romans positioned their colonies at strategic points along the borders with the Samnite territories; one of these colonies was established precisely at Aesernia in 264 BC.

The city is mentioned again in 209 BC as one of eighteen colonies that remained loyal to Rome during the most difficult period of the Second Punic War.

== Monetary context ==
Dislocation of centers

In the period between the First and Second Punic Wars, new coins with similar characteristics appeared in a group of cities linked to Rome.

These are bronze coins presenting two types, similar in style to Roman coins of the same period: the first presents on the obverse the head of Apollo turned to the left and on the reverse a bull with a human face, to the right and with its head to the front, identical to that of the coinage of Neapoli of the same period; the second features on the obverse the head of Minerva with a Corinthian helmet and on the reverse a standing rooster.

Some of these cities exclusively minted coins with Apollo, others only those with Minerva, and others both.

In addition to the types mentioned, some of the cities also minted staters of Campanian foot and also other bronze coins with different types.

The cities are all located in Latium adjectum, Campania, and the Volturno basin.

| Mint | Apollo | Minerva | Stater | Other bronze |
|---|---|---|---|---|
| Aesernia | × (S. 175-182) | | | × (S. 183 / 184-189) (Note: Two types: Minerva / Eagle with snake in claws and Vulcan / Jupiter on chariot.) |
| Aquinum | | × (S. 166-170) | | |
| Caiatia | | × (S. 974-976) | | |
| Cales | × (S. 919-967) | × (S. 916-918) | × (S. 885-915) (Note: Athena / Victory on chariot. There is also a rare drachma commonly attributed to Cales.) | |
| Compulteria | × (S. 1066-73) (Note: Ethnic in Oscan alphabet, often retrograde.) | | | |
| Suessa | × (S. 877-884) | × (S. 873) | × (S. 852-869) (Note: Apollo / Naked rider on horse leading a second horse.) | × (S. 870-872) (Note: Head of Mercury / Hercules choking the lion.) |
| Teanum Sidicinum | × (S. 989-1002) | × (S. 1004) (Note: Unlike the city's other coins, this one bears the ethnic in the Latin alphabet: TIANO.) | × (S. 977-988) (Note: Hercules / Victory on triga.) | × (S. 1003) (Note: Mercury / Bull with human face.) |
| Telesia | | × (S. 174) | | |
Cataloging according to Sambon, 1903, in parentheses

Cities share not only types but also coins and some identifying marks, such as the recurring acronym ΙΣ. The symbols used to distinguish individual issues also tend to overlap, at least for cities with a more conspicuous number of issues. The symbols used also largely overlap with those of the coins of Neapolis and Rome.

These coincidences, the simultaneous presence of coins from these cities, in the treasures that have come down to us, alongside those from Neapolis and Rome, stylistic congruities and more, have led scholars to speculate on some form of common circulation and the existence of a common authority to control coinage.

== Coins ==
The known coins of Aesernia are all bronze and feature three types:

1. Apollo / bull with human face
2. Minerva / eagle
3. Vulcan / Jupiter.

The first type is in common with those issued by centers in northern Campania during the same period. The type with Vulcan and that with Minerva, on the other hand, are specific to this community. In each case they are fiat money, that is, coins whose value is not determined by their metal content.

These coins are present, as well as in others, in the treasure found at Pietrabbondante (Bovianum Vetus) and described by Gabrici. The find is listed as IGCH (Inventory of Greek Coin Hoards) 1986, Noe 816, and Crawford RRCH 24.

In the second half of last November a hoard of coins, found in the province of Campobasso, on the site of ancient Bovianum Vetus, now Pietrabbondante, was sold to the National Museum in Naples. The hoard contains seventeen pieces of aes grave and two hundred and fifty-six bronze coins, from various cities of Campania and especially from Neapolis. So great, in my opinion, is the importance of this repository, that I deem it necessary to make an extended report, touching those points of the monetary and political history of Campania, which receive light from it.

— Ettore Gabrici

In the list of coins there are 13 bronzes from Aesernia and bronzes from some of the cities already mentioned: Rome, Aquinum, Cales, Neapolis, Nola, Sessa, Teanum Sidicinum.

The find is important because some coins from Neapolis are struck on coins from Cales and coins from Aesernia.

The lowest date of the concealment of this hoard is given us by the coins of Aesernia, which cannot be earlier than 263 B.C., the year of the deductio of a Latin colony in that city.

— Ettore Gabrici

=== Minerva ===
This group is cataloged as HN Italy 429 or as Sambon 183.

The coins present on the obverse the head of the goddess Minerva turned to the left, wearing a Corinthian helmet, decorated with a serpent. Behind the goddess is depicted a club and in front is the ethnic, in this case AISERNIO. The reverse depicts an eagle grasping a snake with its talons.

The type of Minerva's head is similar to that of the Cales stater. The type of the eagle fighting with a snake is also found in the fourth-century BCE coinage of Hipponium.

Sambon has no variants of this type; he identifies only differences in the style of letters used for the ethnic.

=== Vulcan ===
Bronze: Vulcan / Jupiter
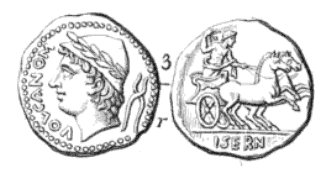
First side of the image: Vulcan with laureate pileus.
Second side of the image: Jupiter in a chariot.
Æ, Garrucci, 1848

The head of Vulcan is appropriate in a country where earthquakes are of frequent occurrence, supposing that the connexion between seismic and volcanic phenomena was recognized in the third century B.C.

— Barclay Vincent Head, Historia Numorum

This type features on the obverse the head of the god Vulcan wearing a pileus encircled with a crown. Depicted behind are pincers, the symbol of the god, and in front is the legend VOLCANOM with the Latin alphabet.

The type with Vulcan's head wearing the laureate pileus is found in a sextant and trient from Populonia (HN Italy 188 and 195). The type with Vulcan is also present in that of Ariminum, but in this case the pileus has no crown. Coins with the image of Hephaestus are, however, present in the production of many Greek mints, including that of Lipara, today's Lipari.

Bronze: Vulcan / Jupiter
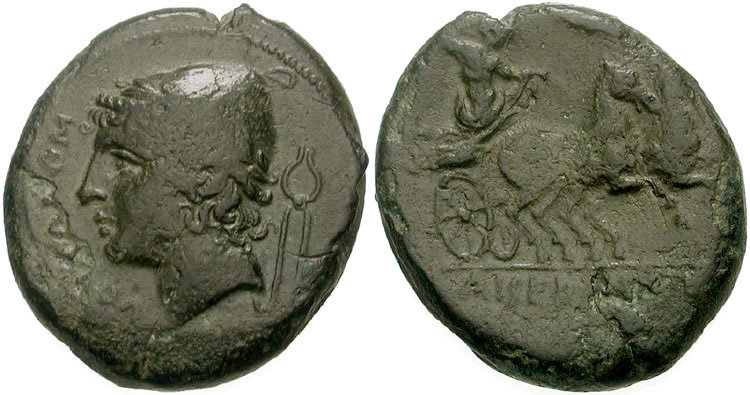
First side of the image: Vulcan with laureate pileus.
Second side of the image: Jupiter in a chariot.
Æ 20mm; 6,90 g

=== Apollo ===
This group is cataloged as HN Italy 431. Sambon identifies several variants cataloged from 175 to 182.

The group features the head of Apollo on the obverse, encircled by a laurel wreath. Behind the head is a symbol: pentagram or oval shield. Ahead is the legend AISERNINO.

The reverse depicts a bull with a human head. This creature represents the god Achelous or more generally a river deity. In the coins of Aesernia, as indeed in those of Neapolis and other communities, a Nike in flight crowns the bull. Under the bull are sometimes found letters: Τ,Ν, ΙΣ. In the exergue sometimes the ethnic: AISERNINOM with several variants.

Coins from Neapolis show the same type, with Apollo on the obverse and the bull on the reverse. The type of the androprosopus bull is widespread in coinage of the area such as those of Cales, Suessa, Teanum Sidicinum, or Cubulteria. All these coins of the Apollo/bull type are influenced by those of Neapolis.

The letters ΙΣ, already seen, are also present in the other coins of the area (Compulteria, Cales, Neapolis, etc.) and are seen as indicative of close cooperation in the production of the issues. Some coins from Neapolis, dated ca. 255 B.C., which show the same types, are found to be recognized over Aesernia coins of the Vulcan/Jupiter type.

Sambon distinguishes the eight variants based on the letters between the legs of the bull and the spelling of the ethnic.

== Findings ==
Thompson et al. report four treasure finds.

| IGCH | Place | Finding date | Burial date (BC) | Quantity of Aesernia coins | Other coins |
|---|---|---|---|---|---|
| 1986 | Pietrabbondante | 1899 | 265-60 | 13 Æ | 17 aes grave and 162 Æ Roman-Campanian and Campanian |
| 1995 | Morino | 1830 ca. | 240-30 | "many" Æ | "many" Æ Roman-Campanian and Campanian |
| 2005 | Italy | 1862 | 230 ca. | 2 | Æ "some" Roman-Campanian and "many" Campanian |
| 2035 | Castagneto (Teramo) | 1912 | 3rd century BC | 3 | Neapolis, Teanum, Rome |

== Legends and epigraphy ==
The letter "L" as seen in the coins of Aesernia.

The legends are of two types: VOLCANOM and the ethnic written in various ways: AISERNINOM, AISERNIM, AISERNIO, and AISERNINO.

For the ethnic, the alphabet used is Latin. Differences from modern spelling can be detected in the shape of the following letters:

The letter "A" as seen in the coins of Aesernia.

The letter “L” in VOLCANOM has an archaic shape similar to the shape of the corresponding Etruscan letter, with the horizontal stroke facing up.

The letter “A” in AISERNINO has an archaic form with the horizontal stroke slanting downward.

The letter “O” sometimes occurs open at the bottom.

The letter "S" as seen in the coins of Aesernia.

The letter “S” in some coins is written as shown.

== Weights and alloys ==
The only alloy used is bronze, and the value of the coins is not related to their metal content; consequently, variability is relatively high. Rutter et al. report the minimum and maximum weights in grams of the various types:

| Type | minimum | maximum |
|---|---|---|
| Minerva | 6,5 | 8,3 |
| Vulcan | 4,5 | 8,5 |
| Apollo | 4,4 | 6,5 |

== See also ==
- Economy of Ancient Greece
- Roman currency
- Isernia
- Coinage of Luceria

== Bibliography ==
- Catalli, Fiorenzo (1995). Monete dell'Italia antica [Coins of ancient Italy] (in Italian). IPZS. ISBN 88-240-3977-4.
- Gabrici, Ettore (1900). "Pietrabbondante - Ripostiglio di monete di bronzo antiche della Campania, proveniente dal territorio di Bovianum Vetus" [Pietrabbondante - Repository of ancient bronze coins of Campania, from the territory of Bovianum Vetus]. Notizie degli Scavi di antichità [News of the Excavations of Antiquities] (in Italian). Serie V.
- Vincent Head, Barclay (1911). Historia Numorum: a Manual of Greek Numismatics (2nd ed.). London: Oxford.
- Panvini Rosati, Franco (2000). "Monetazione preromana in Italia" [Pre-Roman coinage in Italy]. In Panvini Rosati, Franco (ed.). La moneta greca e romana [Greek and Roman coinage] (in Italian). Rome: "L'Erma" di Bretschneider.
- N. Rutter, Keith (1997). Greek coinages of Southern Italy and Sicily. London: Spink. ISBN 0-907605-82-6.
- N. Rutter, Keith; et al. (et al.) (2001). Historia Nummorum - Italy. London: British Museum Press. ISBN 0-7141-1801-X.
- Sambon, Arthur (1966) [1903]. Les Monnaies antiques d'Italie [Ancient coins from Italy] (in French). Paris: Forni. ISBN 978-88-271-0107-0.
- Thompson, Margaret; Mørkholm, Otto; M. Kraay, Colin, eds. (1973). An Inventory of Greek Coin Hoards (IGCH). New York: ANS. ISBN 978-0-89722-068-2.
- E. Fisher, Joan, ed. (1969). SNG American Numismatic Society, Part 1: Etruria-Calabria. New York: American Numismatic Society.
- Schwabacher, Willy; Breitenstin, Niels, eds. (1981). SNG Copenhagen, Vol. One: Italy, Sicily. Copenhagen: Danish National Museum.
- Parente, Anna Rita, ed. (2003). SNG France, Vol. 6, Part 1: Italie (Étrurie-Calabre) [SNG France, Vol. 6, Part 1: Italy (Etruria-Calabria)] (in French). Paris: Bibliothèque Nationale de France / Numismatica Ars Classica. ISBN 2-7177-2232-7.
