= Santa Chiara, Isernia =

Church in Isernia, Italy

Santa Chiara
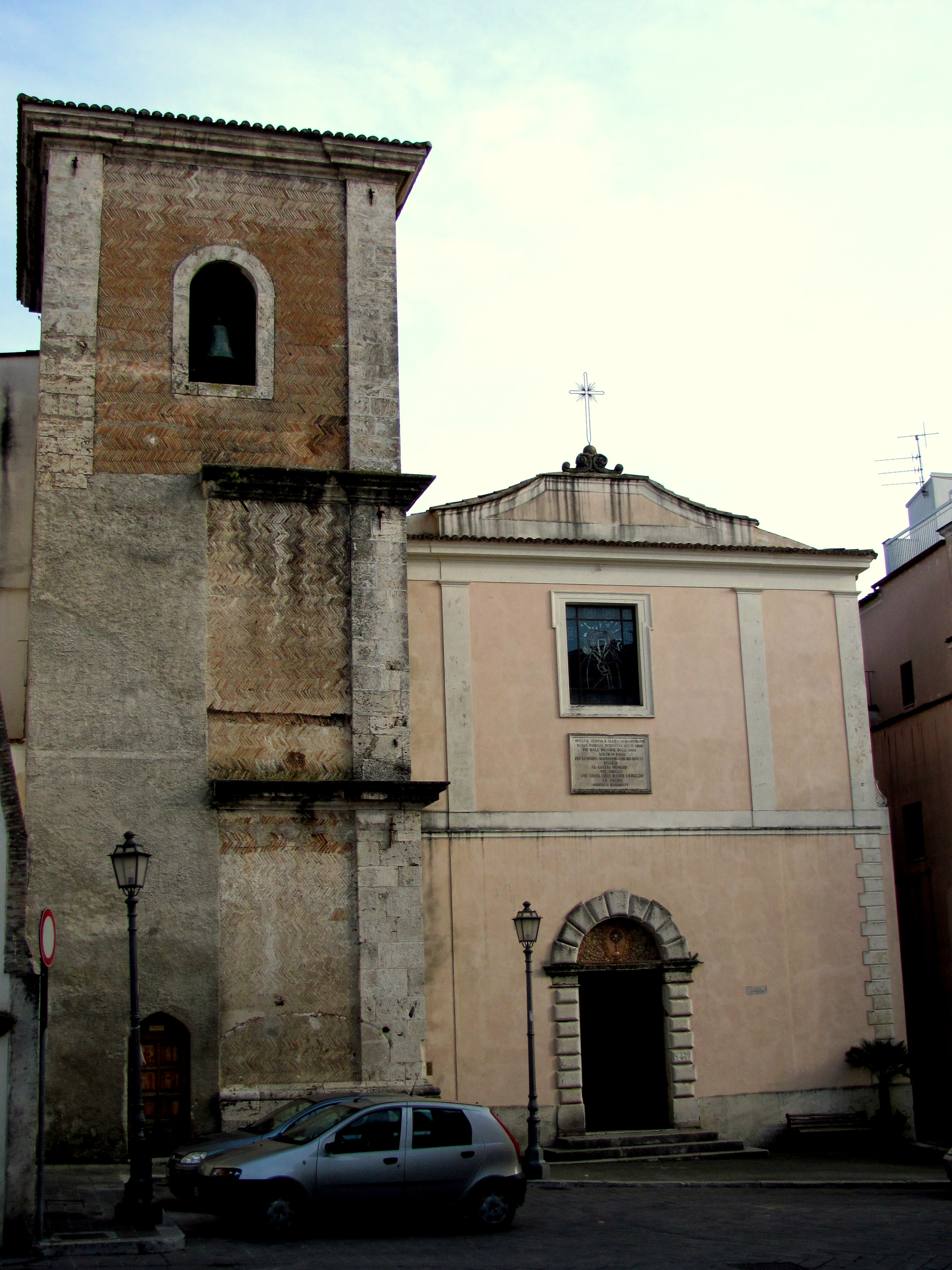
- Facade and Bell-tower

- Location within Molise Location within Italy

Religion
- Affiliation: Roman Catholic, now deconsecrated
- Region: Molise

Location
- Location: Isernia Molise
- Interactive map of Santa Chiara
- Coordinates: 41.5907°N 14.2275°E

Architecture
- Type: Church

Santa Chiara is a deconsecrated Roman Catholic church located on Corso Garibaldi #55 in the town of Isernia in the region of Molise, Italy.

== History ==
The historian G. Vincenzo Ciarlanti assigned the founding of a church at this site to circa 1275 commissioned by an Alferio di Isernia. Adjacent to the church was the convent of Santa Maria Annunziata di Agnone, housing Poor Clares since 1422–1434, who had been previously housed in the Monastery della Maiella. The monastery was suppressed in 1809. At the end of the 19th-century, an earthquake forced the closure of the church until 1910. During the first world war, prisoners of the Austria-Hungary were housed in the convent.

The church still contains wooden altars, one from the 16th century. The main altarpiece depicts the Virgin between St Francis and St Clare. The altar on the left has a canvas depicting the Virgin surrounded by Apostles. The church was once adjacent to a home for female orphans, founded in 1896 and with care provided by Servite nuns.
