= Coinage of Luceria =

Ancient Roman coinage of Luceria

Coinage of Luceria concerns the coins issued in Luceria, a city in Daunia (today's Lucera), after the Romans established a colony.

The city minted coins in the period between about 275 B.C. and the Second Punic War.

Roman coins were later minted in the city in two periods: 214-212 BC and in 211-208 BC.

Luceria's coins are part of the set of those issued by colonies and allies of Rome in ancient Apulia; after the Second Punic War Luceria, like most centers in now Roman Italy, no longer minted its own coins and adopted Roman coinage, centered on the denarius.

Traditionally numismatists treat the coins of Luceria as part of Greek coinage. Roman coins minted in Luceria, however, are considered Roman coins.

== Numismatics ==
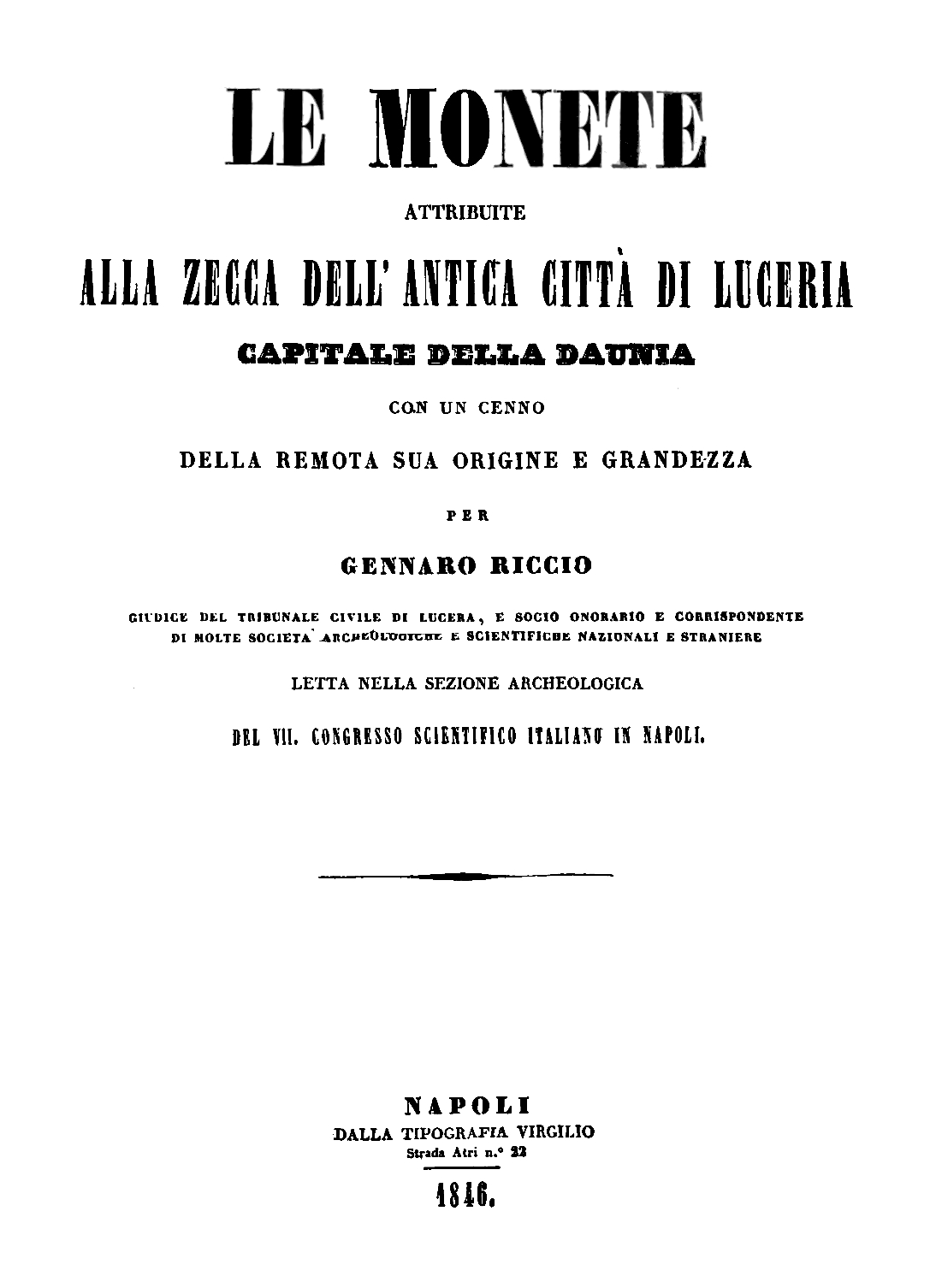
The title page of Gennaro Riccio's work.

There are some specific works on the coins of Luceria. The first is a text written in 1846 under the title Le monete attribuite alla zecca dell'antica città di Luceria, whose author is Gennaro Riccio, a scholar of the time who published several other works including Le monete delle antiche famiglie di Roma, on the coins of the Roman Republic.

Another monograph was presented in 1906 in Corolla numismatica, a series of numismatic essays dedicated to Barclay Vincent Head. The author was Herbert Appold Grueber, author of several numismatic essays.

In 1993, at a conference held in Lucera, entitled Ancient Lucera: the Pre-Roman and Roman Ages, Aldo Siciliano reported on “The Coinage of Luceria.” However, his talk is not in the Proceedings of the Historical Studies Conference, published by Crsec in 2001.

== Cataloging ==
Although several works deal with the subject, these are not used to catalog coins.

For cast coins, texts specific to this coin type are used: Ernst Haeberlin: Aes Grave (1910, with 1967 reprint) and Vecchi: Italian Cast Coinage (2013). The coins pertaining to Luceria in the latter text are numbered 272 to 288.

For hammered bronzes the references are the text Historia numorum Italy, written by a group of authors coordinated by Keith N. Rutter, and various Sylloge Nummorum Graecorum. The various Sylloge and Historia numorum Italy are also used to catalog cast coins. The coins in Historia Numorum Italy pertaining to this mint are numbered 668 to 684.

Texts on Roman Republican coinage (Sydenham and Crawford) are used for coins minted by the Romans at Luceria. In Crawford's text the two groups of Roman coins minted at Luceria are catalogued in series 43 the former (pp. 153–154) and series 97 to 99 the latter (pp. 183–190).

== Historical context ==
Luceria played a role of strategic importance in Daunia. It came under Roman control in 321 BC and in 314 became a Latin colony.

The coinage falls largely in the years following the establishment of the colony.

== Monetary context ==
The coinage of Luceria is placed in the last quarter of the 3rd century BC. It consists of cast bronze coins, with several series, and coins struck in one series.

Also attributed to the mint of Luceria are some Roman coins minted during the Second Punic War.

Autonomous coins have a pound subdivided into base 10 instead of base 12. This subdivision is characteristic of a group of communities all located on the Adriatic coast. In addition to Luceria, some communities in Umbria (Ariminum), the Vestini, Picenum (Hatria) and Apulia (Venosa) have this subdivision. The decimal subdivision was also used by Capua during the Second Punic War.

In this case the fractions take different names than those used in the Tyrrhenian coast, where the libra is divided into 12 ounces. We speak in this case of biunx, terunx, quadrunx, and quincunx, that is, from the value of 2, 3, 4, or 5 uncias. However, the reference uncia differs between communities: ca. 379 g in Ariminum, Hatria, or by ca. 341 g in Apulia.

== Coinage ==
=== Cast coinage - first period ===
As
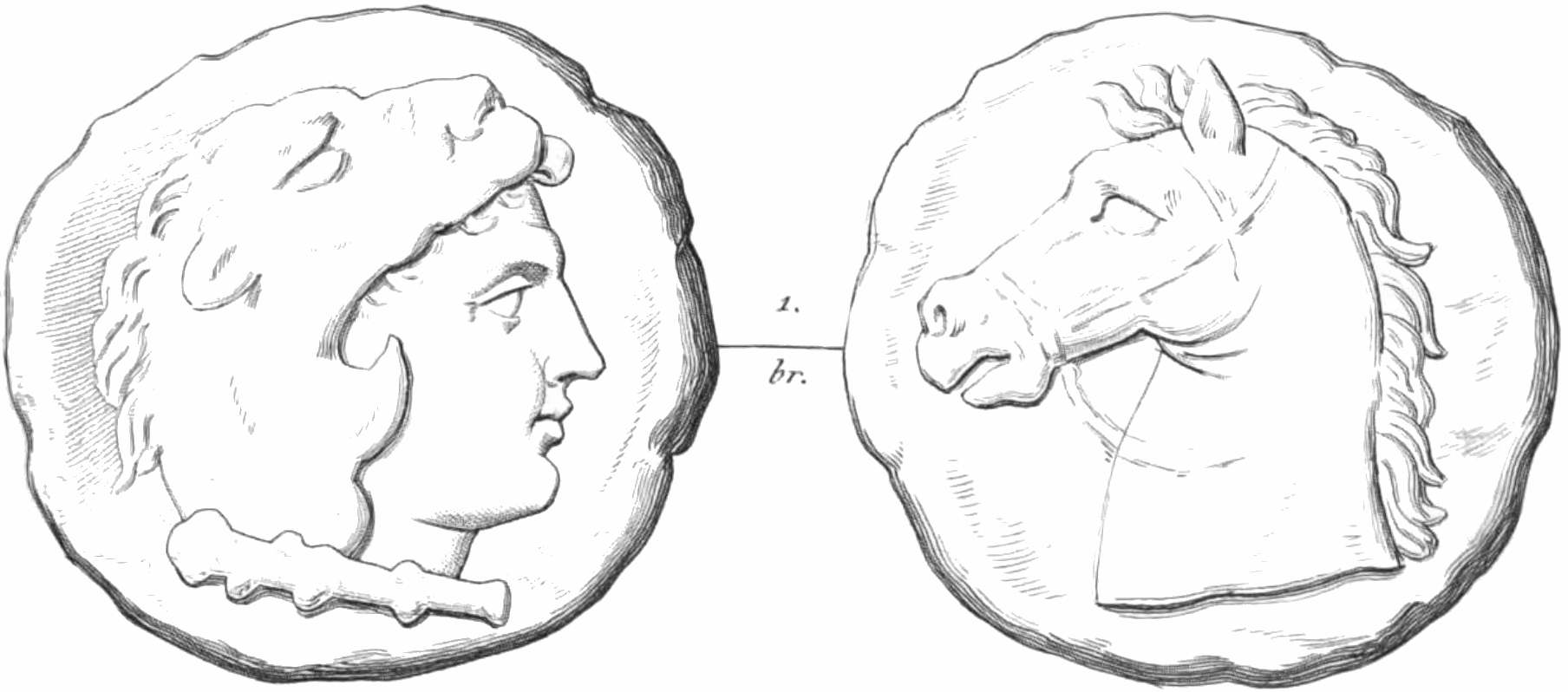
First side of the image: Head of Hercules facing right wearing a lion's head. Below a club.
Second side of the image: Equine protome turned to the left.
Aes grave, 361 to 341 g.

To this early period are ascribed some coins whose attribution to the mint of Luceria however is not certain. These are some cast coins placed around 280 BC. - 275 BC. Some of these coins are mentioned in an essay on the aes grave published in the Rivista italiana di numismatica in 1891.

The first coin (HN Italy, 668; Vecchi 333) is a cast as with an average weight of 327 g. The obverse depicts the laureate head of Apollo turned to the right and on the reverse a galloping horse with a large 16-ray star above it. The coin sometimes bears on the obverse the legend C.MODIO CR.F. L. PVLIO L.F.. The galloping Apollo-horse type is found in a coeval Roman-Campanian stater and in a Roman bronze dated ca. 235 BC.

A second coin reported in Historia Numorum Italy (HN Italy, 669) is an as bearing Apollo's head on the obverse and sometimes, on the left the value indication (I). A rooster is depicted on the reverse. The value mark is often present. Some specimens bear the legend L. SEXTI SEP. BABI, others M. LAVINIO, and still others bear no name.

A third coin has on the obverse the head of Hercules turned to the right and on the reverse an equine protome (Thurlow-Vecchi 272). The reasons for attributing this coin to Luceria are not made explicit. This coin is also considered to belong to this mint by Riccio and Grueber.

The names could indicate either duumviri of Luceria or mint officials.

=== Cast coinage - second period ===
Triens
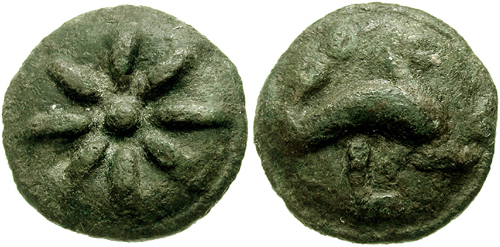
Triens Aes Grave (circa 220 BC)

A series of cast coins from the quincunx to the semuncia is placed, by Rutter and others, in the years 225-217 B.C., between the beginning of the conquest of Cisalpine Gaul and the Battle of Lake Trasimene, which Vecchi also places in the period 225-217.

The as is divided into 10 ounces. The theoretical weight of the as, based on the quincunx would be ca. 224 g, while calculated on the semuncia the weight would be ca. 433 g.

The coins in this series are all illustrated, in his text, by Riccio. Many types are repeated in a series of aes grave issued later with reduced weights.

Aes grave, second period
Image	Value	Obverse	Reverse	Weight (Rutter et al.)	Cataloging
	quincunx	Four wheel spokes.	Four wheel spokes; five pies.	90-125 g	Riccio, cl. I, 3; HN Italy 670, Haeberlin p. 183; Thurlow - Vecchi 274
	quadrunx	Lightning.	Club, four pies.	90-137 g	Riccio, cl. I, 4; HN Italy 671, Haeberlin p. 183; Thurlow - Vecchi 275
	terunx	Six-ray star.	Dolphin swimming to the left; below three pies.	63-118 g	Riccio, cl. I, 5; HN Italy 672, Haeberlin p. 183-4; Thurlow - Vecchi 276
	biunx	Scallop shell.	Astragalus, two pies.	64-80 g	Riccio, cl. I, 6; HN Italy 673, Haeberlin p. 184; Thurlow - Vecchi 277
	uncia	Frog.	Ear of grain, a pie.	26-51 g	Riccio, cl. I, 7; HN Italy 674, Haeberlin p. 184-5; Thurlow - Vecchi 278
	semuncia	Crescent.	Thyrsus.	13-32 g	Riccio, cl. I, 4; HN Italy 671, Haeberlin p. 185-6; Thurlow - Vecchi 275

=== Cast coinage - third period ===
As
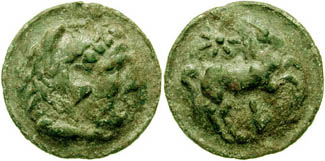
Æ Aes Grave. 65,62 g, HN Italy 676

There is a third group of coins, with values in this case ranging from the unit (as or nummus) to the semuncia. The types are basically the same as in the previous series with the addition of the unit, which is not present in the other series. The issue is placed, by Rutter and others, in the years 217-212 B.C., that is, between the Battle of Lake Trasimene and the conquest of Syracuse by Marcus Claudius Marcellus; Vecchi also places it in the period around 217-212 B.C., that is, just before the beginning of the Second Punic War.

The series is based on an as weighing about 79 g. The differences lie not only in the reduced weight and the as, but also in the presence on the reverse of the mint mark, absent in the earlier series, by means of the ancient Latin L or more rarely, the most recent L.

Riccio associates with this group a Roman semis, catalogued as Cr. 43a and dated by Crawford 214-212 BC.

The terunx of this series differs from that of the preceding series not only in metrological aspects but also in that the star presents eight rays instead of six.

Aes grave, third period
Image	Value	Obverse	Reverse	Weight (Rutter et al.)	Cataloging
	as	Head of Hercules turned left.	Horse raised right; top star, below.	56-92 g	Riccio, cl. II, 1; HN Italy 676, Haeberlin p. 187; Thurlow - Vecchi 280

=== Hammered coinage ===
The third cast coinage was followed by an early hammered coinage, characterized by the presence of the ethnic oVCERI in the reverse of all coins. The types feature the head of a deity on the obverse, and on the reverse they repeat themes taken from those of earlier coinage. Since it is not a cast series, it is not present in Thurlow - Vecchi nor in Haeberlin. Two different types are present for the semuncia.

Rutter et al. date these coins in the period 211 - 200 BCE, thus at the same time as the date of the first issue of the denarius (211 BCE).

Coniazione al martello, emissione autonoma
Image	Value	Obverse	Reverse	Weight (Rutter et al.)	Cataloging
	quincunx	Head of Minerva with Corinthian helmet; above five pies.	Eight-spoke wheel; between the spokes oVCERI.	12-18 g	Riccio, cl. III, 1; HN Italy 678
	quadrunx	Head of Hercules; behind four pies.	Quiver, club and bow; in the middle oVCERI.	11-14 g	Riccio, cl. III, 2; HN Italy 679
	terunx	Laureate head of Neptune; behind three pies.	Dolphin to the right; top trident, bottom oVCERI.	8-11 g	Riccio, cl. III, 3; HN Italy 680
	biunx	Head of Ceres veiled and laureate; behind two pies.	Scallop shell; below oVCERI.	6-7 g	Riccio, cl. III, 4; HN Italy 681
	uncia	Laureate head of Apollo; on shoulder bow and quiver; on left a pie.	Frog; around oVCERI.	2-5 g	Riccio, cl. III, 5; HN Italy 682
	semuncia	Juridical heads of the Dioscuri, wearing the pileus.	Horses of the Dioscuri; above oVCERI.	ca. 2 g	Riccio, cl. III, 6; HN Italy 684
	semuncia	Head of Diana turned to the right. She has a crescent as a diadem.	Crescent; above oVCERI.	ca. 2 g	Riccio, cl. III, 7; HN Italy 683

=== Roman coinage - first period ===
This series consists of Roman coins minted by a mint located in Luceria. The coins are distinguished from other Roman coinage by the presence of the letter.

The series consists of values that descend from the as down to the half-as.

The dating of this series, according to Crawford, is in the period 214-212 BC, during the Second Punic War.

The series features the characteristic types of Roman Republican bronze coinage with the ship's prow present on the reverse of all values.

The axis is a cast coin. The semis has two variants: the first is cast and the other is struck. Haeberlin lists for the axis 9 specimens and for the cast semis 22. The latter coin was included by Riccio among those of Class II.

The coin series is cataloged as Crawford 43. The individual values are then catalogued as 43/1, 43/2 etc.

The as on which the series is based has a standard weight of about 83 grams, calculated on 45 specimens from the as to the trient.

Image	Value	Obverse	Reverse	Cataloging	Note
	as	Laureate head of Janus.	Bow turned to the right; above I; ahead.	Cr. 43/1	cast coin
	semis (cast)	Laureate head of Saturn.	Bow turned to the right; above S (sometimes); ahead.	Cr. 43/2a	cast coin
	semis	Laureate head of Saturn; below S.	Bow turned right; above S; ahead, below ROMA.	Cr. 43/2b	hammered coin
	trient	Helmeted head of Minerva, with Corinthian helmet; behind; above four pies.	Bow turned right; above ROMA; below four pies.	Cr. 43/3a	Variants 3b and 3b show the on the obverse in front of the head and on the reverse respectively.
	sextans	Head of Mercury facing right; above two pies.	Bow turned right; above ROMA; below two pies separate from the letter.	Cr. 43/4	
	uncia	Helmeted head of Rome facing right, with Corinthian helmet.	Bow turned right; above ROMA; below a pie and the letter.	Cr. 43/5	
	semuncia	Head of Mercury with petasos.	Bow turned right; above ROMA; below.	Cr. 43/6	

Identification with this center is given by the presence of the, an archaic form of the letter L.

=== Roman coinage - second period ===
Quinarius
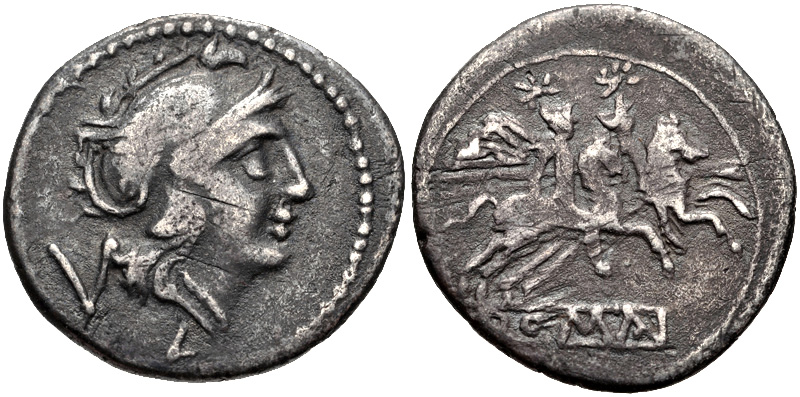
First side of the image: Helmeted head of Rome; behind V (value sign); below.
Second side of the image: Dioscuri on horseback facing right. In exergue ROMA in inset.
Quincunx
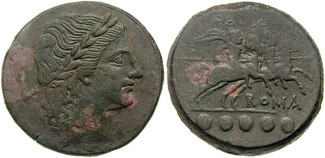
First side of the image: Laureate head of Apollo; back.
Second side of the image: Dioscuri on horseback toward right, ROMA below; ••••• in exergue.
Dextans
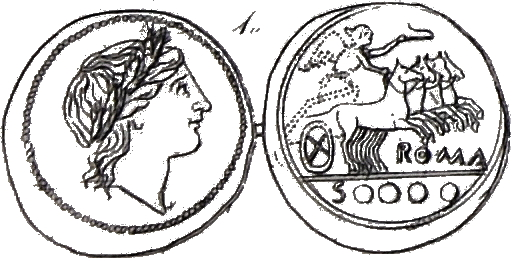
First side of the image: Head of Ceres
Second side of the image: Victory on quadriga. Below ROMA. in exergue: S••••; above missing.
Crawford 97/9, 97/16, 97/23.
Half-victoriatus
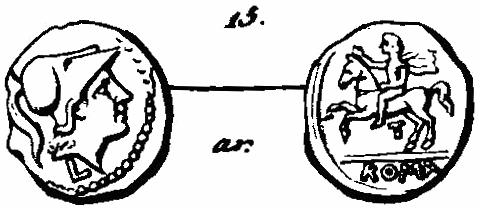
First side of the image: Helmeted head of Minerva turned right, below.
Second side of the image: Knight left; below “T”; [behind “S”]; ROMA in exergue
Crawford 98A/2; Riccio class IV, 15
Semuncia
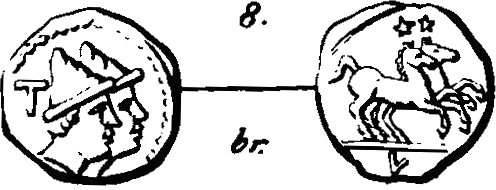
First side of the image: Judicial heads of the Dioscuri, T behind.
Second side of the image: Horses of the Dioscuri; in exergue.
Crawford 98A/8 (Riccio, table IV).

To this period belong the series identified as 97, 98A, 98B, and 99 by Crawford. They are thus a large number of coins, comprising both silver and bronze, and were struck by Rome at Luceria during the Second Punic War. The coins are numbered with the series number and the value number within the series (e.g. 97/1). Any variants are distinguished by a letter (97/1a).

==== First series ====
Crawford divides the first of the series, 97, into six groups. To the first group belong a victoriatus and a quinarius, both silver denominations.

The victoriatus is similar to Roman coins with this denomination and differs substantially only in the presence of the letter on the reverse that is located between the trophy and Victory effigy on the reverse. Crawford lists three variants, with minor differences, identified as 97/1a, b, c.

The quinarius (Cr. 97/2 to 97/8) is also distinguished by the presence of the letter, in this case on the obverse.

To the second group of the series, consisting exclusively of bronze coins, in addition to the standard coins of Roman Republican issues from the trient to the semuncia, belongs a quincunx (Cr. 97/3) that features the head of Apollo on the obverse, with the letter, and from the Dioscuri and the legend ROMA on the reverse. For the other values the standard types of Roman issues are used, with the galley prow on the reverse and the letter, characterizing the issues. These issues are shown from 97/4 to 97/8.

The standard weight of this second group is based on an as of about 64 g.

The third group (Crawford 97/9 to 97/15) features both standard Roman coins (semis, triente, quadrant, sextant, and uncia) and two non-standard coins: a quincunx and a dextans. The former (Cr. 97/11) the same types as already seen, with Apollo and the Dioscuri; the dextan, a particularly rare coin found only in issues of this mint, has the value of ten ounces and features the head of Ceres on the obverse and a Victory leading a quadriga on the reverse. The figure on the reverse was interpreted by Riccio as Jupiter and consequently drawn with this appearance.

The standard weight of the third group is based on an as of about 45 g.

The fourth group (Crawford 97/16 to 97/21) consists of dextans, semis, trient, quadrant, sextant, and uncia. The types are the same as the previous group. The difference is the standard weight, which in the fourth group is based on an as of about 36 g.

The fifth group (Crawford 97/22 to 97/27) has an as with two variants and some of the designations seen above. The as has as types those standard in Roman coinage, with Janus on the obverse and a ship's prow on the reverse. The other coins are dextans, semis, triente, quadrant, and sextant. The weight is based on an as of about 23.5 g.

The sixth group is represented only by an as with an average weight of about 9 g on which Janus is depicted.

==== Second series ====
This second series, cataloged as Crawford 98A, is characterized by the presence of the letters and Τ. The series includes 8 denominations, is dated in the years 211-210 BCE, and includes four silver and 4 bronze coins. The silver coins are: victoriatus, half-victoriatus, quinarius, and silver sestertius. The weight of the coins is based on a denarius of about 4.5 g.

The half-victoriatus is a particularly rare coin, found only in this mintage; it features Minerva's head with a Corinthian helmet on the obverse and a horseman on the reverse. The sestertius, worth a quarter denarius, is also a coin rarely minted during the republic. The silver denominations, apart from the half-victoriatus, show the standard types. The victoriatus has Jupiter's head on the obverse and Victory crowning a trophy on the reverse. The quinarius and sestertius have the head of the goddess Rome on the obverse and the Dioscuri on the reverse; in addition to the difference in weight these last two coins are distinguished by the value sign: V (i.e., five) for the quinarius and IIS (i.e., two and a half) for the sestertius.

The bronze coins are: quadrant, sextant, uncia and semuncia. These coins are characterized by the presence of the letter . The quadrant features the type with Mercury's head and a prora which is the standard of Roman coinage of the period. The other coins present different types. The sextant has Minerva's head on the obverse and the Dioscuri on the reverse, the uncia the helmeted heads of Rome on the obverse and the Dioscuri on the reverse while the semuncia shows the heads of the Dioscuri on the obverse and their horses on the reverse. The same types were present in the coinage of equal value in the early coinage minted at the mint of Luceria.

==== Third series ====
The third series, cataloged as Crawford 98B, consists only of a quinarius with the helmeted head of Rome and the Dioscuri on the reverse. Its relevance to Luceria is not certain.

==== Fourth series ====
This series, cataloged as Crawford 99, is characterized by the presence of the letters, an archaic form of the Greek letter Π, i.e., pi in the Greek alphabet; it consists exclusively of bronze coins.

The series is divided into two groups. To the first group belong nine denominations ranging from the as to the half-as comprising, in addition to the standard values of Roman bronze coinage of the time, the dextant. The types of the coins are those already seen in the first series. The difference is in the legends, which feature the letter already seen, and in the average weight of the reference axis, which in this case is about 22.5 g.

The second group consists exclusively of an as, with Janus and a ship's prow. The coin has a weight of about 28 g and is separated from the others for this reason. Crawford speculates that the letter may represent the initials of the monetary magistrate.

== Findings ==
Thompson et al. list a single treasure that includes coins from Luceria, denoted by the number 2046. It was found in 1854 at Campo Laurelli, “three miles north of Toro,” near Campobasso. The treasure is described in the 1855 Neapolitan Archaeological Bulletin. The find consists of 86 silver coins and 13 bronzes. The bronzes are 7 from Rome, of which 2 are cast and the others hammered, one comes from Arpi, also in Apulia, one from Teate, and three are unclassifiable. The coin from Luceria is an aes grave identified as a “triente”; it may be the quadrunx cataloged as HN Italy 671. The article describes all the coins found at the archaeological site without further specification.

The paucity of contextualized finds, only one coin in all, does not allow for information on dating and circulation.

== Legends and epigraphy ==
The alphabet used is the Latin alphabet of the late 3rd century BCE: the letters U and L are rendered as V and.

The cast series are characterized by the presence of the letter alone, while the hammered series features the ethnic in the form oVCERI.

== Weights ==
=== Silver coins ===
For silver coins, the monetary foot used is the same as that of the Romans, based on a denarius weighing about 4.5 g. Victoriatii have an average weight of 2.98 g and quinarius 2.02 grams. The weight of specimens tends to be less than the theoretical weight due to wear and tear.

=== Bronze coins ===
Bronze coins have different weights in the various coinages.

==== Cast coins of the early period ====
Some (HN Italy 668) have an average weight of 327 g, while others (HN Italy 669) weigh 282 g those with names and 226 g those without.

==== Cast coins of the second period ====
The reference as calculated on the quincunx is 224 g (HN Italy 670-675).

==== Cast coins of the third period ====
The as of this series is 79 g (HN Italy 676-677).

==== Hammered coinage ====
This one is struck around a theoretical as of about 40 g (HN Italy 678-684).

==== Roman coinage ====
The Crawford 97 series has in the second group (the first consists only of silver coins) a foot of about 64 g, in the third about 45 g, in the fourth about 36 g, in the fifth about 23.5, and the sixth group's as has an as of 9 g.

The second series, cataloged as Crawford 98A, has a foot with an as of 54 grams and the one cataloged as Crawford 99, the fourth, an as of about 22.5 grams.

== See also ==
- Lucera
- Roman currency
- Daunians
- Coinage of Aesernia

== Bibliography ==
- Titus Livius. Ab Urbe Condita [History of Rome] (in Latin). Vol. IX.
- Diodorus Siculus. XIX, 72.
- Allen Sydenham, Edward (1926). Aes Grave A Study of the Cast Coinages of Rome and Central Italy. London: Spink.
- Appold Grueber, Herbert (1906). "The coinage of Luceria". Corolla Numismatica: Numismatic essays in honour of Barclay V. Head. London. pp. 115–134.
- Catalli, Fiorenzo (1995). Monete dell'Italia antica [Coins of ancient Italy] (in Italian). IPZS. ISBN 88-240-3977-4.
- De Troia, Alfonso (1925). Catalogo delle monete di Lucera [Catalog of the coins of Lucera] (in Italian) (2nd ed.). Lucera.
- H. Crawford, Michael (1974). Roman Republican coinage. London: Cambridge University Press.
- Haeberlin, Ernst (1910). Aes Grave, Das Schwergeld Roms und Mittelitaliens einschließlich der ihm vorausgehenden Rohbronzewährung [Aes Grave, The heavy money of Rome and central Italy including the preceding raw bronze currency] (in German). Halle.
- Klütz, Konrad (2004). Münznamen und ihre Herkunft [Coin names and their origin] (in German). Vienna: moneytrend Verlag. ISBN 3-9501620-3-8.
- La Notte, Vincenzo (2011). La monetazione della Daunia. Storia degli studi e analisi della produzione [The Coinage of Daunia. History of studies and analysis of production] (in Italian). Foggia.
- N. Rutter, Keith (1997). Greek coinages of Southern Italy and Sicily. London: Spink. ISBN 0-907605-82-6.
- N. Rutter, Keith; et al. (et al.) (2001). Historia Nummorum - Italy. London: British Museum Press. ISBN 0-7141-1801-X.
- Riccio, Gennaro (1846). Le monete attribuite alla zecca dell'antica città di Luceria [Coins attributed to the mint of the ancient city of Luceria] (in Italian). Naples: Tipografia Virgilio.
- Siciliano, Aldo (1993). "La monetazione di Luceria" [The coinage of Luceria]. Lucera antica: l'età pre-romana e romana [Ancient Lucera: the pre-Roman and Roman ages] (in Italian). Lucera: Convegno di Lucera.
- Thompson, Margaret; Mørkholm, Otto; M. Kraay, Colin, eds. (1973). An Inventory of Greek Coin Hoards (IGCH). New York: ANS. ISBN 978-0-89722-068-2.
- Vincent Head, Barclay (1911). Historia Numorum: a Manual of Greek Numismatics (2nd ed.). London: Oxford.
- Vecchi, Italo (2013). Italian Cast Coinage, A descriptive catalogue of the cast coinage of Rome and Italy. London: London Ancient Coins. ISBN 978-0-9575784-0-1.
- E. Fisher, Joan, ed. (1969). SNG American Numismatic Society, Part 1: Etruria-Calabria. New York: American Numismatic Society.
- Schwabacher, Willy; Breitenstin, Niels, eds. (1981). SNG Copenhagen, Vol. One: Italy, Sicily. Copenhagen: Danish National Museum.
- Parente, Anna Rita, ed. (2003). SNG France, Vol. 6, Part 1: Italie (Étrurie-Calabre) [SNG France, Vol. 6, Part 1: Italy (Etruria-Calabria)] (in French). Paris: Bibliothèque Nationale de France / Numismatica Ars Classica. ISBN 2-7177-2232-7.
- Price, Martin, ed. (1995). SNG Great Britain. Vol. 10: The John Morcom collection of Western Greek bronze coins. Oxford: Oxford University Press. ISBN 0197261523.
