= Gaetano De Sanctis =

Italian historian and politician (1870–1957)

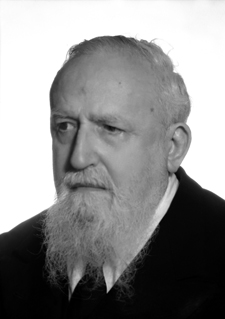
- Born: 15 October 1870; Rome, Italy
- Died: 9 April 1957 (aged 86); Rome, Italy
- Education: Sapienza University of Rome
- Occupation: Historian
- Known for: Senator for life (1950), President of Treccani

Gaetano De Sanctis (15 October 1870 in Rome – 9 April 1957) was an Italian ancient historian, classicist and lifetime senator (1950–1957). As the collection of his 'scritti minori' illustrates, his scope of scholarship ranged from Homer down to the Byzantine Empire. He was the influential teacher of Arnaldo Momigliano. His work 'Storia dei Romani' could be considered a monumental work.

De Sanctis became chair of ancient history desk at the University of Rome in 1929. In 1931, he was one of only twelve professors who refused to swear a decreed oath of allegiance to the Fascist regime (Giuramento di fedeltà al fascismo) under Benito Mussolini. As a result, his professional career was severely curtailed until after World War II.

He was governing commissar of the Italian Numismatic Institute from 1944 to 1952 and president of the "Istituto dell'Enciclopedia Italiana" (Treccani) from 1947 to 1954. He was elected to the American Philosophical Society in 1946.

Gaetano De Sanctis is considered by many as the most eminent Roman historian of the twentieth century.

== Writings ==
- Storia dei Romani:
  - I. Roma dalle origini alla monarchia, Milano-Torino, 1907
  - II. La conquista del primato in Italia, Milano-Torino, 1907.
  - III.1. L'età delle guerre puniche, Milano-Torino, 1916.
  - III.2. L'età delle guerre puniche, Milano-Torino, 1917.
  - IV.1. La fondazione dell'Impero: dalla battaglia di Naraggara alla battaglia di Pidna. Milano-Torino, 1923.
  - IV.2/1. Vita e pensiero nell'età delle grandi conquiste. Firenze, 1953.
  - IV.2/2. Dal diritto quiritario al diritto pretorio. Firenze, 1957.

His shorter works are collected and indexed as:

- Scritti minori, I-VI, Roma, Edizioni di Storia e Letteratura (99, 117, 122, 125–126), 1966–1972.
