= House of the Surgeon =

House in the ancient city of Pompeii

Coordinates: 40.7516°N 14.4819°E

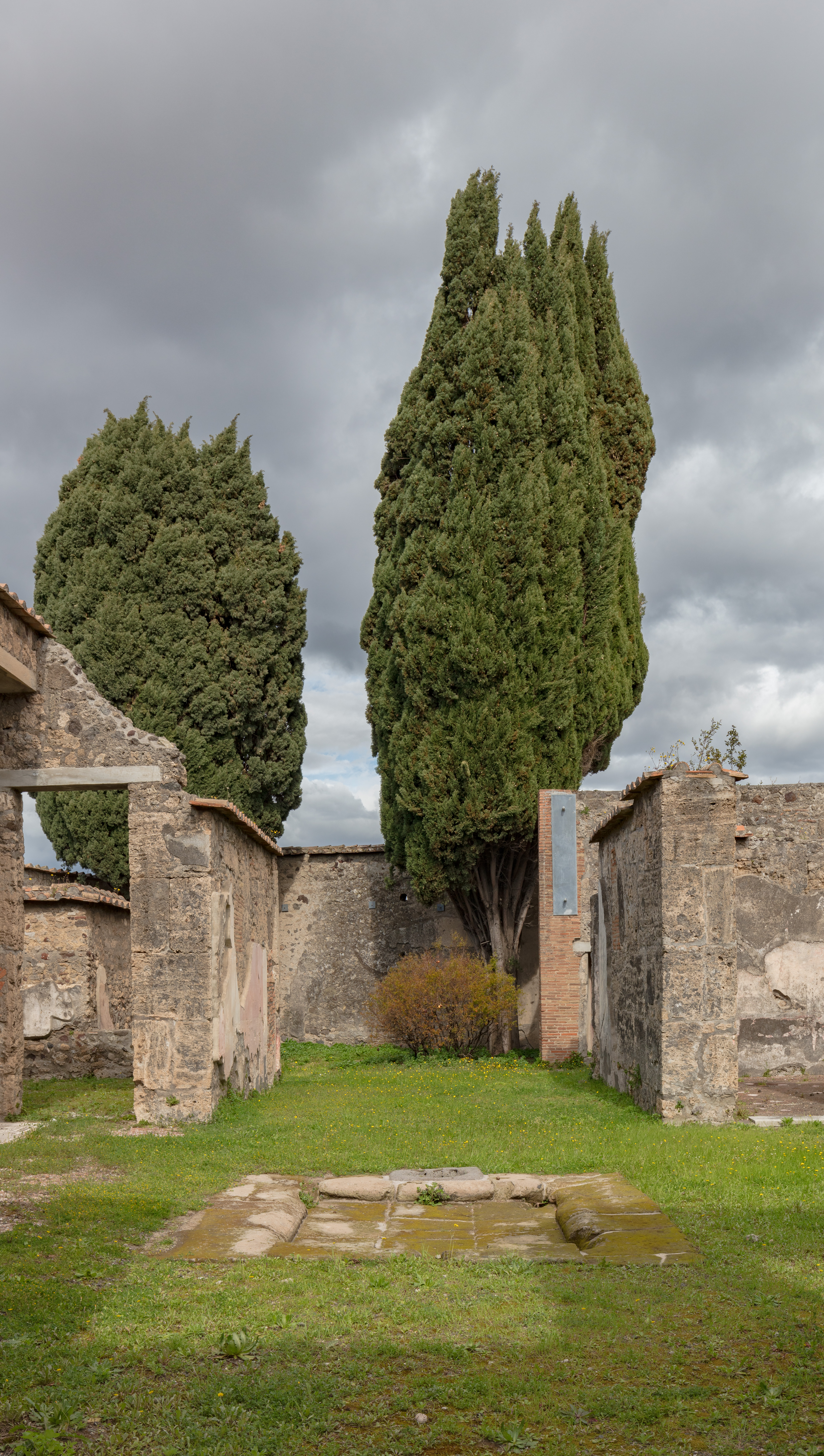

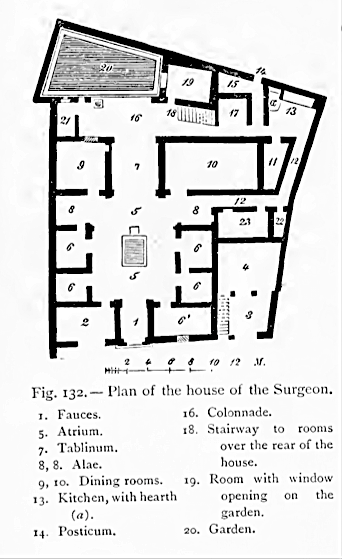
Ground plan (Mau 1902)

Pompeii map

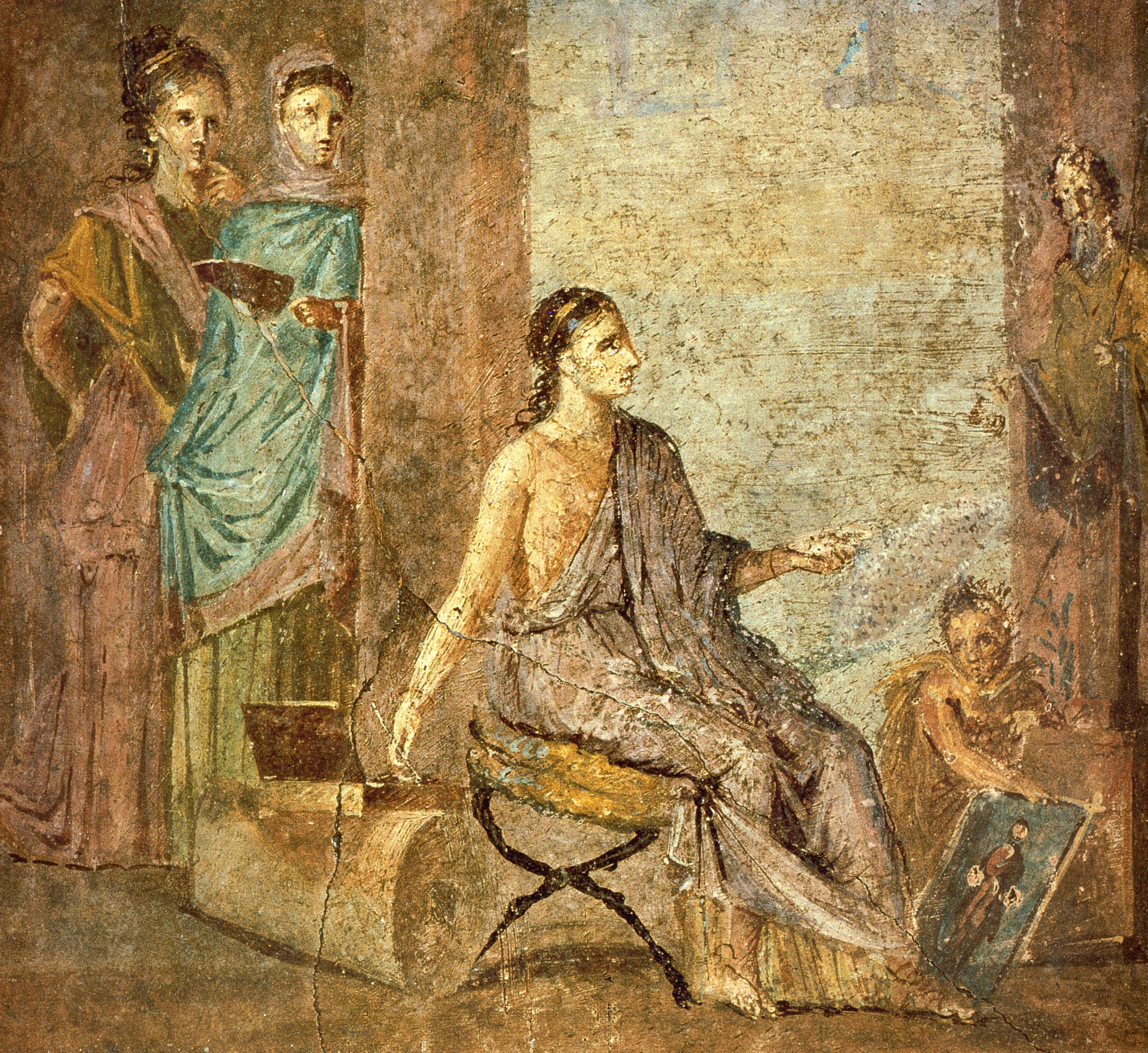
Woman painting a herm of Dionysus

The House of the Surgeon is one of the most famous houses in the ancient Roman city of Pompeii and is named after ancient surgical instruments that were found there. Along with the rest of the city, it was buried and largely preserved under 4 to 6 m of volcanic ash and pumice in the Eruption of Mount Vesuvius in 79 AD. It was excavated in 1770 by Francesco La Vega.

== Description ==
It is modest in size and has little ornament or decoration externally but is strong and sturdy in build with its opus quadratum ashlar façade in Sarno stone, and opus africanum construction of the atrium courtyard. It was an elite residence as evidenced by the atrium being surrounded by rooms on all four sides and its rather exclusive vestibulum.

== Construction date ==
For a long time, the house was thought to be one of the oldest examples in Pompeii with a date of the fourth–third century BC derived from the wall construction. However, in 1926 A. Maiuri made some excavations beneath the atrium which revealed an earlier layer of building rubble in which a late third century BC (214/212 BC) coin was found, which with the third–second century BC date of the earlier wall beneath the tablinum, suggests that the house is dated to no earlier than c.200 BC. However, the results were never published.

== Derelict state during the 1st century ==
In the final years of Pompeii, unlike its neighbour, the House of the Vestals (Pompeii), which had blossomed into one of the more luxurious homes in the area. The house seems to have been allowed to fall derelict, as the floor between the atrium and tablinum had fallen into a large cistern below, wooden posts were inserted into the floors of many rooms to support a damaged roof, and one room was used as a lime-storage tank.

== Modifications ==
In 2005, a further sub-79 AD-level excavation was made of the whole insula VI 1. It was shown that the atrium was modified in the 2nd century BC to provide more light to the interior, by adding a compluvium and accompanying impluvium to the previously full roof covering. The remainder of the house, however, was left mostly as it was, so it was indeed one of the earliest Italic-style houses found so far in Campania.

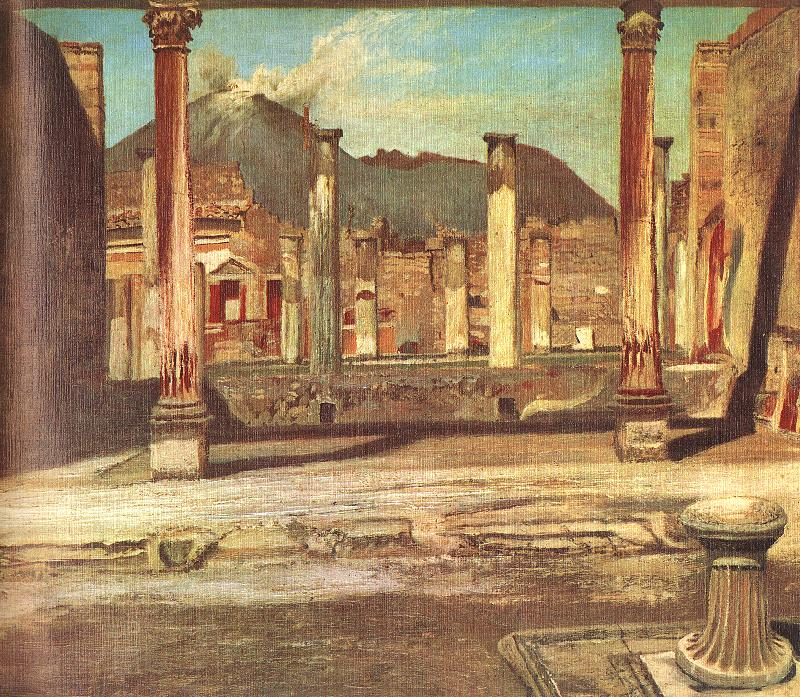
House of the surgeon, late 19th-century painting by Tivadar Kosztka Csontváry
