= Julius Friedländer (numismatist) =

German numismatist (1813–1884)

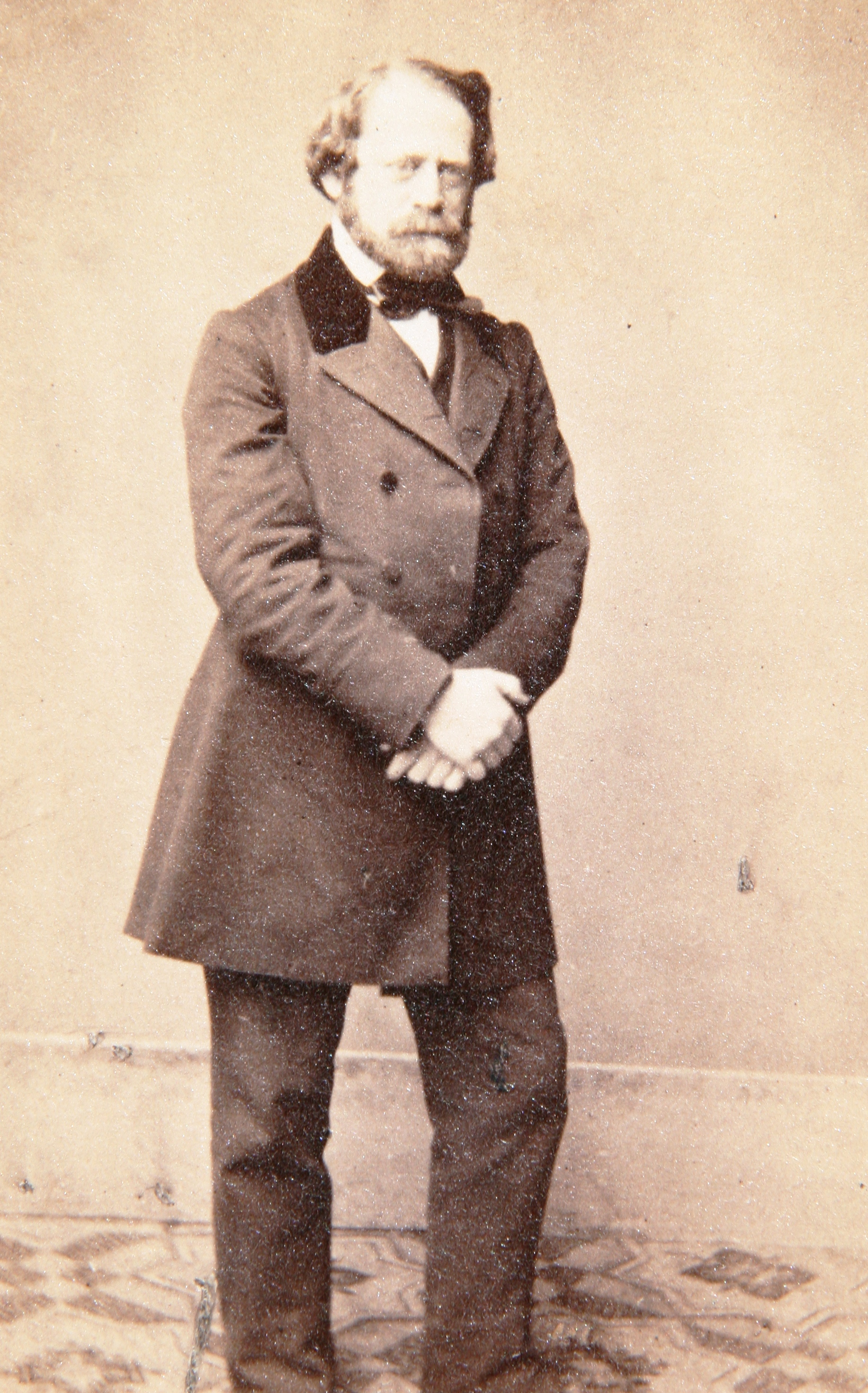
- Born: 25 June 1813; Berlin
- Died: 4 April 1884 (aged 70)

Eduard Julius Theodor Julius Friedländer (25 June 1813 – 4 April 1884) was a German numismatist.

== Biography ==
He was born on 25 June 1813 in Berlin. Friedländer's entire family embraced Protestant Christianity in 1820. After studying at the universities of Bonn and Berlin, and traveling in Italy (1838–1839), he obtained a position at the Königliche Sammlung der Antiken-Münzen in Berlin in 1840. During his travels to Italy (1844–1847) with his friend Theodor Mommsen he acquired further numismatic material which he brought to Berlin. In 1868 he became director of the numismatic section of the Berlin Museum. In 1872 he was elected a member of the Berlin Academy of Sciences.

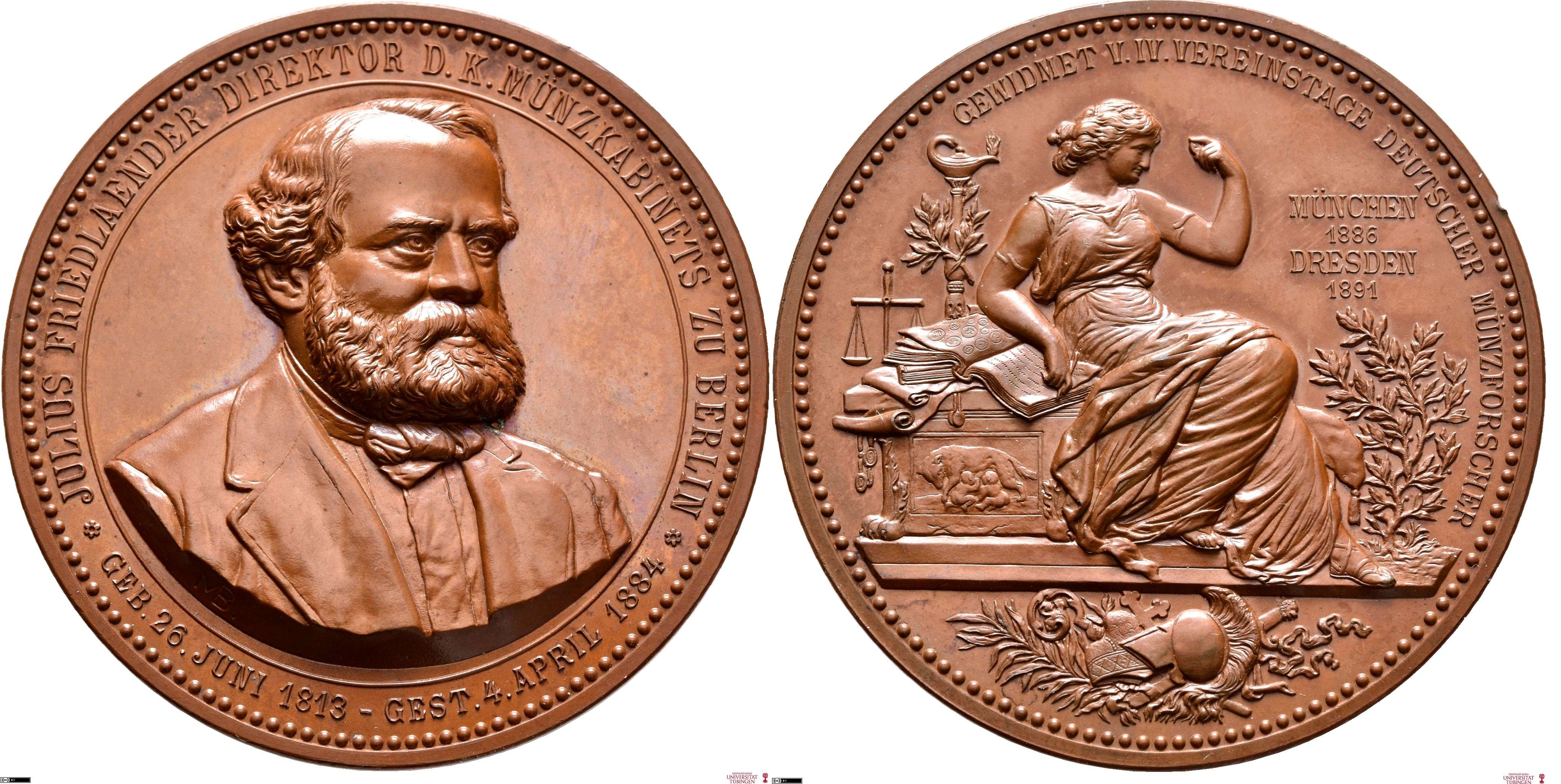
Medal Julius Friedlaender 1891

From his literary remains Rudolf Weil published Repertorium zur Antiken Numismatik, a supplement to Théodore Edme Mionnet's Description des Médailles Antiques, Berlin, 1885. In 1891, in occasion of the 5th convention of German numismatists in Dresden a medal was issued in his honour.

== Literary works ==
Besides numerous papers in numismatic journals, he wrote:

- "Die Münzen des Johanniterordens auf Rhodos", (English: Coins of the Knights of Rhodes), Berlin, 1843
- "Die Münzen Justinians", (with Moritz Pinder), (English: Coins of Justinian), 1843
- "Die Münzen der Ostgothen", (English: Coins of the Ostrogoths), ib. 1844
- "Die Münzen der Vandalen", (English: Coins of the Vandals), ib. 1849
- "Die Oskischen Münzen", (English: Oscan Coins), Leipzig, 1850
- "Das Königliche Münzkabinet", (with Von Sallet), (English: The Royal Coin Cabinet), 2d ed., Berlin, 1877
- Supplement, 1882
- "Die Italienischen Schaumünzen des 15. Jahrhunderts", (English: Italian Medals of the 15th Century), ib. 1880-82
- "Verzeichnis von Griechischen Münzen, Welche aus Modernen Stempeln Geprägt Sind", (English: List of modern Greek coins and stamps), ib. 1883
