= Isernia =

Isernia Sèrnia
- Comune
- Città di Isernia
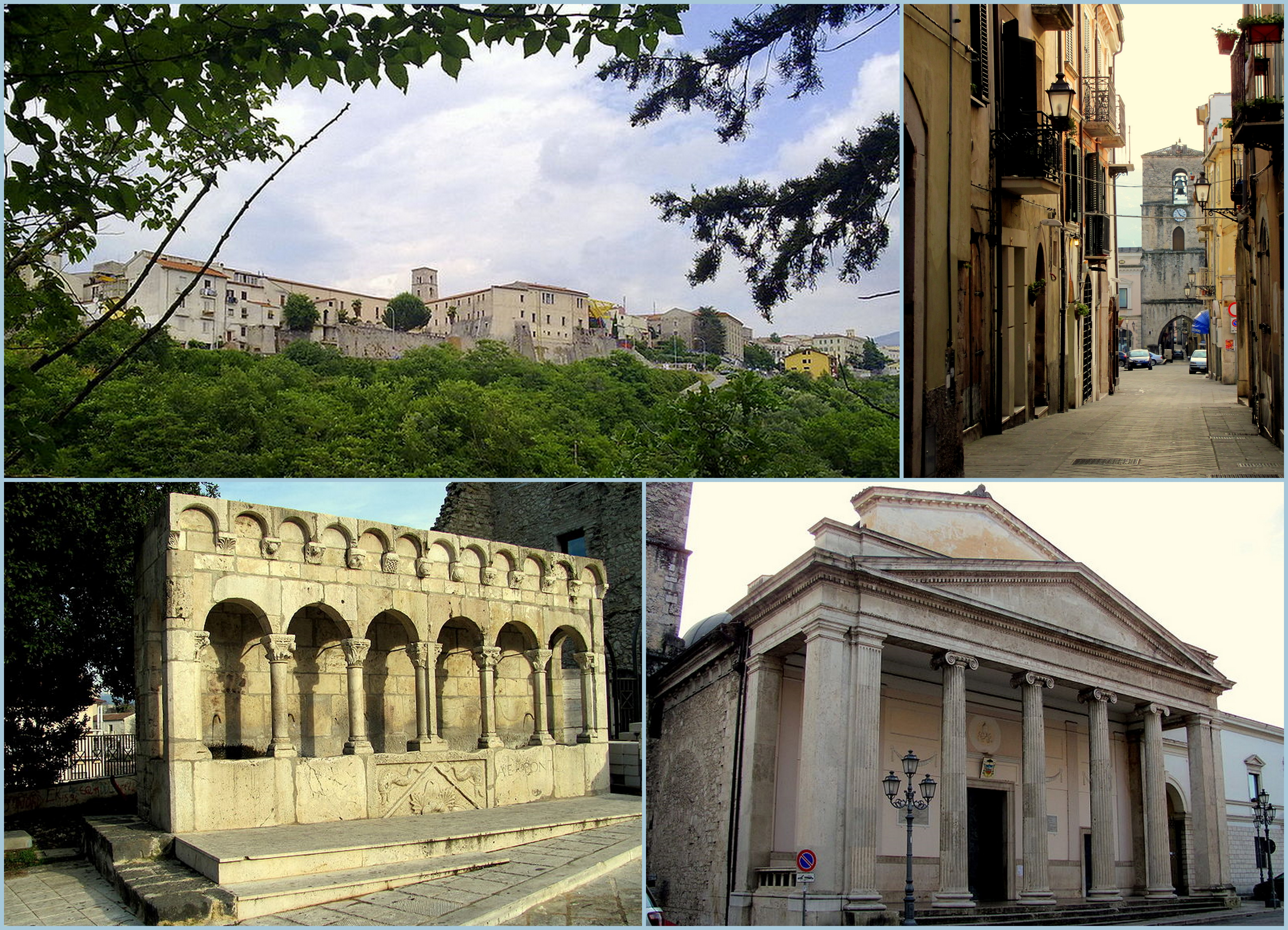
- Top left: Landscape of Isernia, Top right: "Corso Marcelli" Street, Bottom left: Fontana Fraterna, Bottom right: "San Pietro" Cathedral

- Flag Coat of arms

- Location within Italy Location within Molise
- Coordinates: 41°36′10″N 14°14′23″E
- Country: Italy
- Region: Molise
- Province: Isernia (IS)
- Frazioni: Acquazolfa, Bazzoffie, Breccelle, Capruccia, Castagna, Castelromano, Colle de' Cioffi, Colle Martino, Colle Pagano, Collecroci, Conocchia, Coppolicchio, Fragnete, Marini, Salietto, Valgianese

Government
  - Mayor: Piero Castrataro

Area
  - Total: 68.74 km^{2} (26.54 sq mi)
- Elevation: 423 m (1,388 ft)

Population (31 December 2021)
  - Total: 20,863
  - Density: 303.5/km^{2} (786.1/sq mi)
- Demonym: Isernini
- Time zone: UTC+1 (CET)
  - Summer (DST): UTC+2 (CEST)
- Postal code: 86170
- Dialing code: 0865
- Patron saint: Pope Celestine V
- Saint day: May 19
- Website: Official website

Isernia (Italian pronunciation: [iˈzɛrnja]) (Note: Latin: Aesernia or, in Pliny and later writers, Eserninus, or in the Antonine Itinerary, Serni.) is a town and comune in the southern Italian region of Molise, and the capital of the province of Isernia.

== Geography ==
Situated on a rocky crest rising from 350 to 475 metres (1,148 to 1,558 ft) between the Carpino and the Sordo rivers, the plan of Isernia still reflects the ancient layout of the Roman town, with a central wide street, the cardo maximus, still represented by Corso Marcelli, and side streets at right angles on both sides.

The comune of Isernia includes 16 frazioni. The most densely populated is Castelromano which is positioned in a plain at the base of the La Romana mount, elevation 862 metres (2,828 ft), 5 kilometres (3 mi) from Isernia.

=== Climate ===
According to the Köppen climate classification, Isernia experiences a mid-latitude humid subtropical climate (Cfa) bordering on a hot-summer Mediterranean climate (Csa), if the alternative criteria of <40mm mean precipitation in the driest month is used.

== History ==
The city's Roman name, Aesernia, reflects probably a former Samnite toponym, but a connection to an Indo-European root, aeser, which means "water", is tenuous.

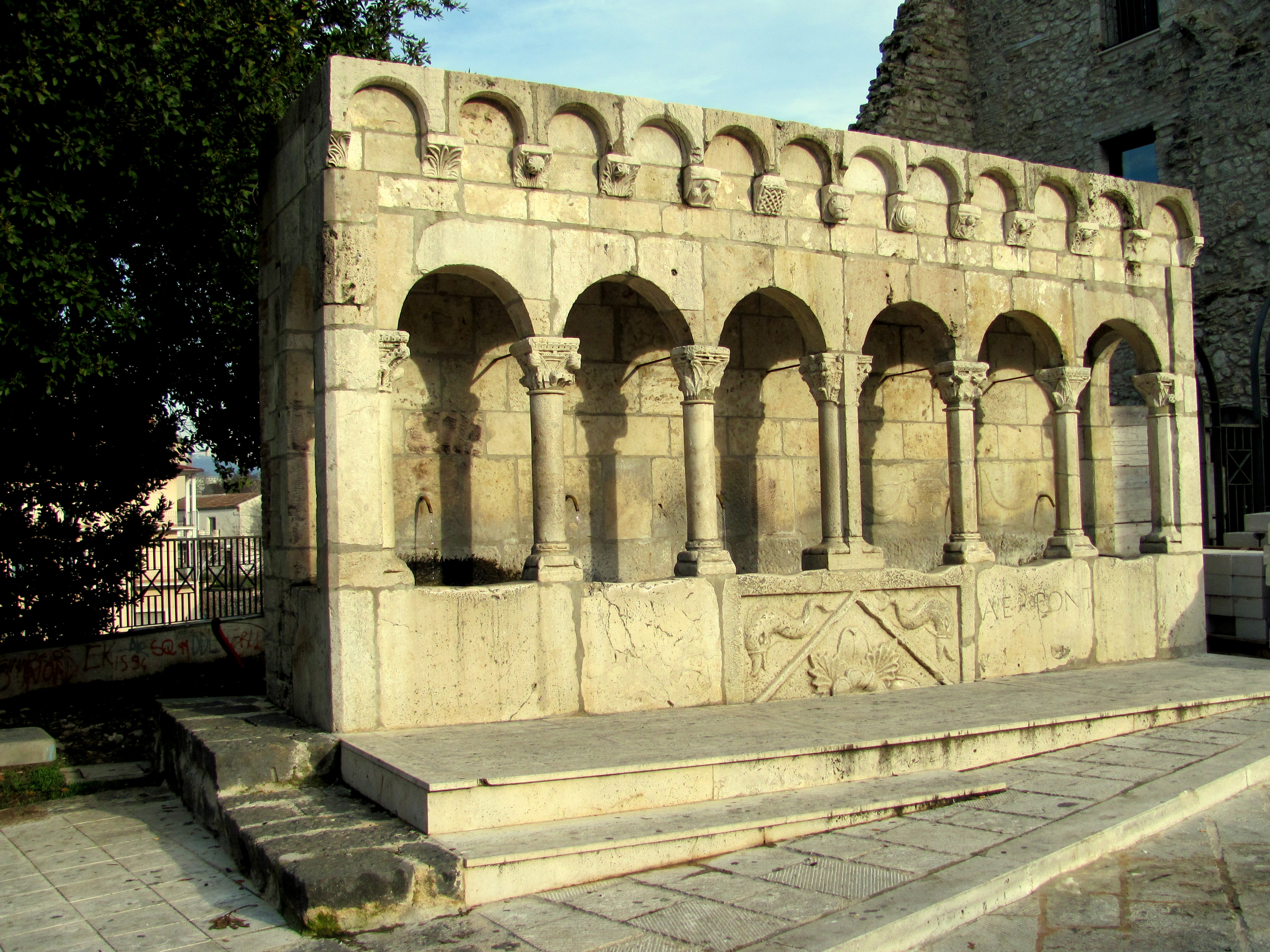
Fontana Fraterna

Classical Aesernia was a city of Samnium, included within the territory of the Pentri tribe, situated in the valley of the Vulturnus (modern Volturno), on a small stream flowing into that river, and distant 22 kilometres (14 mi) from Venafrum (modern Venafro). The Itinerary (in which the name is written "Serni") places it on the road from Aufidena to Bovianum, at the distance of 45 kilometres (28 mi) from the former, and 29 kilometres (18 mi) from the latter; but the former number is corrupt, as are the distances in the Tabula Peutingeriana.

The first mention of it in history occurs in 295 BC, at which time it had already fallen into the hands of the Romans, together with the whole valley of the Vulturnus. After the complete subjugation of the Samnites, a colony, with Latin rights (colonia Latina) was settled there by the Romans in 264 BC the city, a key communication center between southern Italy and the inner Appennine Regions. This colony is again mentioned in 209 BC as one of the eighteen which remained faithful to Rome at the most trying period of the Second Punic War. During the Social War it adhered to the Roman cause, and was gallantly defended against the Samnite general Vettius Scato, by Marcus Claudius Marcellus, nor was it till after a long protracted siege that it was compelled by famine to surrender, 90 BC. Henceforth it continued in the hands of the confederates; and at a later period of the contest afforded a shelter to the Samnite leader, Gaius Papius Mutilus, after his defeat by Lucius Cornelius Sulla. It even became for a time, after the successive fall of Corfinium (modern Corfinio) and Bovianum, the headquarters of the Italic League. At this time it was evidently a place of importance and a strong fortress, but it was so severely punished for its defection by Sulla after the final defeat of the Samnites in 88 BC, that Strabo speaks of it as in his time utterly deserted.

We learn, however, that a colony was sent there by Julius Caesar, and again by Augustus; but apparently with little success, on which account it was recolonized under Nero. It never, however, enjoyed the rank of a colony, but appears from inscriptions to have been a municipal town of some importance in the time of Trajan and the Antonines. To this period belong the remains of an aqueduct and a fine Roman bridge, still visible; while the lower parts of the modern walls present considerable portions of polygonal construction, which may be assigned either to the ancient Samnite city, or to the first Roman colony. The modern city is still the see of a bishop. The massively constructed podium now underlying the cathedral probably supported the Capitolium.

In the early 7th century AD, what are today the comuni of Isernia as well as Bojano and Sepino were the places where Grimoald I of Benevento settled a group of Bulgars, seeking refuge from the Avars; the Bulgars were for many generations a distinctive part of the population, until finally assimilated in their Italian environment (see Bulgarians in Italy, Old Great Bulgaria#Bulgars in Southern Italy).

Even after the fall of the Western Roman Empire, Isernia has suffered destruction numerous times in history. Isernia was destroyed by the Saracens in 800, sacked by Markward of Anweiler, Count of Molise, in 1199, and set on fire in 1223 by the soldiers of Frederick II. In 1519 it was freed from feudal servitude by Charles V, Holy Roman Emperor and became a city in the Kingdom of Naples.

Earthquakes in 847, 1349, 1456 and 1805 caused massive destruction.

During the era of Fascist Italy, Isernia was the site of a small fascist internment camp administered and operated by the province of Campobasso. The camp was located in a former Benedictine convent and was said to hold mostly Italians, with a small number of foreigners, including Slavs, Frenchmen, Germans, Romanians, and people from England, Poland, Hungary, Albania, and Syria. Internees were categorized as "dangerous Italians", "enemy subjects", "foreign Jews", and "former Yugoslav" citizens. Some of the prisoners were killed during the 1943 allied bombing raid.

On the morning of September 10, 1943, during World War II, American planes launched their bombs from B-17 Flying Fortress planes over a crowded town on market day causing thousands of deaths. In the following weeks they came back twelve times without ever hitting their targets: the bridges of Isernia, Cardarelli and Santo Spirito, then built entirely of iron, towards the internal area. All the bridges were vital to the German retreat.

In 1970 Isernia became the capital of the province of the same name, created out of part of the province of Campobasso.

== Economy ==
The hills around Isernia produces red, white and rose Pentro di Isernia, an Italian DOC wine. The grapes are limited to harvest yields of 11 tonnes/ha with the finished red and rose wines needing a minimum alcohol level of 11% and the finished whites required to have at least 10.5% alcohol. The reds and roses are composed of 45-55% Montepulciano, 45-55% Sangiovese and up to 10% local grape varieties to fill out the blend if needed. The whites are composed of 60-70% Trebbiano, 30-40% Bombino bianco and up to 10% local varieties to fill out the blend if needed.

== Coinage ==
The coins of Aesernia, which are found only in copper, and have the legend "AISERNINO", belong to the period of the first Roman colony; the style of their execution attests the influence of the neighboring Campania.

== Main sights ==
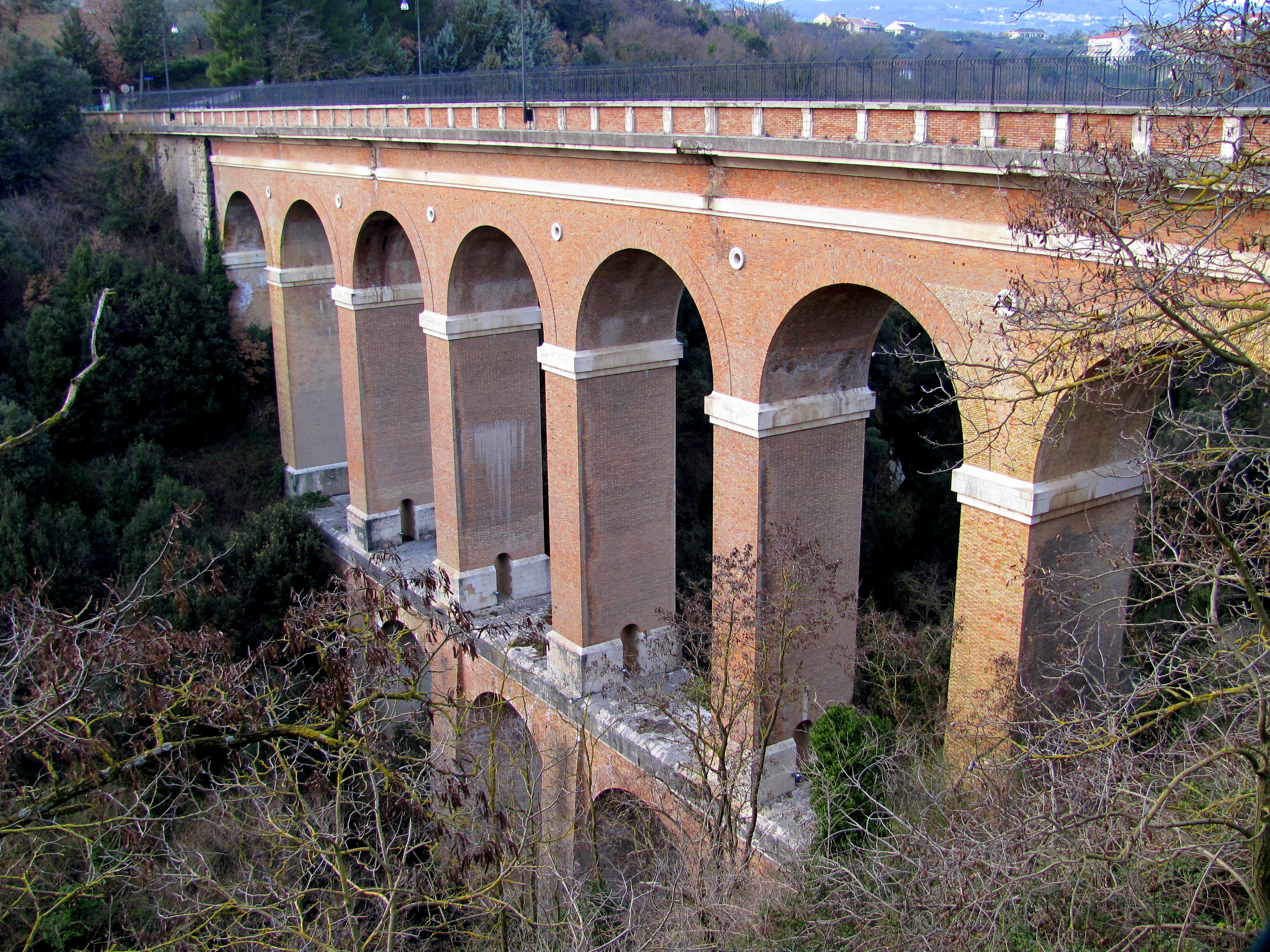
Cardarelli Stone Bridge.

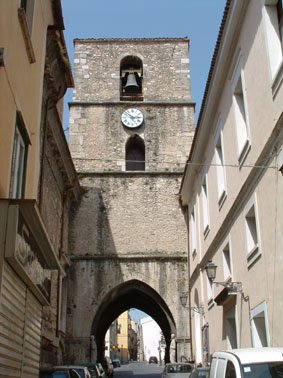
San Pietro Arch.

Although having suffered repeated destruction, Isernia preserves a large number of archaeological remains. The historical center still keeps intact the spare map structure of the Roman cities: in fact it represents the largest raced Marcelli street, around which there is an infinity of alleys and little spares, as for example, "Trento e Trieste" spares. The famous Fraterna Fountain, the town's main symbol, was built in the 13th century: it is made up of living stone's slabs coming from ruined Roman monuments, while all the rest is a work of local masters, commissioned by the Rampini family of Isernia.

=== Religious sites ===
- Isernia Cathedral of San Pietro
- Santa Maria delle Monache
- San Francesco
- Santa Chiara
- Santi Cosma e Damiano
- Chiesa della Concezione
- San Pietro Celestino
- San Giuseppe lavoratore
- Santa Maria Assunta

=== Fontana Fraterna ===
The “Fontana Fraterna” is a refined public fountain with six water jets, with an unusual arcade-shape, made of blocks of calcareous, compact stone. It is built of Roman and Romanesque materials, and had been restored in 1835.

The fountain has articulated into three fillets laid one upon the other. From below, there is a series of smooth fillets (the one on the left is a Roman-epoch and fragmentary epigraph with the letters AE PONT, while in the centre there is a mat decorated with dolphins and a Roman-age flower, probably coming from a sepulchral building), then there is a median fillet with a series of six round arches supported, on the left side, by little circular columns and on the right side, by little octagonal columns.

Above these columns there are some capitals of re-employment. Two capitals have trapezoidal-plant abacus and perhaps adorned a window splay. The higher fillet presents a line of smooth ashlars on which twelve little hanging arches set, supported by little brackets adorned with zoomorphic, phytomorphic and geometric motives. On the bottom of the fountain, on a second level in respect to the arcade, you can distinguish two blocks of Roman age with some swags and a funerary epigraph dedicated to the god Mani. On its right side there is a third high-mediaeval epigraph, situated between two lion statues, referring to the building of a fountain. A deep study of the surfaces allows to verify that the blocks were worked on several occasions, with an extremely long interval, and that come from an undefined number of buildings of the town. Therefore, the handiwork represents an interesting abacus of workings, decorative elements, an exemplar of material culture with centuries of town history written on.

=== La Pineta ===
Isernia La Pineta is an archaeological excavation site containing thousands of bones and stone tools covering 20,000 square metres (4.9 acres). It was discovered in 1979, by an amateur naturalist who noticed a bone sticking out of the side of a cut that had been created by the construction of the Napoli-Vasto motorway. The site was clearly created by humans, but its purpose is still unknown.

== See also ==
- F.C. Isernia
- Coinage of Aesernia
