= Secondina Cesano =

Italian numismatist

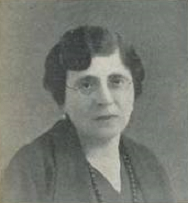
- Born: 16 February 1879; Fossano, Italy
- Died: 13 August 1973 (aged 94); Rome, Italy

Academic background
- Education: Sapienza University of Rome

Academic work
- Discipline: Numismatics

Secondina Lorenza Eugenia Cesano (16 February 1879 - 13 August 1973) was an Italian numismatist and professor of numismatics at the Sapienza University of Rome.

== Biography ==
Cesano originally studied at the Sapienza University of Rome. In 1902 she won a competition and gained a role at the National Roman Museum. In 1907 she gained habilitation in numismatics at Sapienza. She also worked on numismatics in the National Archaeological Museum, Naples and the National Museum of Ravenna. In 1912, at the foundation of the Istituto italiano di numismatica, Cesano was appointed to the board of directors, later becoming its extraordinary commissar from 1943 to 1944.

Cesano was an Honorary Fellow of the Royal Numismatic Society.

== Select publications ==
- 1904 (with Adolf Schulten and Dante Vaglieri) L'Africa romana. Rome: Albrighi.
- 1915. Il medagliere dell'ex-Museo Kircheriano. Parte I, Monete fuse. Roma : Presso la sede dell'Istituto.
- 1921. "La zecca di Roma", Rassegna d'arte antica e moderna 21, 361–368.
- 1957. Catalogo della collezione numismatica di Carlo Piancastelli. Forlí : Soc. Tipo litografia forlivese.
