= Giardino della flora appenninica di Capracotta =

Botanical garden in Italy

Coordinates: 41°50′N 14°16′E

Giardino della flora appenninica di Capracotta (10 hectares) is a botanical garden of alpine flowers located at 1,550 meters altitude at the base of Monte Campo, along the main road towards Prato Gentile in Capracotta, Province of Isernia, Molise, Italy. It is open daily in the warmer months.

The garden was established in 1963 for plant trials, abandoned for almost two decades, and reopened in 1997 as a collaboration between the municipality of Capracotta and the University of Molise. Although the garden contains some flower beds, it is primarily a natural area.

The garden currently contains about 300 endemic species in habitats including beech forest, rocks and cliffs, scrub, and wetlands. It also contains about 200 species introduced from elsewhere in the south-central Apennine Mountains. The garden's flowering plants include Allium ursinum, Anemone apennina, Corydalis cava, Dianthus sylvestris, Galanthus nivalis, Lonicera alpigena, Minuarta graminifolia, Sorbus aucuparia, and Viola reichenbachiana. Trees include Acer pseudoplatanus, Fagus sylvatica, and Ilex aquifolium, with shrubs including Euonymus latifolius, Lonicera alpigena, Rhamnus alpinus, Sambucus nigra, and Viburnum lantana.

== See also ==
- List of botanical gardens in Italy
