= Giovanni Carnevale =

Italian Salesian priest and schoolteacher (1924–2021)

Giovanni Carnevale

Giovanni Carnevale (4 August 1924 – 11 April 2021) was an Italian Salesian priest and schoolteacher who wrote on early medieval history. He held no academic or heritage-service post, and pursued his historical research independently after the end of his teaching career.

He is known as the author of the pseudohistorical identification between the church of San Claudio al Chienti in Corridonia with Charlemagne's palace chapel at Aachen, a thesis regarded as untenable by specialists.

== Biography ==
Giovanni Carnevale was born on 4 August 1924, in Capracotta, in the province of Isernia. Sixth son of his family, he stayed in his native country until the end of elementary school, when he moved to Umbria to attend the gymnasium in Amelia, and then finish in Lazio, to be precise in Frascati. In Lanuvio he attended the classical high school only for two years, and then stopped his studies because of the entry into the war of Italy and the bombing of the allies of Rome. During this period, he continued his studies as an autodidact and obtained his diploma in Terni. He enrolled in La Sapienza in Rome to study law. His path as a priest began in 1947, when he went to Piedmont in the Salesian House of Bagnolo. He remained there until the completion of his studies in 1951 and was ordained a priest in Abano Terme on 29 June of the same year. According to the websites of the study centres devoted to his work, he went on to obtain a degree in letters and one in Christian archaeology, followed by teaching qualifications in letters and art history; these claims are not documented by independent sources.

When he became a teacher, he taught science in Faenza, then in the Salesian high schools of Macerata: classical, linguistic and scientific. He taught until he retired. During this period, he enrolled at Bocconi in Milan, taught German and earned a degree in French and German at the University of Macerata, without ever withdrawing his degree. In 1994, he ceased teaching, although he was sometimes called to replace him.

Studies on the Carolingian age began after his scholastic career, under the influence of Marche structures. In fact, he concentrated mainly on the church of San Claudio al Chienti in Corridonia, assuming that its dating (11th century) was wrong. The turning point came when he discovered a building similar to the abbey existed in France, precisely in Germigny-des-Prés, near Orleans. He came to doubt that Aachen Cathedral in Germany was the Carolingian Palatine Chapel, and maintained that the sources had been misread. Between 1993 and 2021 he set out this reconstruction in a series of self-published and locally published books. According to his studies, Charles Martel, Pepin the Short and Bertrada of Laon are buried in San Ginesio, under the collegiate church of Santa Maria Assunta, while Charlemagne at the church of San Claudio del Chienti.

== Reception ==
Carnevale's reconstruction has found no acceptance among specialists in Carolingian history or in medieval architecture. Reviewing the evidence, Furio Cappelli finds that none of the arguments adduced in its support holds. The building is dated to the eleventh century on stylistic grounds, two centuries after the Carolingian period, and includes solutions characteristic of the late eleventh-century Lombard Romanesque; no supporting archaeological evidence exists. The charter adduced in support of a Carolingian palatium in the Fermo area — Duke Hildeprand of Spoleto's confirmation to Farfa of 787 — contains no reference to the Chienti valley, and the palatium named in it is the ducal palace at Spoleto. Florian Hartmann has examined the method underlying the thesis in the proceedings of the 2023 conference of the Centro di Studi Storici Maceratesi.

The theory nonetheless attracted wide media attention, including an article in The Economist in 2023. In July 2024 a petition signed by more than 200 people, among them 62 university teachers and the historian Alessandro Barbero, asked for the removal from the church of popular material presenting the thesis; the material was removed two months later.

Forced to a wheelchair, in 2016 he obtained honorary citizenship in Corridonia(MC). He died in Macerata on 11 April 2021. His body rests in Capracotta.

== Works ==
- San Claudio al Chienti ovvero Aquisgrana, Sico Editor 1993
- L’enigma di Aquisgrana in Val di Chienti, Sico Editor 1994
- Aquisgrana trafugata, Sico Editor 1996
- La scoperta di Aquisgrana in Val di Chienti, Queen Editore 1999
- San Marone e l'alto medioevo in Val di Chienti, Comune di Civitanova Marche (MC) 2002
- La Val di Chienti e l'alto medioevo carolingio, Comitato studi della presenza Carolingia in val di Chienti 2003
- L'Europa di Carlo Magno nacque in Val di Chienti, Francs editeurs 2008 ISBN 978-88-9033-152-7
- Il Rinvenimento delle sepolture di Pipino il Breve e di sua moglie Berta nella Collegiata di San Ginesio, Comune san Ginesio comunità montana (MC) 2010 also in English
- La scola palatina e la rinascenza carolingia in Val di Chienti, pontificia università Lateranense Pontificio comitato di scienze storiche 2012 also in English
- Il ritrovamento della tomba e del corpo di Carlo Magno a San Claudio, Centro studi San Claudio al Chienti 2013 also in English
- Vita di Carlo Magno imperatore nella Francia Picena, Centro studi San Claudio al Chienti 2014
- Il piceno da Carlo Magno a Enrico I, Edizione Simple 2016 ISBN 978-88-6924-439-1
- Da Carlo Magno alla Roma Picena nuove luci sull'origine dell'europa Edizione Simple 2019 ISBN 978-88-6924-439-1
- Il Piceno nella decadenza della Roma imperiale Edizioni Simple 2021 ISBN 978-88-6924-591-6

== Honours ==
- Knights Hospitaller of the Order of St John of Jerusalem
- honorary citizenship in Corridonia(MC).

== Sources ==
- Cappelli, Furio (2023). "Una pieve in Val di Chienti tra storia, metastoria e magia". Studi Maceratesi (in Italian). 57: 11–33.
- Hartmann, Florian (2024). "Le Marche imperiali: una questione di metodo". Studi Maceratesi (in Italian). 58: 9–26.
- Staffa, Andrea Rosario (2025). "Ai confini settentrionali di Fermo bizantina: la bassa val di Chienti in età altomedievale". Il capitale culturale. Studies on the Value of Cultural Heritage (in Italian) (supplement 18): 107–151. doi:10.13138/2039-2362/3727.
