= Michael Bacht =

German artist (born 1947)

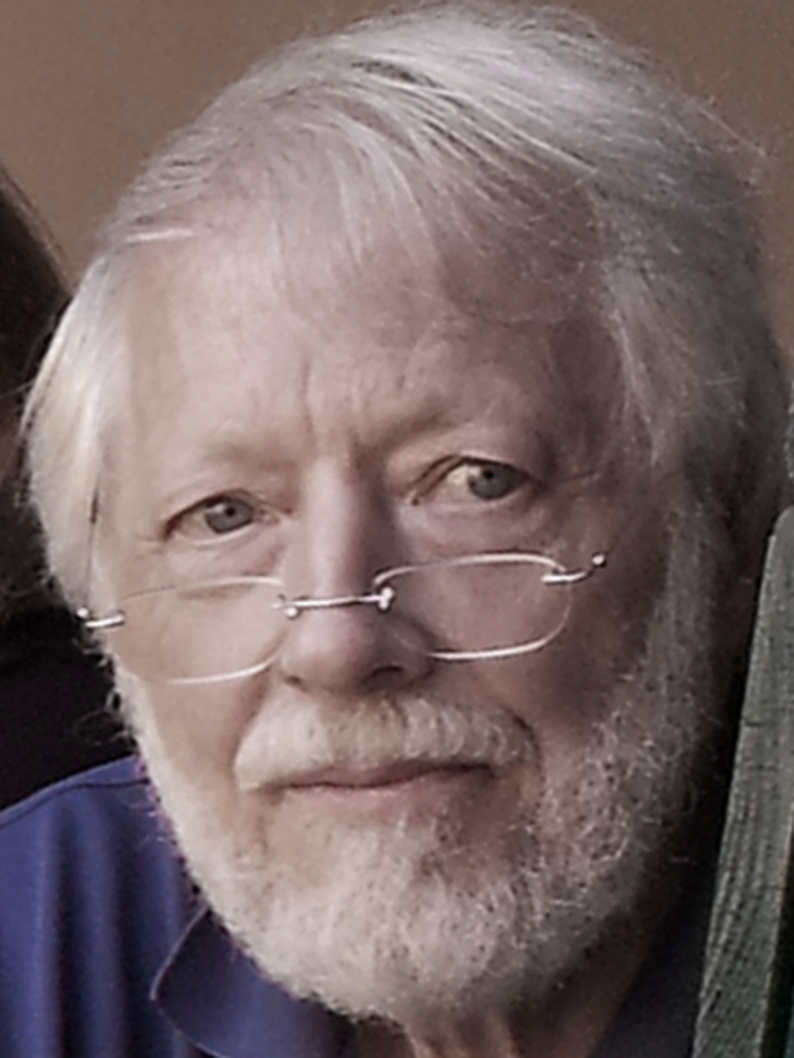
Michael Bacht

Michael Bacht (born 4 June 1947) is a German artist.

== Biography ==
Bacht was born in Remscheid and attended the Burg-Gymnasium, the Carl-Humann-Gymnasium and the Folkwang School for Fine Art in Essen, where from the age of sixteen he studied figurative and nude drawing under the tutelage of Jo Pieper. From 1969 to 1971, upon his recognition as a conscientious objector, he studied art history with Günter Bandmann and philosophy with Ernst Bloch and Dieter Jähnig at the University of Tübingen. A decisive influence at that time was also the close friendship with Karl Ameriks, an expert of German idealism.

In 1972, Bacht continued his studies at the University of Heidelberg. His main interests there were European as well as East Asian fine art and architecture, and his key academic teachers were Peter Anselm Riedl and Dietrich Seckel. His formative encounter with Fritz Wotruba, whose work he cataloged as a doctoral student, also occurred during this period and incited him to pursue studies in fine art at the University of Mainz from 1974 to 1979.

In 1973, Bacht married the judge Brigitte Holzinger from Freiburg, with whom he raised five children.

Since 1979, Bacht has been working as a freelance fine artist with studios in Heidelberg, the former cigar factory Malsch (1987–1990) and, after a conversion that took one year to complete, in the former catholic village church of Epfenbach.

== Work ==
Bacht's aim as an artist is the visualisation of dialectical processes between artistic material and aesthetic design principles that always unfold as respectful mimesis of cyclic laws of nature. Hans Gercke writes, "The wave, writes fascinates him in its polarity of height and depth, light and shade, concave and convex movement, serenity and dynamic". Such elementary experiences, the rhythm that all organic life depends on, the pulse of our bloodstream, the tides, day and night, the seasons, the law of tension and release, are objectified in all work groups and lend aesthetic unity to Bacht's work.

Early work groups, developed from 1975 to 1985, are the embossed prints, followed from 1985 to 1990 by anode pictures. In the late 1980s and 1990s, Bacht created major works like „Shrine for a Stone“ with several variations, the series of book objects, earth circles and makimono pictures as well as his first large-scale floor installations. In 1995, Bacht introduced light as a design instrument. From 2000, a series of critical homages to key figures of classical modernism (Mondrian, Malewitsch) and the White Installations were added to the canon of work groups. Another work group is dedicated to objects and architectonic structures for an alternative sepulchral culture.

All work groups are flanked by an encyclopaedia of satirical objects, assembled under the group title „Kein Wunder“.

== Solo exhibitions ==
- 1980 Galerie der Stadt Mainz, Bilder, Objekte, Graphik
- 1984 Werkstattgalerie Heidelberg, Arbeiten von M.Bacht und G.Kilger
- 1987 Galerie Friebe, Mannheim, Objekte und Bilder
- 1988 Galerie Arterie, Wiesenbach, Arbeiten von 1978–1988 (Kat.)
- 1990 Galerie Friebe, Mannheim, Erinnerung an Makimono (Kat.)
- 1990 Kunstverein Rastatt, Im Kreis (Kat.)
- 1991 Folkwang Museum, Essen, Metamorphose (Kat.)
- 1991 Landesmuseum Mainz, Michael Bacht (KULTURZEIT ET ZETERA)
- 1992 Galerie Hilbur, Karlsruhe, Objekte und Bilder
- 1993 Galerie Friebe, Mannheim, Kein Wunder, Satirische Objekte
- 1994 Galerie Beatrice Wassermann, Köln, Klang der Stille, Objekte und Bilder
- 1995 Galerie Arterie, Wiesenbach, 5 Lichtinstallationen
- 1996 Galerie Monika Beck, Homburg, Kein Wunder, Satirische Objekte 1976–1996
- 1996 Galerie Friebe, Mannheim, Buchobjekte
- 1996 Heidelberger Kunstverein, Installationen, Objekte und Bilder (Kat.)
- 1999 Museum am Ostwall, Dortmund, Lichtinstallationen, Objekte und Bilder (Kat.)
- 2001 Museum Ratingen, Satirische Objekte (Kat.)
- 2004 Stadtgalerie Mannheim, Erinnerungen aus einem Glashaus und andere Arbeiten
- 2005 Lange Nacht der Museen: Wäre schön wenn jemand wieder das Licht anmachte 1 Lichtobjekte und Lichtinstallationen in HD Semmelsgasse 9
- 2007 Kunstforum Heidelberg, Theatrum Mundi – Jeu des cartes Arbeiten von Michael Bacht und Milan Chlumsky
- 2008 Lange Nacht der Museen: Wäre schön wenn jemand wieder das Licht anmachte 2 7 neue Lichtobjekte und Lichtinstallationen in HD Semmelsgasse 9

== Group exhibitions (selection) ==
- 1985 Heidelberger Kunstverein, Der Baum in Mythologie, Kunstgeschichte und Gegenwartskunst (Kat.)
- 1986 Stadtgalerie Saarbrücken, Der Baum (Kat.)
- 1987 Wilhelm-Hack-Museum, Ludwigshafen, Aspekte des Fragmentarischen (Kat.)
- 1987 Museum of Modern Art, Pasadena, Fragments
- 1988 Städtische Kunsthalle Mannheim, 25 Jahre Künstlerbund Rhein-Neckar (Kat.)
- 1988 Kulturhaus Wiesloch, Die Stadt (Kat.) • 1988 Darmstädter Sezession, Darmstadt, Dialog (Kat.)
- 1988 Pfalzgalerie Kaiserslautern, Sickingen Kunstpreis Malerei (Kat.)
- 1989 Skulpturenpark Hirschberg (Bacht, Eckerle, Flora, Kausch, Lepold, Pokorny) (Kat.)
- 1992 Wilhelm Hack-Museum Ludwigshafen, Zufall als Prinzip – Spielwelt, Methode und System in der Kunst des 20. Jahrhunderts (Kat.)
- 1992 Galerie der Jungen, Prag (CSFR), Kunst aus dem Rhein-Neckar-Raum
- 1993 Galerie Hilbur, Karlsruhe, Schwarz-Weiss-Plus, Künstler der Galerie
- 1994 Galerie Karin Friebe, Mannheim, Blick Zurück, Künstler der Galerie
- 1994 Galerie des Archäologischen Museums, Danzig (P), Kunst ohne Grenzen
- 1995 Heidelberger Schloss, Kunsthalle Bratislava (Slo), Seitenwechsel (Kat.)
- 1996 Galerie Grewenig, Heidelberg, Accrochage der Galerie St. Johann Saarbrücken
- 1999 Heidelberger Schloß, Kurfürst Friedrich träumt von Papst Gregor IX, Installation
- 2001 Ev. Stadtkirche am Markt, Karlsruhe, Kirchenträume, Installation
- 2002 Kunstverein Wilhelmshöhe, Ettlingen, Wolfgang-Hartmann-Preis
- 2004 Forum für Kunst Heidelberg, 1889, Installation
- 2008 Heidelberger Kunstverein, Wir hier (G)
- 2016 Forum für Kunst Heidelberg, „…in der Art“ Works in Public Collections
- Arbeitsamt Heidelberg
- Chirurgische Klinik Heidelberg
- Forschungszentrum Karlsruhe
- Grundschule Großsachsen
- Kopfklinik Heidelberg
- Land Baden-Württemberg
- Rathaus der Stadt Heidelberg
- Staatliche Hochschule für Musik Heidelberg-Mannheim
- Stadt Heidelberg
- Stadt Mannheim
- Kunsthalle Mannheim
- Städtische Sammlungen Evian (F)

== Bibliography ==
- Susanne Armbruster, Michael Bacht in der Galerie der Stadt Mainz. SWF II, 9. April 1980
- Hans Gercke (Hrsg.), Der Baum in Mythologie, Kunstgeschichte und Gegenwartskunst.
- Heidelberger Kunstverein/Stadtgalerie Saarbrücken 1985, S.308/309
- Hans Gercke, Zu den Arbeiten von Michael Bacht. Katalog, Heidelberg 1986
- Werner Simon Vogler, Michael Bacht in der Galerie Karin Friebe Mannheim. SWF II, 25. März 1987
- Regina Birmele, Poesie des Paradoxen. Mannheimer Morgen, 1. April 1987
- Rolf Nägele, Erste Annäherung. Katalog, Wiesenbach 1988
- Hans Gercke, Atelierbesuch bei Michael Bacht. Passagen, 4/1989
- Roland Geiger, Ein Ozean voller Möglichkeiten. RNZ, 10. November 1989
- Klaus H. Auler, Das neue Atelier des Bildhauers Michael Bacht. SDR II, 23. Dezember 1989
- Karoline Hille, Schöpfungsmythos und Endzeitvision. RNZ, 29. März 1990
- Christel Heybrock, Verborgene Energien. Mannheimer Morgen, 5. April 1990
- Hans Gercke, Das Prinzip des Polaren. Katalog, Mannheim 1990
- Wolfgang Hartmann, Im Kreis. Kunstverein Rastatt, Rastatt 1990
- Kirsten Voigt, Eine ernste Sicht auf Mensch und Kosmos. BNN, 8. Oktober 1990
- Peter Anselm Riedl, Metamorphose. Bemerkungen zur Kunst Michael Bachts.
- Katalog, Folkwang Museum, Essen 1991
- Rudij Bergmann, Michael Bacht. SDR Fernsehen III. Programm, Kulturzeit et zetera, 23. Mai 1991
- Gerhard Finckh, Metamorphose. Einführung in die Ausstellung. Folkwang-Museum, Essen 1991
- Bernhard Holeczek/Lida von Mengden(Hrsg.) Zufall als Prinzip. Spielwelt, Methode und System in der Kunst des 20. Jahrhunderts. Wilhelm-Hack-Museum, Ludwigshafen 1992, S.194/195,346
- Milan Chlumsky, Die intelligente, fröhliche Kunst. Satirische Objekte bei Friebe. RNZ 17. Juni 1993
- Roland Heinzmann, Kunstszene Kraichgau (I). Die Bildhauer Bacht und Goertz. Kraichgau Jahrbuch 1993
- Rolf Nägele, Dunkelheit: Bedingung der Sichtbarkeit. Zu den Licht- und Schattenobjekten von Michael Bacht. Wiesenbach 1995
- Sven Rech Ausstellung Satirische Objekte von Michael Bacht in der Galerie Monika Beck Homburg, Saarländischer Rundfunk SR III, 25. März 1996
- Leonhard Emmerling Sinnlichkeit und Reflexivität. Künstlerportrait. Meier, 6/96
- Ingo Bartsch, Hans Gercke, Plädoyer für die Langsamkeit.
- Peter Anselm Riedl, Das Chaos bannen. Gedanken zur Kunst Michael Bachts.
- Hans Gercke, Totenstadt und Totenwald. Notizen zu einem Projekt von Michael Bacht. Katolog, Heidelberger Kunstverein und Museum am Ostwall Dortmund, Heidelberg 1996
- Milan Chlumsky, Mondrians Dornenkrone, Frankfurter Allgemeine Zeitung, 7. Juni 1999
- Roland Heinzmann, Katalogbesprechung Michael Bacht, Passagen 3/99
- Tobias Bolsmann, Die Schaffung des Logischen Zufalls, WAZ, 8. Mai 1999
- Milan Chlumsky, Der unvollkommenen Welt manchmal böse. Heidelberg 1999
- Sabine Scheltwort, Das ist doch lächerlich! Katalog, Museum Ratingen, Ratingen 2001
- Milan Chlumsky, Sinn, Bedeutung und ästhetischer Gehalt in den Buchobjekten von Michael Bacht, Katalog, Heidelberg 2001
- Milan Chlumsky, Die Entstehung der Immaterialität, Heidelberg 2003
- Milan Chlumsky, Theatrum mundi – Jeux des cartes, Hd 2007
- Manfred Kästner, Theatrum mundi – Jeux des cartes, Einführung in die Ausstellung, Heidelberg 2007
