= San Claudio al Chienti =

Romanesque double church in the Marche, Italy

Coordinates: 43.28407°N 13.51676°E

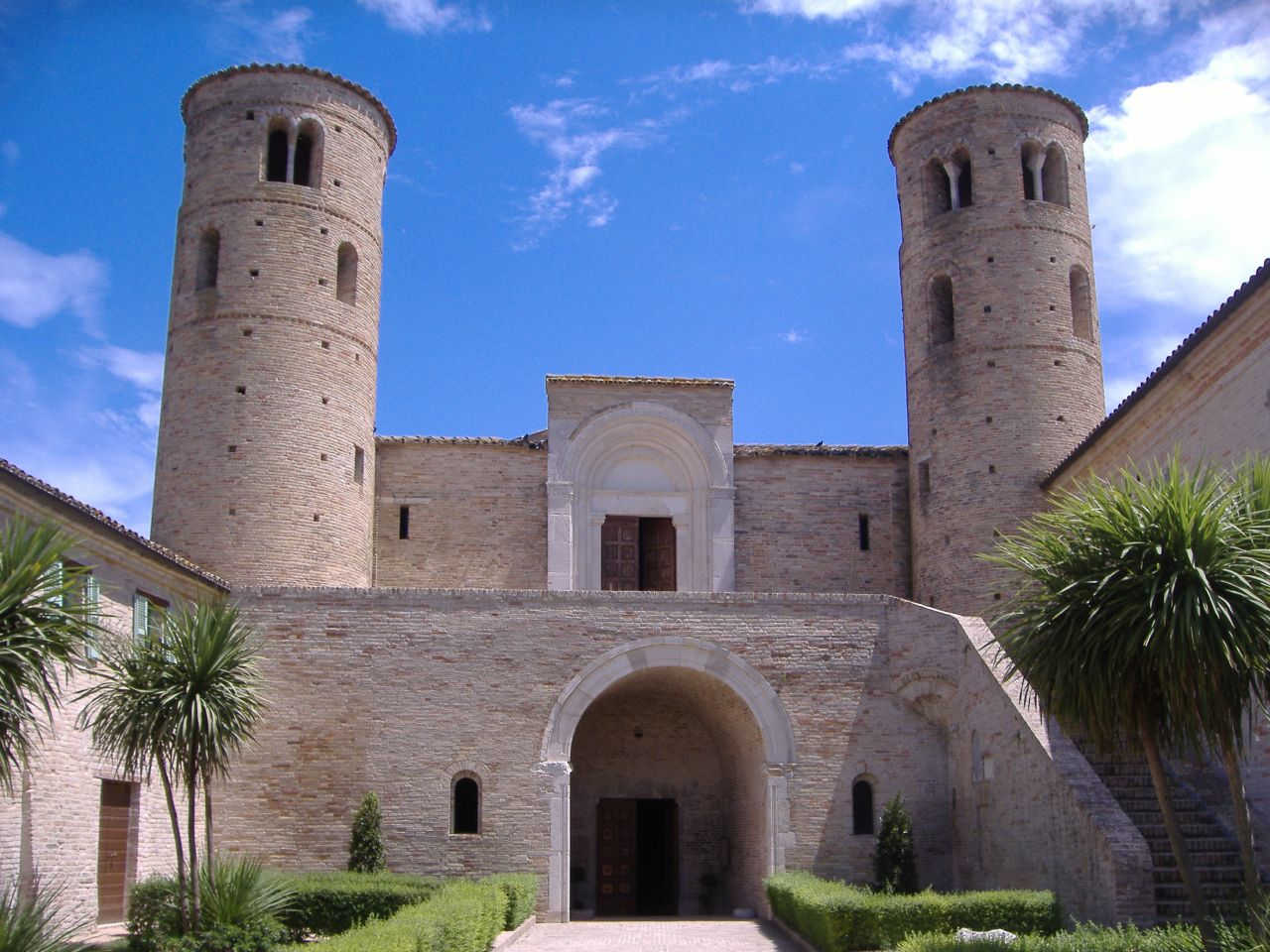
- The church seen from the south-west
- San Claudio al Chienti
- Location: Corridonia, Province of Macerata
- Country: Italy
- Denomination: Catholic

Architecture
- Architectural type: Church
- Style: Romanesque
- Years built: Early 11th century

Administration
- Archdiocese: Archdiocese of Fermo

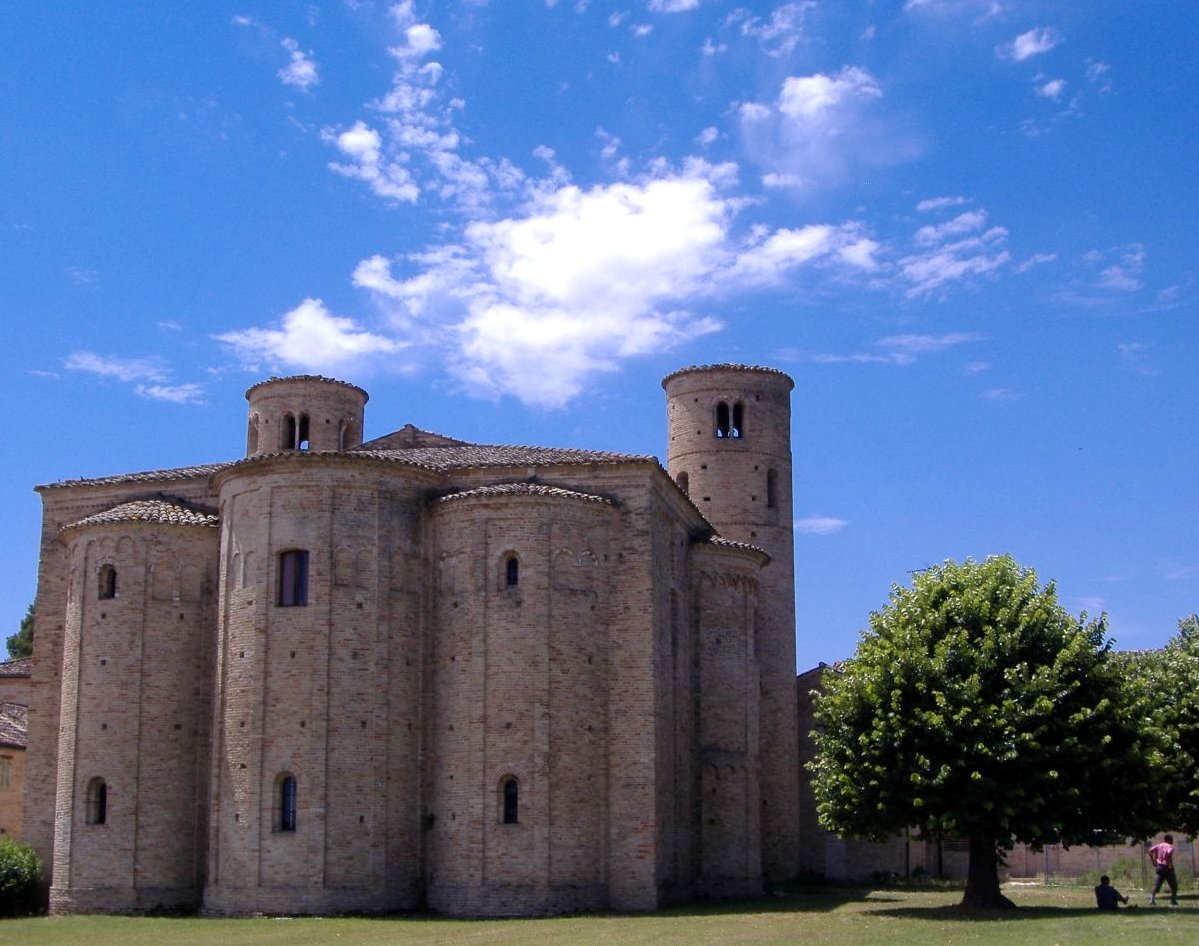
The east end, with its distinctive three-apse termination

San Claudio al Chienti is a Romanesque church in the territory of Corridonia, in the Marche region of central Italy, standing in the valley of the Chienti near the site of the Roman town of Pausulae. It is one of a small group of churches in the Marche built on a cross-in-square plan with four central supports, together with San Vittore alle Chiuse near Genga, Santa Croce dei Conti at Sassoferrato and Santa Maria delle Moje near Jesi.

The church is in fact double: two superimposed buildings sharing the same plan, one above the other — a type known in German scholarship as a Doppelkapelle. The lower church served the surrounding community as a pieve; the upper one was the private chapel of the bishop of Fermo, whose residence stood alongside. This twofold arrangement mirrors the social and religious hierarchy of the 11th century, in which the ambitions of the bishops of Fermo met the artistic currents linking the Marche to the rest of Europe. Despite its popular name of "abbey", no monastic community is documented on the site. The building was declared a national monument in 1902.

== Architecture ==
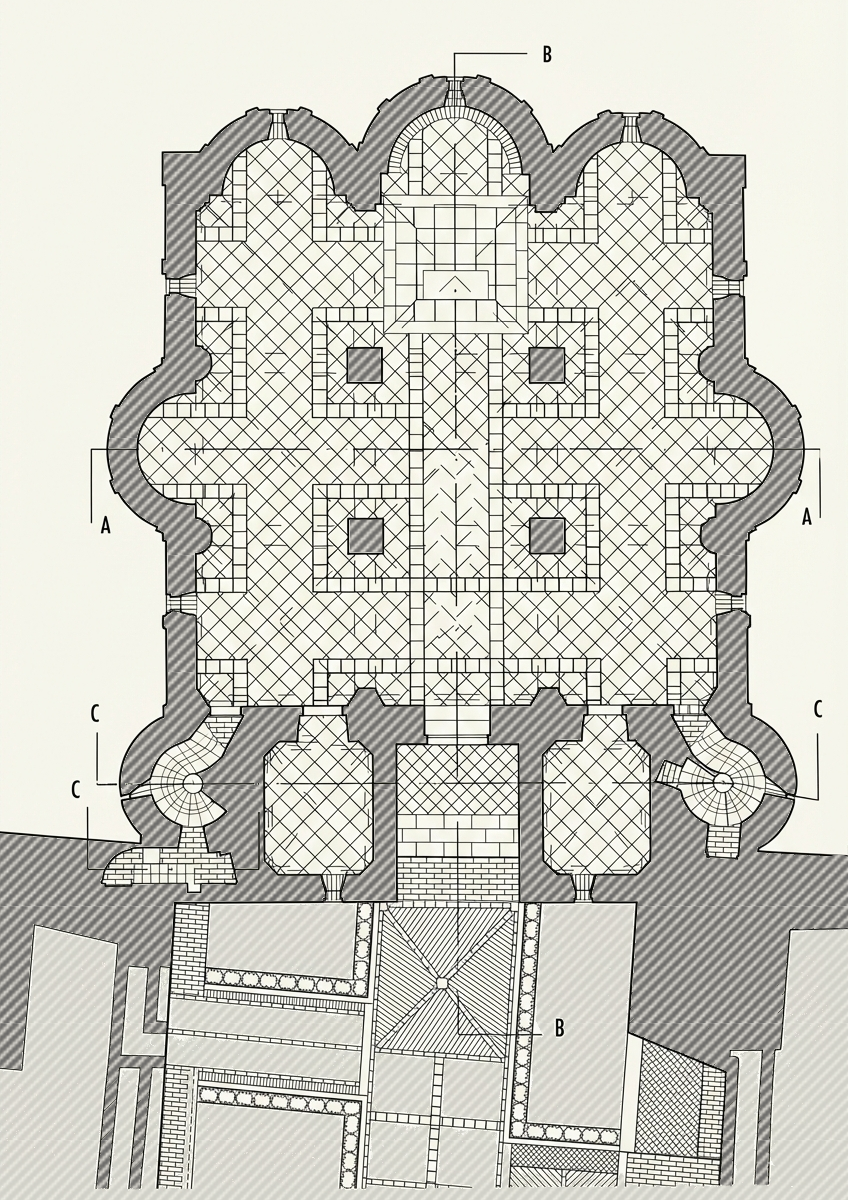
Plan of the building, showing the nine bays

=== Plan and exterior ===
The church has a cross-in-square plan of roughly 18 by 18 metres, divided by four cruciform piers into nine bays. Externally it reads as a compact cubic mass from which only the apses and the two towers project. Five semicircular apses open around the perimeter: three on the east side, the central one wider and taller, and one each to the north and south. This arrangement has no direct parallel in later Romanesque architecture, although it may be related to the triconch terminations of some northern churches.

The west front is flanked by two cylindrical stair towers about 16 metres high and 4.5 metres in diameter, built of brick with light stone inserts and pierced near the top by single- and two-light openings, partly the result of twentieth-century restoration. Inside they house spiral staircases linking the two levels. The façade between the towers has often been read as a free adaptation of the northern westwork. A low projecting body at ground level contains the portal of the lower church; above it a terrace, reached by an external stair, gives access to the upper church through a thirteenth-century portal in Istrian stone with foliate carving.

The apses and lateral elevations are articulated with Lombard bands and pilaster strips in the manner of the Lombard Romanesque, with dog-tooth friezes and alternating light and dark voussoirs over the windows.

=== The two churches ===
The lower church stands entirely above ground and is therefore not a crypt. Its nine bays are covered by groin vaults, giving a low, enclosed interior. The upper church is vaulted differently: the three bays of the central aisle carry slightly stilted barrel vaults, while the six lateral bays have groin vaults. It is bare of decoration.

The functional division between the two levels is the key to the building. According to Hildegard Sahler, the bishop reserved the upper church for himself, while the lower one continued the tradition of the Early Christian pieve open to the community.

=== Frescoes ===
The central apse of the lower church retains two frescoes of the second half of the fifteenth century, depicting Saint Roch and Saint Claudius. The pairing reflects a devotional logic: Claudius as protector of the local craft community, Roch as intercessor against the plague epidemics that struck the Marche in that period.

== Architectural context and scholarship ==
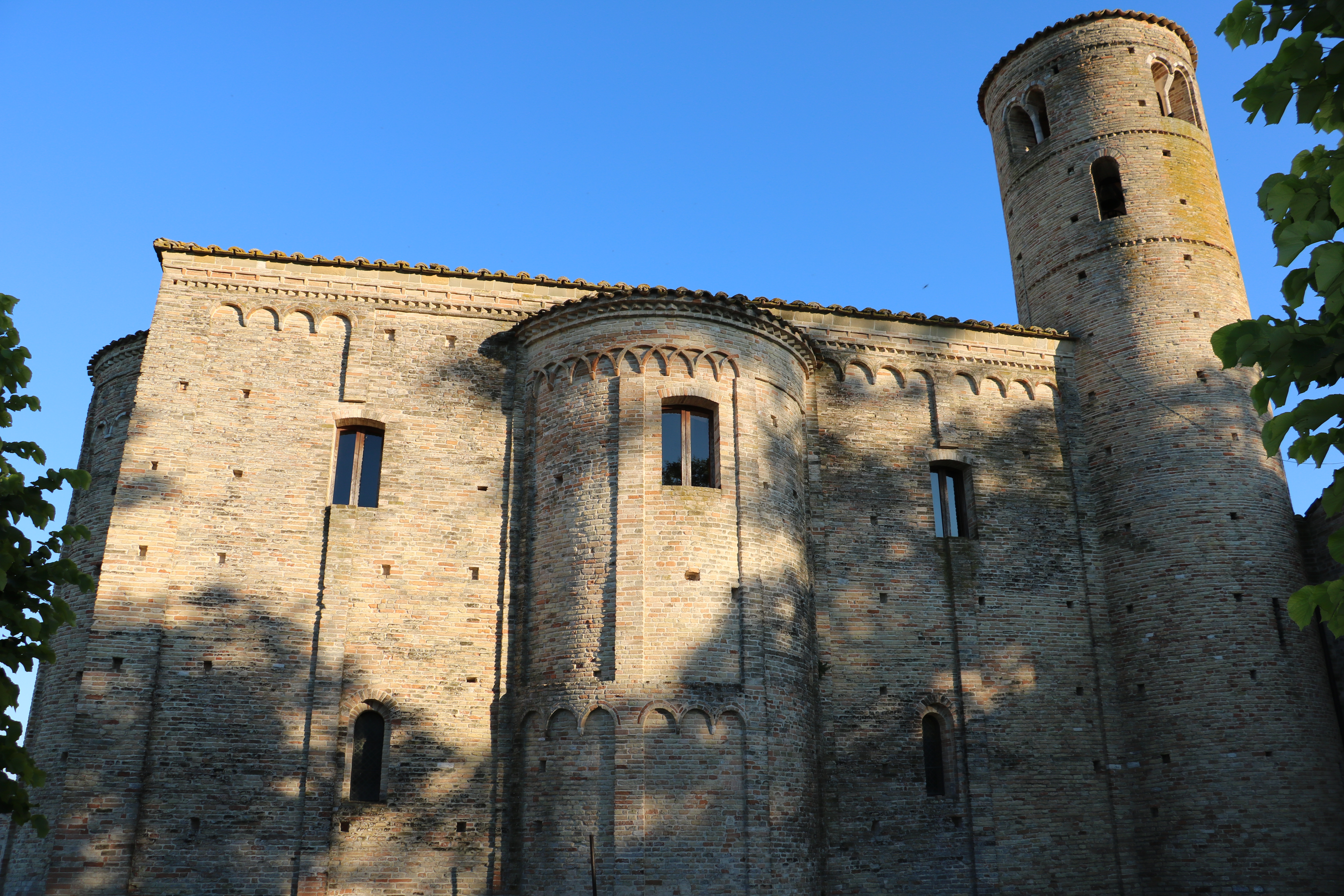
The south flank, with the blind arcading characteristic of the Lombard Romanesque

The building has been read in two divergent ways.

Traditional scholarship stressed its eastern connections. Giulio Carlo Argan pointed to a Byzantine derivation for the centralised cross-in-square plan, a Ravennate one for the cylindrical towers and a Lombard one for the surface decoration. Claudia Barsanti saw in the Marche group "a westernised reflection of Greek-Byzantine models", comparing the two towers of San Claudio with tenth- and eleventh-century towers at Ravenna, including that of the basilica of Sant'Apollinare in Classe, with which the church of Fermo had significant links.

Sahler's monograph of 1998, the only book-length study of the building, argues the opposite. In her view the typological models for the two-storey chapel are to be found not in the Byzantine world but only in Italy; San Claudio combines a triconch plan, a four-support square and a double chapel into a new building type able to serve at once as a pieve and as a palace chapel, and it is the Marche building that sends echoes northwards rather than the reverse. A monographic treatment of San Claudio as a Doppelkapelle had already been offered by Wolfgang Krönig.

The two-storey chapel type itself is defined in German art history as a building containing two superimposed places of worship, each with its own altar and liturgical autonomy; Günter Bandmann included San Claudio among the paradigmatic examples, alongside the Archiepiscopal Chapel in Ravenna and the palace chapels of Goslar and Schwarzrheindorf. The Ravenna chapel, built around 500 on the first floor of the bishop's palace, is the only Early Christian private oratory to survive intact and is the closest functional precedent for the upper church at San Claudio.

== History ==
=== Pausulae ===
The church stands in the territory of the Roman town of Pausulae, listed by Pliny the Elder in the Natural History (III, 111) among the towns of the fifth Augustan region. Its site, proposed in the eighteenth century on the strength of the survival of the place name in medieval documents, was established in 1981 by the field surveys of Umberto Moscatelli, which place it immediately east of San Claudio. A bishop Claudius episcopus Pasulanus is recorded at the Roman synod of 465. The town disappeared in the course of the sixth century, hard hit by the Gothic War and perhaps also by the great flood of 589.

=== Foundation and the eleventh-century church ===
The dedication is to Claudius, a Pannonian martyr of the time of Diocletian and one of the Four Crowned Martyrs, patrons of stonemasons and sculptors; his cult made him the oldest patron saint of Fermo.

The present building was erected in the early eleventh century. On the basis of stylistic and constructional comparisons Sahler places the work between 1010 and 1040 and identifies as probable patron Bishop Ubertus, son of Count Theobald, who transferred the power and wealth of his family to his church; it was built as an episcopal proprietary church of some magnificence, together with the bishop's residence. Spolia from ancient Pausulae were reused in the fabric.

The church is first documented in 1089 as the Fermo ministerium de Sancto Claudio; its character as a pieve is made explicit in 1176. San Claudio held a role and a patrimony well above those of all the other pievi of the diocese.

=== Later history ===
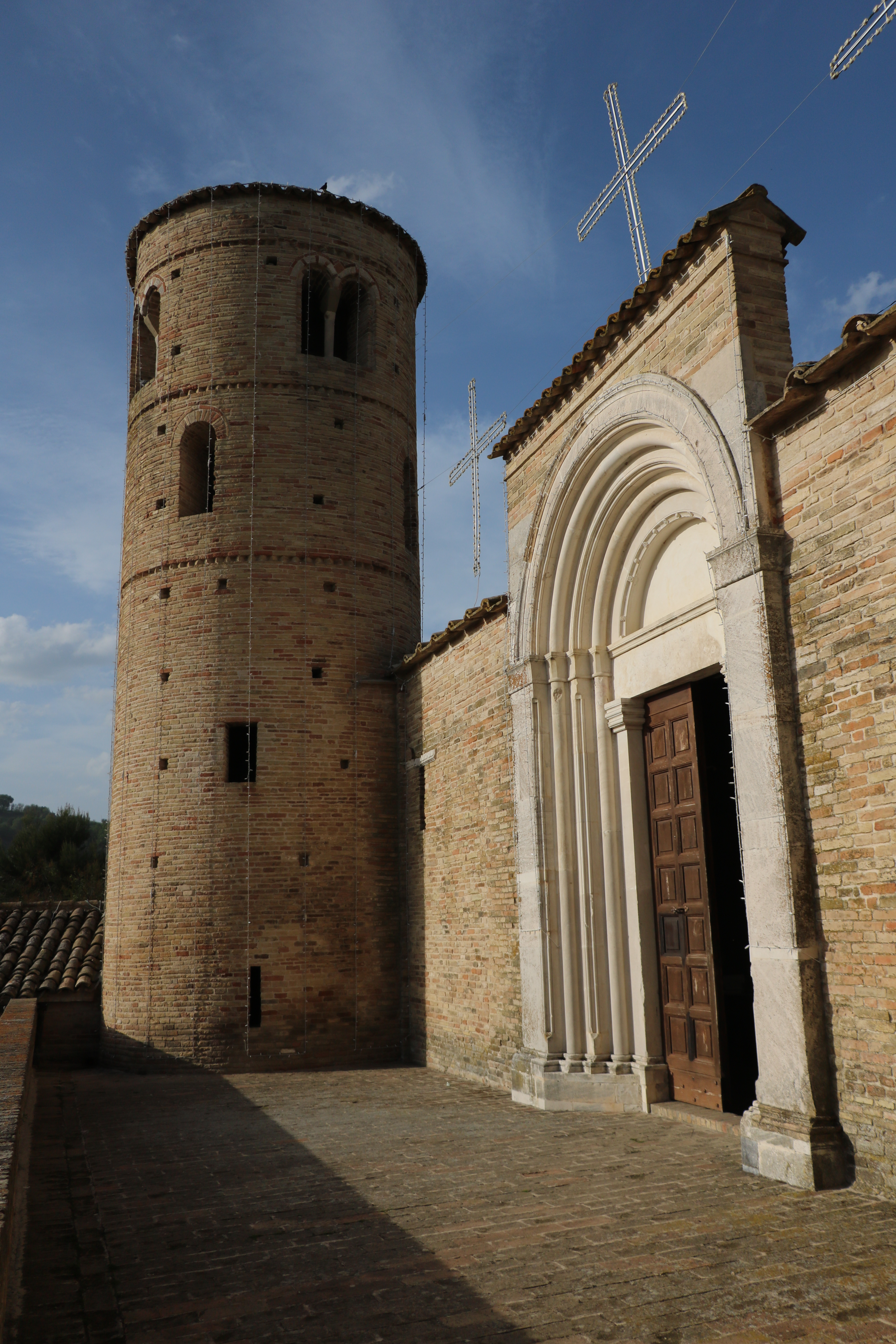
The Gothic portal of the upper church and one of the cylindrical towers

In 1212 a raid from Macerata damaged the cylindrical towers. In 1254 the episcopal palace attached to the church is first mentioned as the palatium ejusdem ecclesiae, and in 1258 the camera domini episcopi, where the sale of a plot of land took place; both confirm that San Claudio belonged juridically to the see of Fermo. In the thirteenth century the external stair with its gallery and the Gothic portal were added and part of the tower masonry was rebuilt.

The name "abbey" was applied only from the eighteenth century, on account of the size of the building and of the large agricultural estate around it. The church was declared a national monument in 1902. In 1925–1926 the archbishop of Fermo, Carlo Castelli, commissioned a complete restoration directed by the architect Luigi Serra, which affected the walls and roofs and partly rebuilt the cylindrical towers. The church is still consecrated and open to visitors.

== The Carolingian claim ==
Since the 1990s the church has also been the subject of a pseudohistorical claim identifying it with Charlemagne's palace chapel at Aachen, a thesis regarded as untenable by specialists.

From the 1990s the independent scholar Giovanni Carnevale, a Salesian priest, developed a reconstruction according to which San Claudio was the true palace chapel of Aachen and the seat of Charlemagne's court, and the Carolingian capital lay in the Chienti valley. Each of the theory's supporting arguments has been shown to be unfounded. The building is dated to the eleventh century on stylistic grounds, two centuries after the Carolingian period, and includes solutions characteristic of the late eleventh-century Lombard Romanesque; no supporting archaeological evidence exists. The charter adduced in support of a Carolingian palatium in the Fermo area (Duke Hildeprand of Spoleto's confirmation to Farfa of 787) contains no reference to the Chienti valley, and the palatium named in it is the ducal palace at Spoleto.

The theory nonetheless attracted wide media attention, including an article in The Economist in 2023. In July 2024 a petition signed by more than 200 people, among them 62 university teachers and the historian Alessandro Barbero, asked for the removal from the church of popular material presenting the thesis; the archbishop of Fermo had it removed two months later.

== See also ==
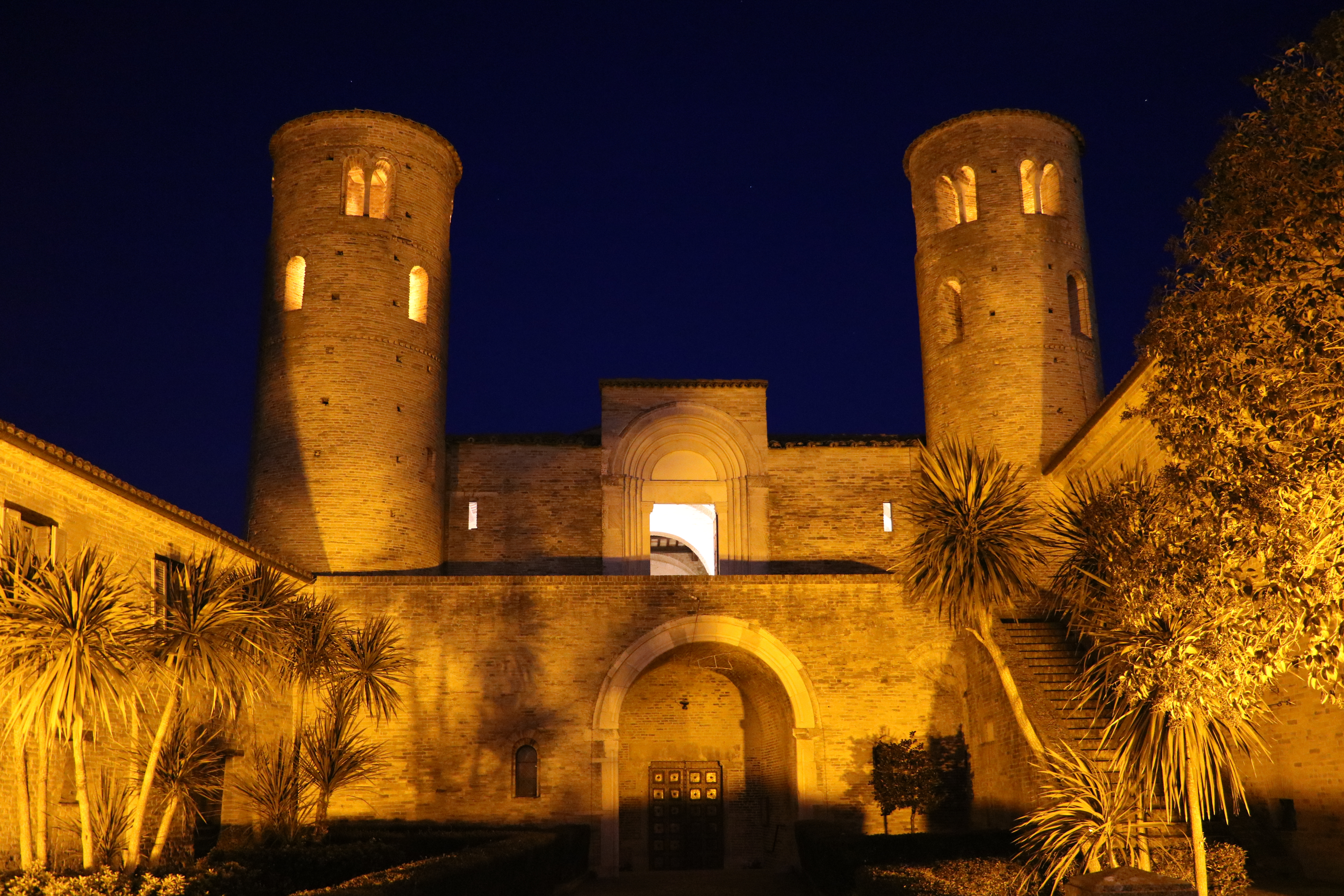
Night view

- San Vittore alle Chiuse
- Double chapel
- Cross-in-square

== Bibliography ==
- Bandmann, Günter (1955). "Doppelkapelle, -kirche". Reallexikon zur Deutschen Kunstgeschichte (in German). IV: 196–215.
- Argan, Giulio Carlo (1993). L'architettura protocristiana, preromanica e romanica (in Italian). Bari: Dedalo. ISBN 978-88-220-3313-0.
- Barsanti, Claudia (1992). "Riflessi bizantini nell'architettura monastica delle Marche". In Simi Varanelli, Emma (ed.). Le abbazie delle Marche. Storia e arte (in Italian). Rome: Viella. pp. 377–396. ISBN 978-88-85669-23-9.
- Cappelli, Furio (2023). "Una pieve in Val di Chienti tra storia, metastoria e magia". Studi Maceratesi (in Italian). 57: 11–33.
- Hartmann, Florian (2024). "Le Marche imperiali: una questione di metodo". Studi Maceratesi (in Italian). 58: 9–26.
- Hubert, Jean (1931). "Germigny-des-Prés". Congrès archéologique de France (in French). 93 (Session held at Orléans in 1930): 533–568.
- ICOMOS (1996). "Advisory Body Evaluation. Ravenna (Italy), No 788" (PDF). UNESCO World Heritage Centre.
- Krönig, Wolfgang (1988). "San Claudio al Chienti. Eine romanische Doppelkapelle in den Marken". In Much, Franz J. (ed.). Baukunst des Mittelalters in Europa. Hans Erich Kubach zum 75. Geburtstag (in German). Stuttgart: Konrad Theiss. pp. 437–444.
- Piva, Paolo (2012). Cerioni, Cristiano (ed.). Il romanico nelle Marche (in Italian). Milan: Jaca Book. ISBN 978-88-16-60487-2.
- Sahler, Hildegard (1998). San Claudio al Chienti und die romanischen Kirchen des Vierstützentyps in den Marken. Beiträge zur Kunstgeschichte des Mittelalters und der Renaissance (in German). Vol. 6. Münster: Rhema. ISBN 978-3-930454-07-5.
- Sahler, Hildegard (2006). Cappelli, Furio (ed.). San Claudio al Chienti e le chiese romaniche a croce greca iscritta nelle Marche (in Italian). Ascoli Piceno: Lamusa. ISBN 978-88-88972-17-6.
- Staffa, Andrea Rosario (2025). "Ai confini settentrionali di Fermo bizantina: la bassa val di Chienti in età altomedievale". Il capitale culturale. Studies on the Value of Cultural Heritage (in Italian) (supplement 18): 107–151. doi:10.13138/2039-2362/3727.
