= Remscheid =

- City
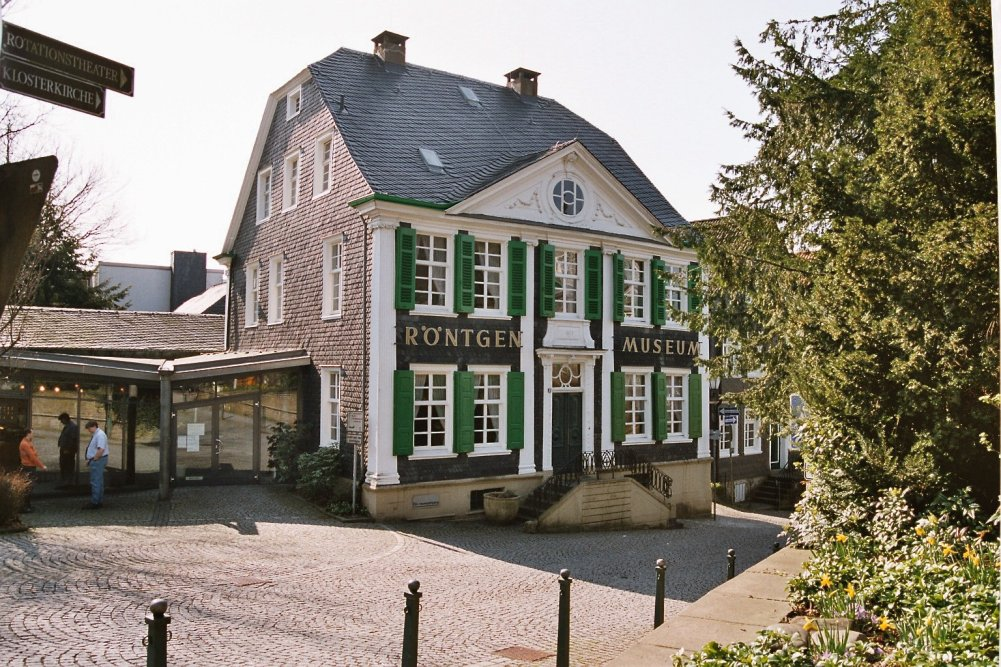
- German Röntgen Museum

- Flag Coat of arms
- Interactive map of Remscheid
- Location within Germany Location within North Rhine-Westphalia
- Coordinates: 51°11′N 07°12′E
- Country: Germany
- State: North Rhine-Westphalia
- Admin. region: Düsseldorf
- District: Urban district

Government
  - Mayor (2025–30): Sven Wolf (SPD)

Area
  - Total: 74.6 km^{2} (28.8 sq mi)
- Elevation: 365 m (1,198 ft)

Population (2025-12-31)
  - Total: 113,333
  - Density: 1,520/km^{2} (3,930/sq mi)
- Time zone: UTC+01:00 (CET)
  - Summer (DST): UTC+02:00 (CEST)
- Postal codes: 42801–42899
- Dialling codes: 02191
- Vehicle registration: RS
- Website: www.remscheid.de

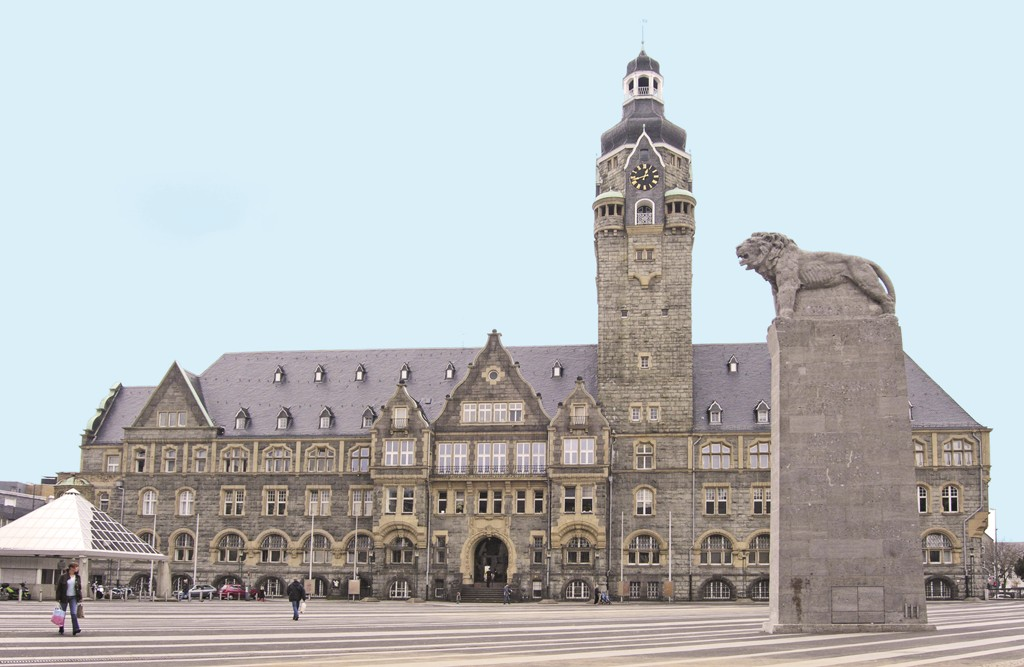
City Hall

Remscheid (German: [ˈʁɛmʃaɪt]) is a city in North Rhine-Westphalia, Germany. It is, after Wuppertal and Solingen, the third-largest municipality in Bergisches Land, being located on the northern edge of the region, on the south side of the Ruhr area.

Remscheid had 113,333 inhabitants at the end of 2025. A variety of the Limburgish language, known locally as Remscheder Platt is spoken in the city through all generations.

== Geography ==
Remscheid comprises four boroughs, Alt-Remscheid, Remscheid-Süd, Lennep, and Lüttringhausen.

Its highest point is the Brodtberg (378 m).

== History ==
Remscheid was founded in the 12th century, but remained a small village until the 19th century. Early spellings for the city included Remissgeid (1217), Rymscheyd (1351), Reymscheyd (1487) and Rembscheid (1639). The economic growth of the entire Rhine-Ruhr region led to an increase of the population of Remscheid. Mechanical engineering and toolmaking were the main industries practised within the town. This is carried on today with the Hazet tool company which has three factories in Remscheid. Remscheid was part of the Prussian Rhine Province from 1822 to 1945.

On 31 July 1943, during World War II, Remscheid was almost completely destroyed during a British bombing raid which caused a firestorm. This bombing raid was the final operation of RAF's Battle of the Ruhr involving 273 aircraft. Today around one third of the city consists of buildings from before World War II. During 14 and 15 April 1945, Remscheid was captured by the 78th Infantry Division (United States).

An A-10 Thunderbolt II crashed in the city on 8 December 1988. Six people died.

== Demographics ==
Historical population

Year	Pop.	±% p.a.
1965	134,218	—
1970	138,328	+0.61%
1975	133,148	−0.76%
1980	129,086	−0.62%
1985	121,219	−1.25%
1990	123,155	+0.32%
1995	122,260	−0.15%

Year	Pop.	±% p.a.
2000	119,287	−0.49%
2005	115,864	−0.58%
2010	110,563	−0.93%
2015	109,499	−0.19%
2020	111,516	+0.37%
2025	113,333	+0.32%

Population size may be affected by changes in administrative divisions. Source: Landesdatabank Nordrhein-Westfalen

As of 31 December 2019, the city's population was 113,703, of which 92,726 (81.6%) were German citizens and 20,977 (18.4%) were non-Germans (Ausländer); of the non-German population, the top 10 nationalities represented were as follows:

Rank	Nationality	Population (31.12.2019)
1	Turkey	5,749
2	Italy	3,158
3	Syria	1,264
4	Poland	1,187
5	Bulgaria	1,039
6	Spain	866
7	North Macedonia	748
8	Croatia	646
9	Serbia	583
10	Portugal	493

== Politics ==
=== Mayor ===
The current mayor of Remscheid is Sven Wolf of the Social Democratic Party (SPD), elected in 2025.

The previous mayoral election was held on 13 September 2020, and the results were as follows:

Candidate	Party	Votes	%
Burkhard Mast-Weisz	Social Democratic Party	22,431	60.6
Heidemarie Alexa Bell	Christian Democratic Union	9,710	26.2
Peter Keck	Pro Remscheid	1,908	5.2
Fritz Beinersdorf	The Left	1,309	3.5
Roland Kirchner	W.i.R. Remscheid	877	2.4
Bettina Stamm	Real Remscheid	775	2.1
Valid votes		37,010	98.5
Invalid votes		548	1.5
Total		37,558	100.0
Electorate/voter turnout		85,783	43.8
Source: State Returning Officer

=== City council ===
Results of the 2020 city council election

The Remscheid city council governs the city alongside the mayor. The most recent city council election was held on 13 September 2020, and the results were as follows:

Party	Votes	%	+/−	Seats	+/−
Social Democratic Party (SPD)	12,718	34.5	▼0.3	20	▼1
Christian Democratic Union (CDU)	11,036	29.9	▼7.3	17	▼3
Alliance 90/The Greens (Grüne)	5,409	14.7	▲6.3	9	▲5
Free Democratic Party (FDP)	1,945	5.3	▲0.6	3	▲1
Pro Remscheid (PRO)	1,870	5.1	▲0.7	3	▲1
The Left (Die Linke)	1,700	4.6	▼1.4	3	±0
W.i.R. Remscheid (WIR)	1,092	3.0	▼1.5	2	±0
Real Remscheid (Echt)	788	2.1	New	1	New
Alternative for Germany (AfD)	358	1.0	New	0	New
Valid votes	36,916	98.4			
Invalid votes	592	1.6			
Total	37,508	100.0		58	▲6
Electorate/voter turnout	85,783	43.7	▲0.7		
Source: State Returning Officer

== Main sights ==
- The Müngstener Brücke is a railway bridge crossing a valley and connecting Remscheid with the neighbouring town of Solingen. It is 107 m above the ground, making it the highest railway bridge in Germany. It was constructed in 1897 and originally named the Kaiser-Wilhelm-Brücke after Wilhelm I (whose 100th birthday would have been in 1897).
- The Eschbachtalsperre, the first dam built in Germany for the supply of drinking water is located here. It was built in 1891.
- The old city of the borough Lennep consists of 116 houses from 1756.

== Twin towns – sister cities ==
Remscheid is twinned with:

- Ashington, England, United Kingdom
- Kırşehir, Turkey
- Newbiggin by the Sea, England, United Kingdom
- Pirna, Germany
- Prešov, Slovakia
- Quimper, France

Remscheid also cooperates with Mrągowo County, Poland and Schmalkalden, Germany.

== Notable people ==
- Caspar Georg Carl Reinwardt (1773–1854), scientist
- Gottfried Duden (1789–1856), writer
- Ewald Over (1835-1912), entrepreneur and veteran
- Oscar Schlitter (1838–1939), banker
- Johannes Fastenrath (1839–1908), lawyer, writer and translator
- August Gissler (1857–1935), adventurer and treasure hunter
- Wilhelm Röntgen (1845–1923), discoverer of x-rays
- Walter Freitag (1889–1958), trade union leader and politician
- Otto Jungtow (1892–1959), footballer
- Otto Kuhler (1894–1977), American designer of locomotives
- Hans Stammreich (1902–1969), German-Brazilian chemist
- Teo Otto (1904–1968), stage designer
- Wolfgang von der Nahmer (1906–1988), conductor
- Gustav Adolf Theill (1924–1997), composer and musicologist
- Karl Michael Vogler (1928–2009), actor
- Wolfgang Seiler (born 1940), biogeochemist and climatologist
- Peter Brötzmann (1941–2023), free jazz saxophonist
- Christel Frese (born 1944), athlete
- Michael Bacht (born 1947), artist
- Frank Plasberg (born 1957), journalist
- Lutz Huelle (born 1966), fashion designer
- Wolfgang Tillmans (born 1968), photographer
- Georg Wurth (born 1972), lobbyist and activist
- Christiane Soeder (born 1975), German-Austrian cyclist
- Robert A. Küfner (born 1988), entrepreneur, raised here
- The Rotation (born 1996), professional wrestler

== Gallery ==
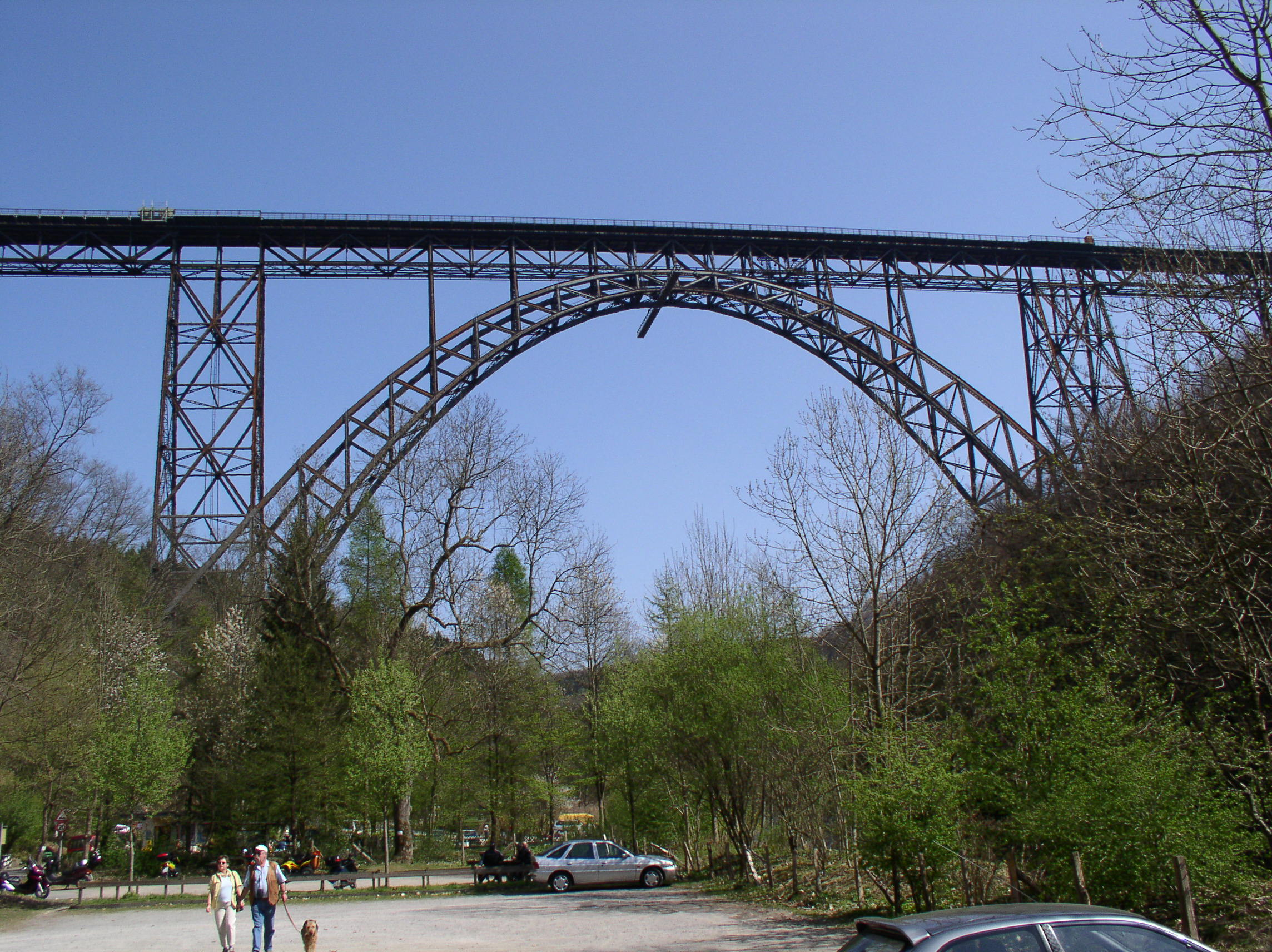
Müngsten Bridge

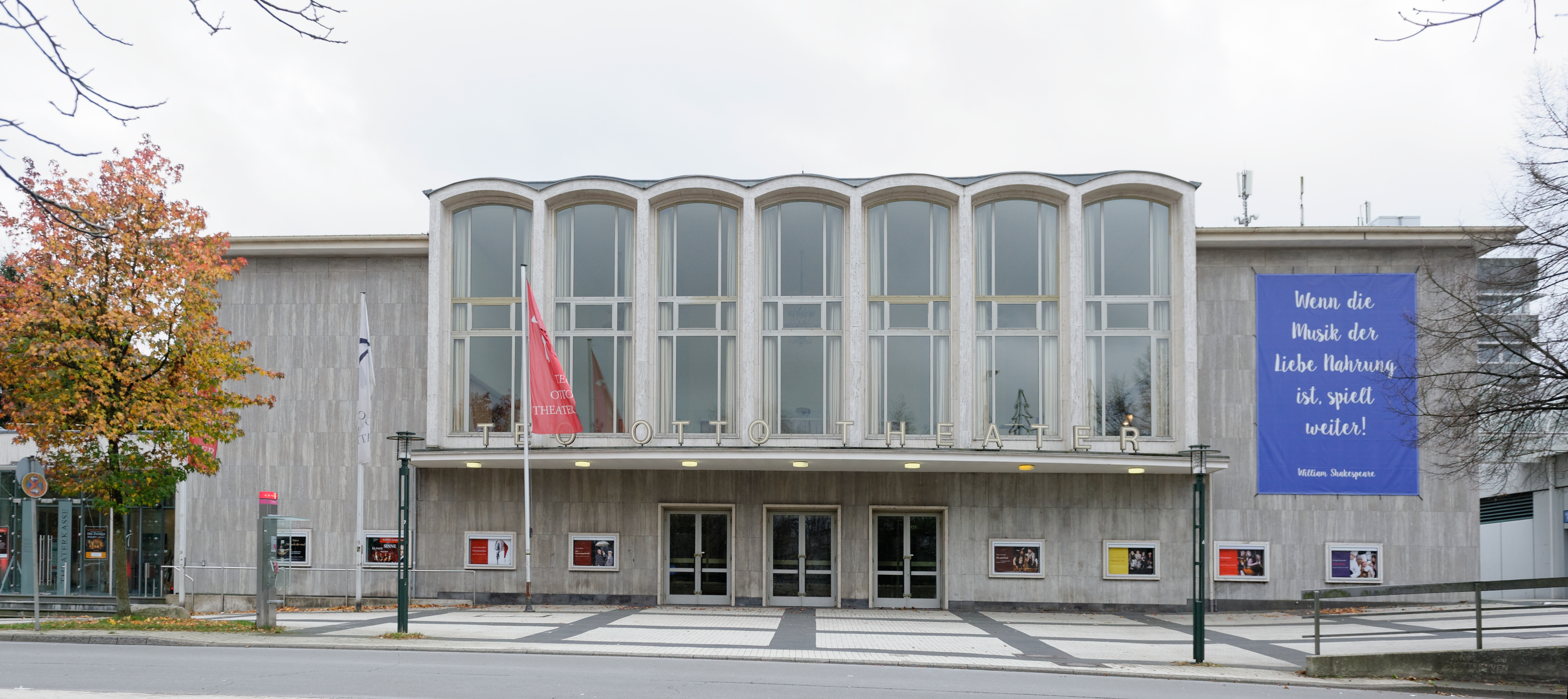
Teo Otto Theater

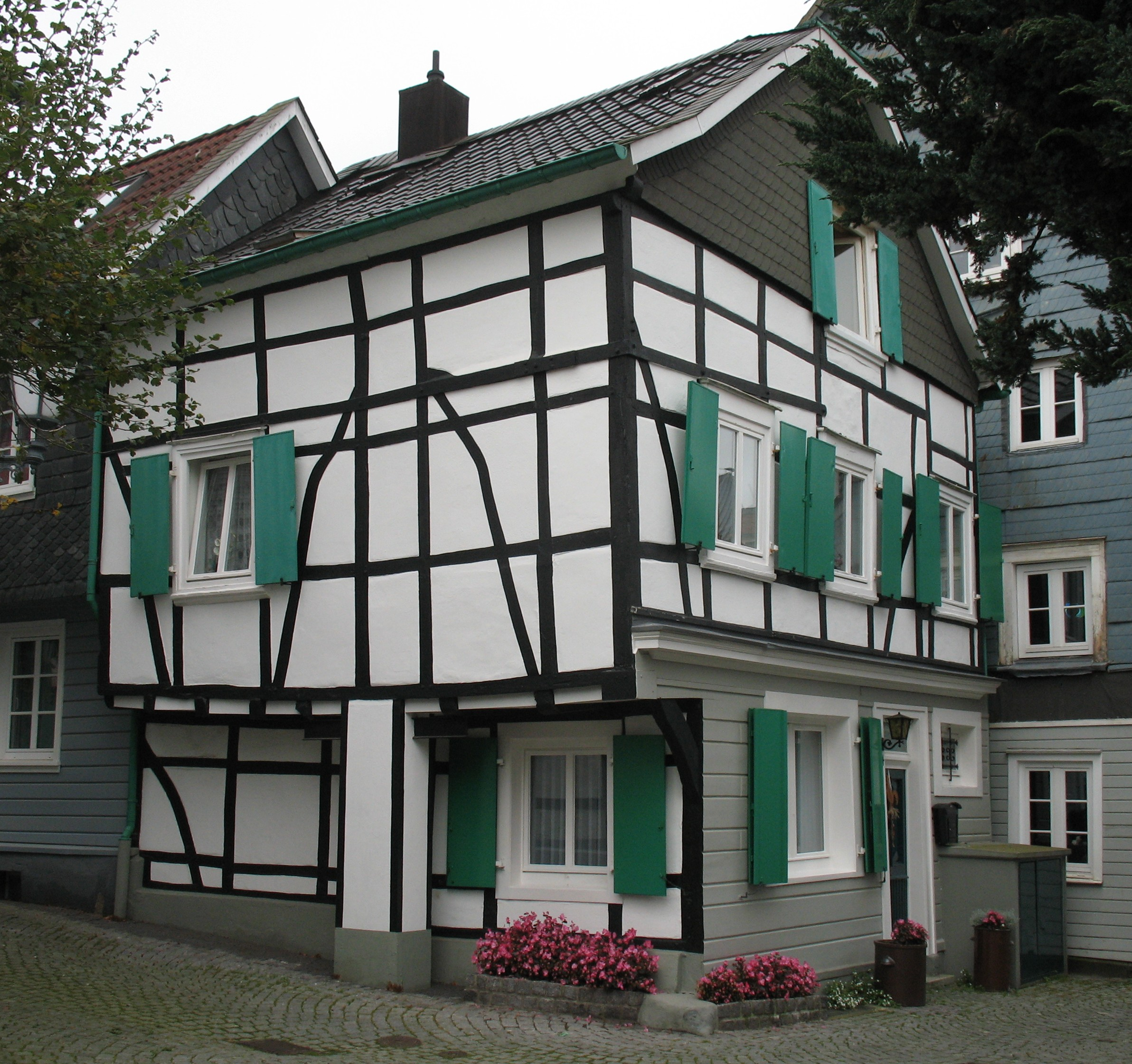
Kraspütt 3 in Lennep

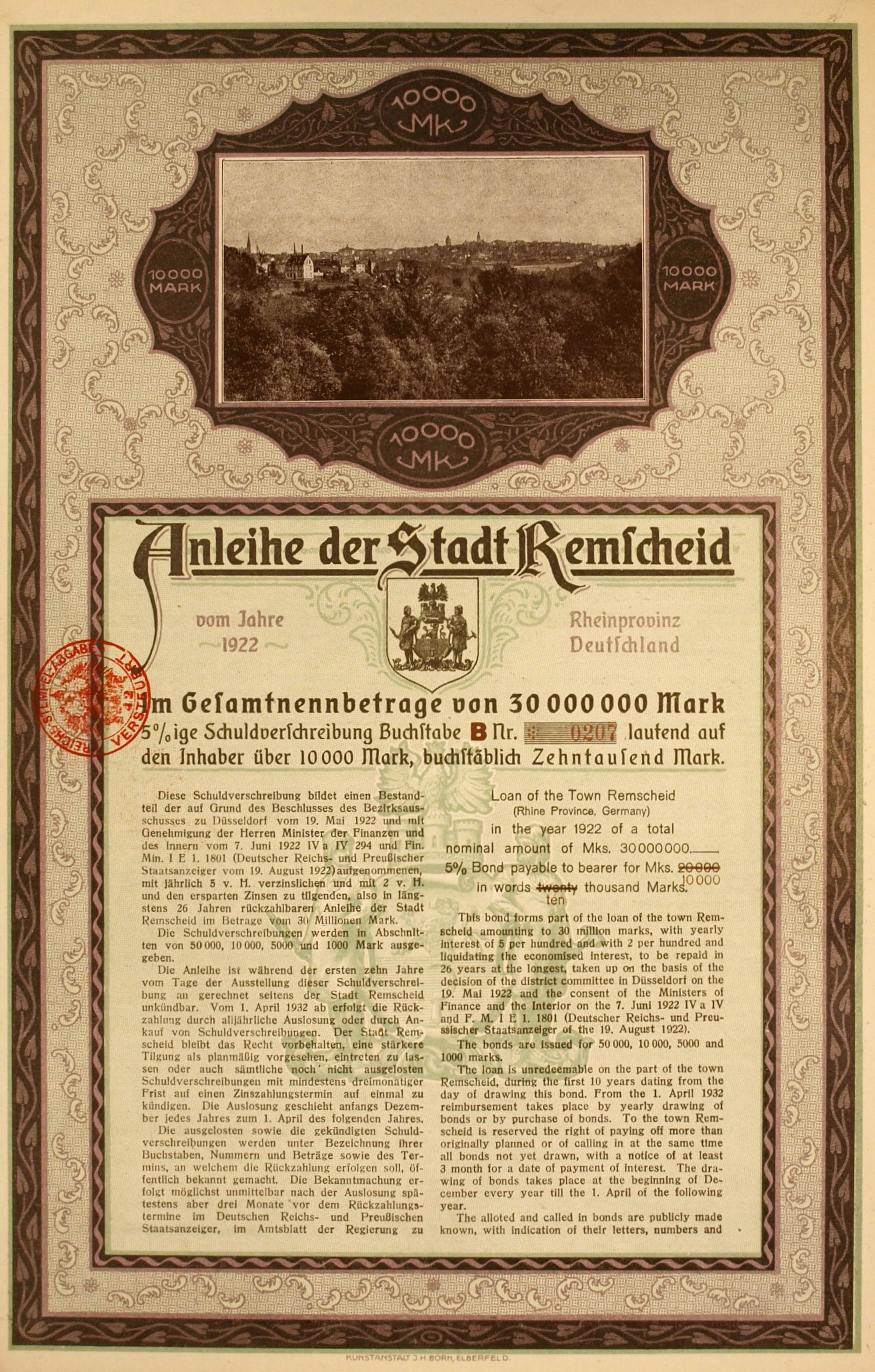
Bond of the town Remscheid, issued 25 August 1922
