= Capracotta =

- Comune
- Comune di Capracotta
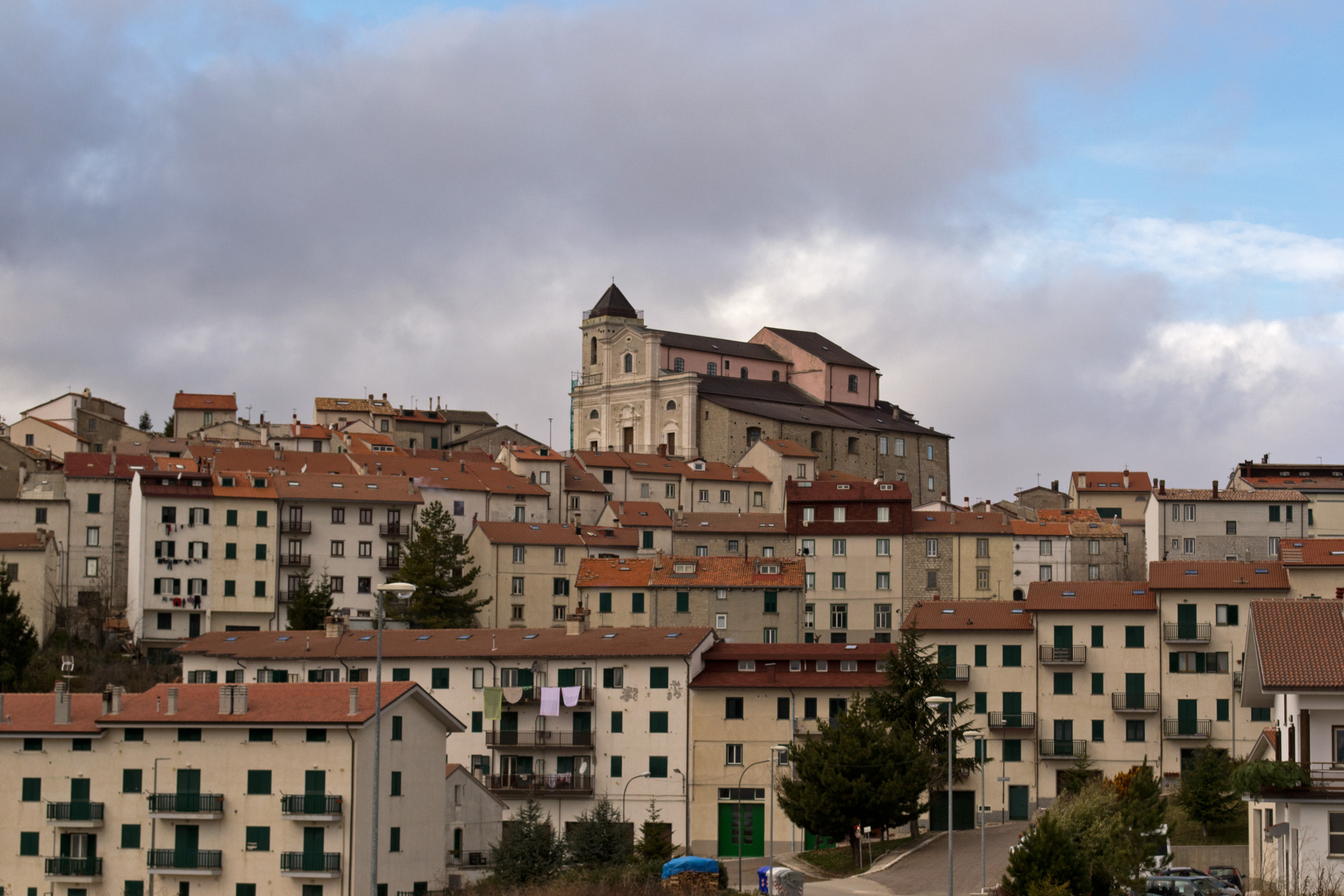
- View of Capracotta

- Location within Italy Location within Molise
- Coordinates: 41°50′N 14°16′E
- Country: Italy
- Region: Molise
- Province: Isernia (IS)

Government
  - Mayor: Candido Paglione

Area
  - Total: 42.55 km^{2} (16.43 sq mi)
- Elevation: 1,421 m (4,662 ft)

Population (30 November 2017)
  - Total: 871
  - Density: 20.5/km^{2} (53.0/sq mi)
- Demonym: Capracottesi
- Time zone: UTC+1 (CET)
  - Summer (DST): UTC+2 (CEST)
- Postal code: 86082
- Dialing code: 0865
- Website: Official website

Capracotta is a comune (municipality) in the Province of Isernia in the Italian region of Molise, located about 45 kilometres (28 mi) northwest of Campobasso and about 25 kilometres (16 mi) north of Isernia.

It is the second highest municipality near the center of Italy at 1,421 metres (4,662 ft) above sea level, and 41st in Italy.

On March 5, 2015, some 2.56 metres (101 in) of snow fell in 24 hours in the hamlet, setting a new world record recognized by Guinness World Records.

Capracotta borders the municipalities of Agnone, Castel del Giudice, Pescopennataro, San Pietro Avellana, Sant'Angelo del Pesco, and Vastogirardi.

== Main sights ==
- Giardino di Flora Appenninica

== Notable people ==
- Giovanni Carnevale (1924–2021), Italian priest, writer and historian
