= Sven Wolf =

German politician (born 1976)

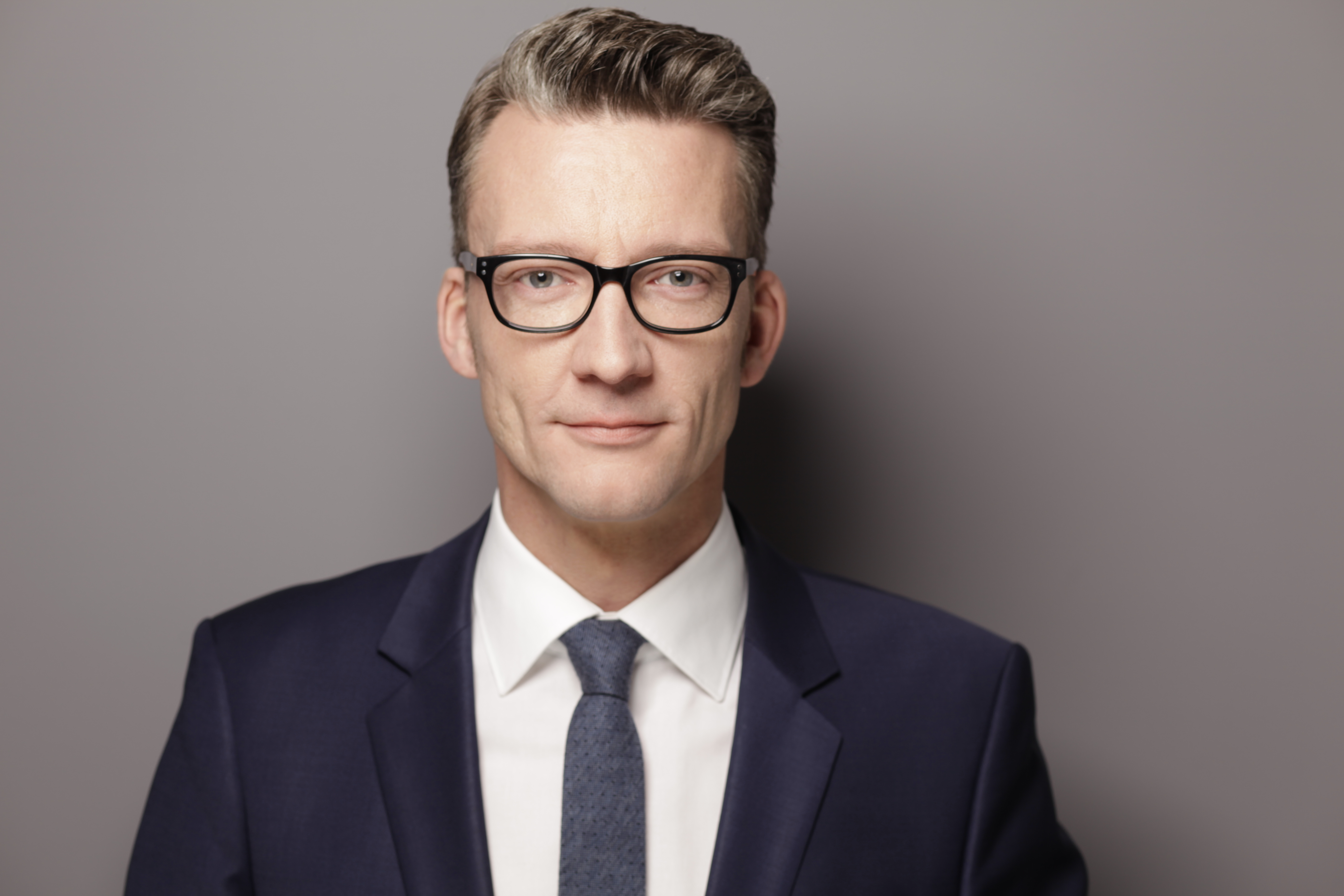
- Wolf in 2016

Member of the Landtag of North Rhine-Westphalia
- In office 9 June 2010 – 4 November 2025
- Preceded by: Elke Rühl
- Succeeded by: Andrea Reh
- Constituency: Remscheid (2010–2017)

Personal details
- Born: 10 February 1976 (age 50) Remscheid
- Party: Social Democratic Party (since 1998)

Sven Wolf (born 10 February 1976 in Remscheid) is a German politician serving as mayor of Remscheid since 2025. From 2010 to 2025, he was a member of the Landtag of North Rhine-Westphalia.
