= San Vittore alle Chiuse =

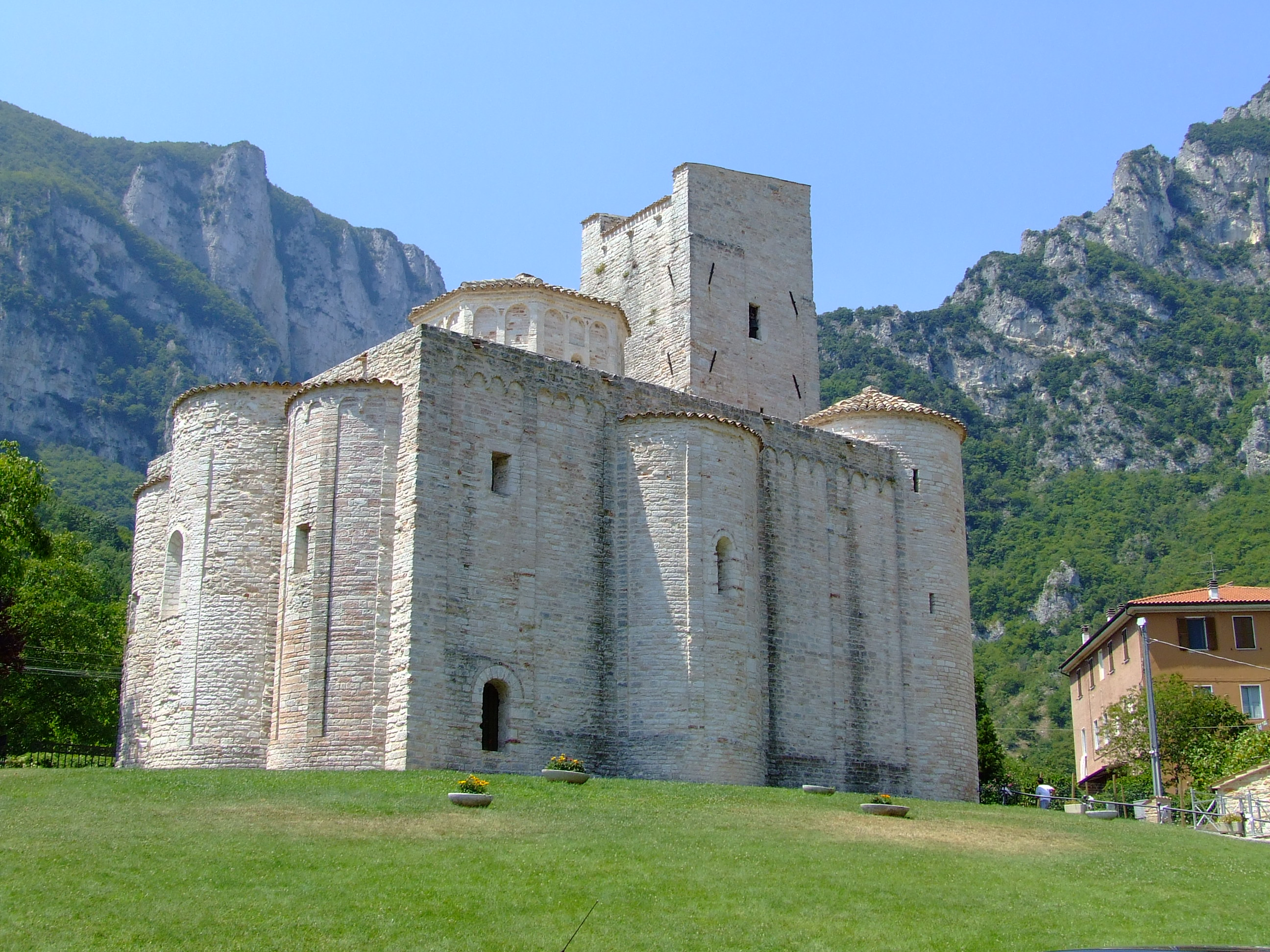
- San Vittore alle Chiuse
- 43°24′8.15″N 12°58′14.18″E
- Location: Genga
- Country: Italy
- Denomination: Roman Catholic

History
- Founded: 1011

Architecture
- Style: Byzantine/Armenian

San Vittore alle Chiuse is a Roman Catholic abbey and church in the comune of Genga, Marche, Italy. The edifice is known from the year 1011, and constitutes a notable example of Byzantine-influenced architecture in Italy.

== Description ==
The rear area is characterized by three high apses, the central only slightly larger. Only the northern one has maintained the original decoration with pilaster strips and small arches.

On the western side is the cylindrical tower which replaced the second square tower, crumbled in an unknown date. On the same side a forepart was added in the 13th-14th centuries with an ogival entrance.

The tambour, which protrudes from the centre of the construction, has some similitaries with Armenian-Byzantine architecture.

The interior is on the Greek cross-in-square plan, with four columns, decorated with brick elements, supporting the dome.

San Vittore alle Chiuse Abbey — together with others such as Santa Maria delle Moie Abbey and the church of Santa Croce di Sassoferrato — part of an architectural typology of extra-urban Romanic churches with a central plan in the Marche region built between 1070 and 1110, that recognizes San Claudio al Chienti as its prototype. The scholar of architectural history Paolo Favole defined these buildings as "deutero-Byzantine with a Greek cross inscribed in a square".

== See also ==
- High medieval domes
