= Robert A. Küfner =

German entrepreneur, author and investor (born 1988)

- Born: 15 May 1988 (age 38); Wuppertal
- Education: Fresenius University Cologne
- Occupation: Entrepreneur

Robert A. Küfner (15 May 1988) is a German entrepreneur, author and investor. He is mentioned as a pioneer in the field of Bitcoin and blockchain technology.

== Early life ==
Küfner was born in Wuppertal and raised in Remscheid. He studied Business Administration in Cologne for three terms.

== Career ==
In 2010, Küfner read an article in Vice about Bitcoin and saw the potential of the new technology. Fascinated by the possibilities of the blockchain he started mining. He installed a power line in his basement, bought high-performance servers and offered computing power for the mining process, earning many Bitcoins. In 2014, he invested in the Ethereum cryptocurrency.

Küfner changed his focus to the technology behind Bitcoin, Distributed Ledger Technology. He met Till Wendler and Florian Reike at a gathering of Bitcoin enthusiasts in Berlin and together they founded nakamo.to in 2017, company for researching and developing DLT. The company was named after Satoshi Nakamoto, the supposed creator of Bitcoin. Since 2018, nakamo.to is part of the Advanced Blockchain AG. The main aim is to develop DLT further to use it as a solution to decentralize tasks, for example in manufacturing or the automotive industry.

The new project peaq, cofounded by Küfner, is focusing on further development of directed acyclic graphs. Through the project the Dagchain was invented as an alternative approach to reach consensus within directed acyclic graphs.

In 2017, Manager Magazin sent a photographer to Küfner's Florida villa, where he held a bootcamp for nakamo.to. The magazine published a long article focusing mostly on cryptocurrency and the wealth of the group members. The magazine Maize printed an article by Küfner about the possibilities of DLT, in which he criticises the focus on earning money through Bitcoins instead of understanding the underlying technology. The magazine eins put more emphasis on Küfner's position as DLT and blockchain expert.

In 2018 Küfner published Das Krypto-Jahrzehnt to explain the history of cryptocurrencies from 2008 until 2018. He wanted to give an overview of the story as one of the few who had been involved from the beginning.

== Publications ==
- Das Krypto-Jahrzehnt: Was seit dem ersten Bitcoin alles geschehen ist - und wie digitales Geld die Welt verändern wird Börsenbuchverlag, Kulmbach 2018, ISBN 978-3-86470-600-4

== Documentaries ==
- Die Bitcoin-Millionäre: Mit vollem Einsatz ins Risiko, Arte (broadcaster Der Spiegel), German documentary, 2017.
- Reset - The Blockchain Revolution, Amazon, German documentary, 2018.
