= Wolfgang von der Nahmer =

Wolfgang von der Nahmer (14 April 1906 in Remscheid – 12 October 1988 in Wuppertal) was a German conductor and university lecturer.

In 1933 he was Kapellmeister at the Mecklenburg State Theatre. Then, in 1953 he was professor of conducting at the Musikhochschule Köln.

From 1948 to 1959 he was also the first opera conductor in Cologne and directed numerous world premieres and first performances.
