= Teo Otto Theater =

Theatre in Remscheid, Germany

Coordinates: 51°10′54″N 7°11′16″E

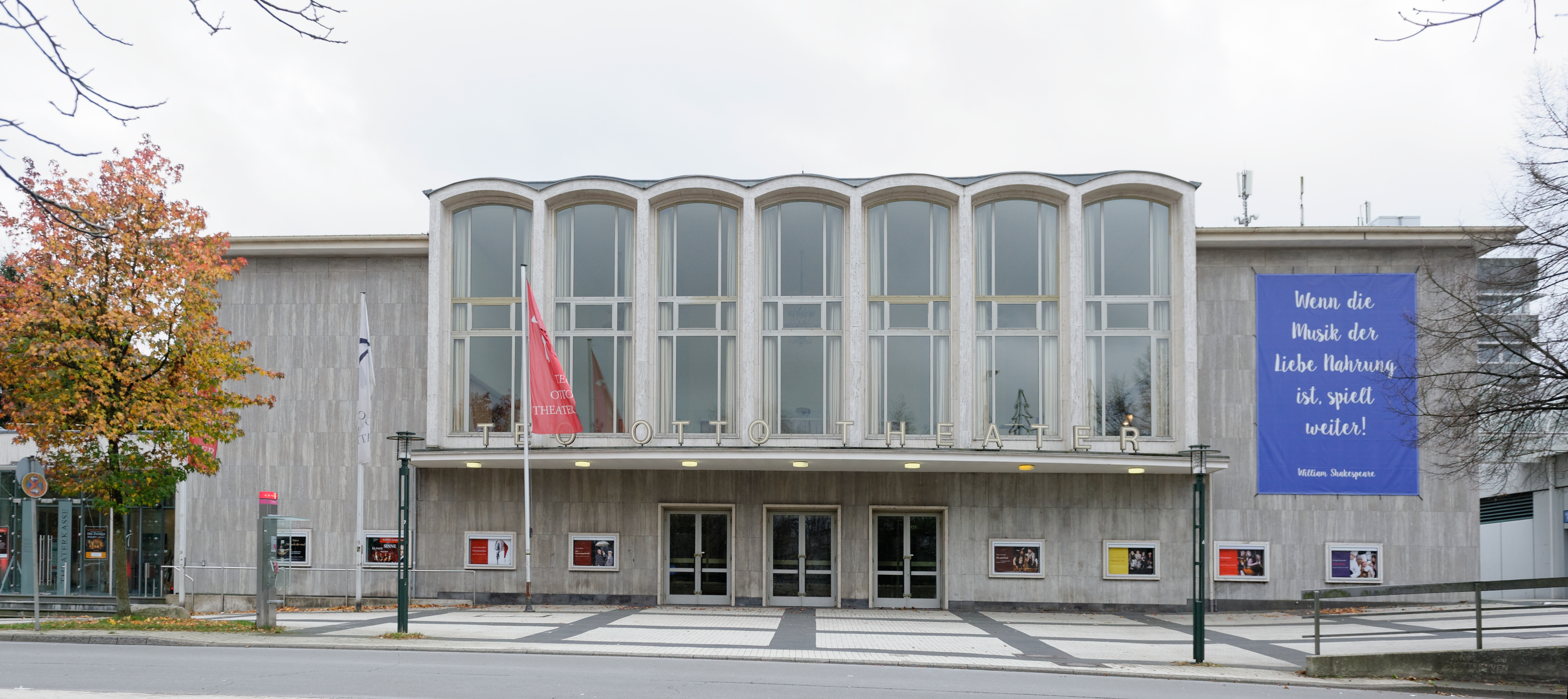
The Theo Otto Theater in Remscheid

Teo Otto Theater is a theatre in Remscheid, North Rhine-Westphalia, Germany.
