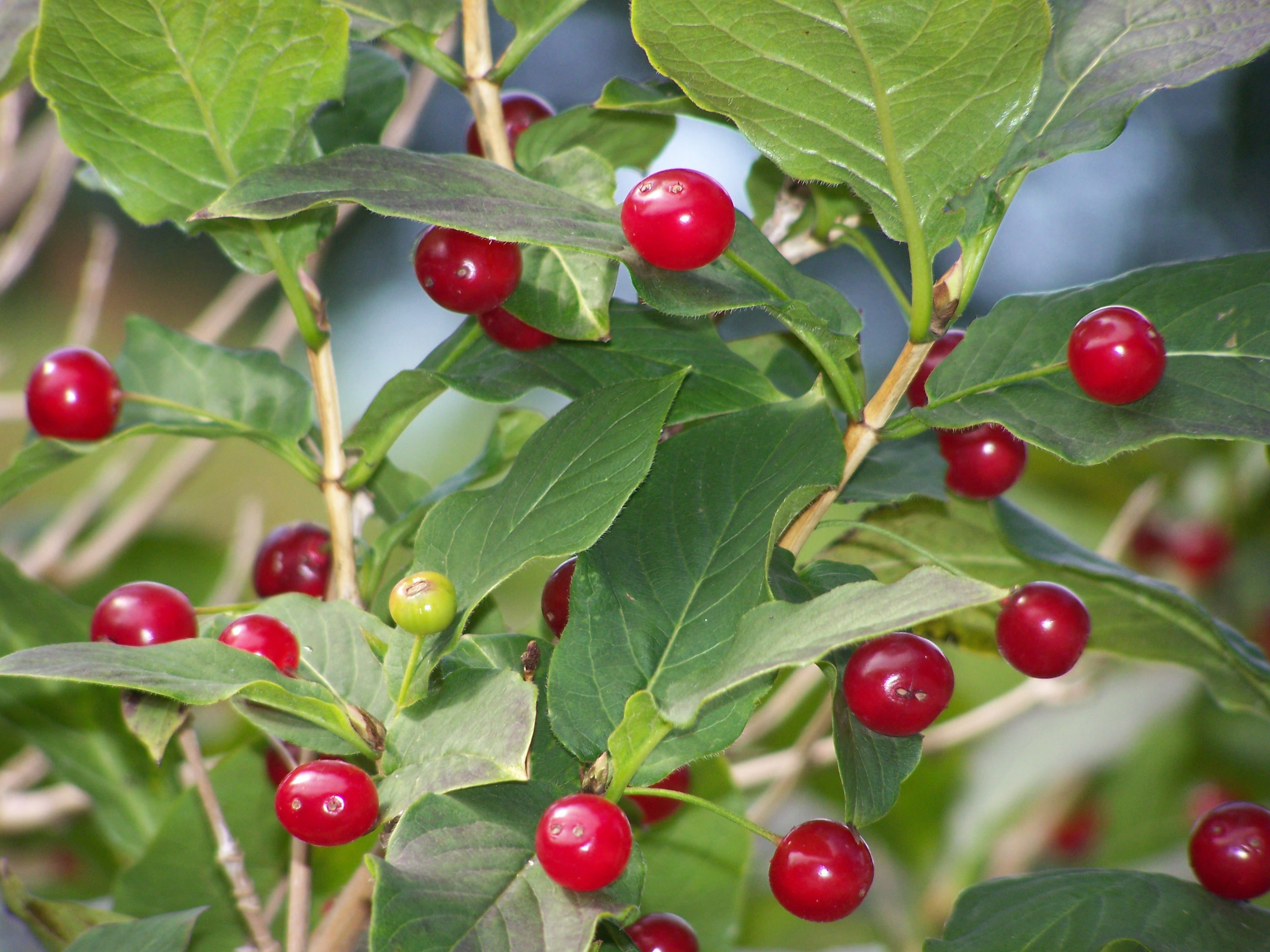

Scientific classification
- Kingdom: Plantae
- Clade: Embryophytes
- Clade: Tracheophytes
- Clade: Spermatophytes
- Clade: Angiosperms
- Clade: Eudicots
- Clade: Asterids
- Order: Dipsacales
- Family: Caprifoliaceae
- Genus: Lonicera
- Species: L. alpigena

Binomial name
- Lonicera alpigena L.

Synonyms
- Caprifolium alpigenum (L.) Gaertn.; Caprifolium alpinum Lam.; Chamaecerasus alpigena (L.) Medik.; Euchylia alpigena (L.) Dulac; Isika alpigena (L.) Borkh.; Xylosteon alpigenum (L.) Fuss

= Lonicera alpigena =

Alpine honeysuckle

Species of honeysuckle

Lonicera alpigena L., (Note: Not to be confused with L. alpigena C.B. Clarke, syn. L. webbiana Wall. ex DC.) known as alpine honeysuckle, is a species of honeysuckle native to mountain forests of Central and Southern Europe. It is sometimes cultivated as an ornamental plant outside its native range. It is a deciduous shrub up to 2 m high, and in late summer, bears conspicuous brilliant red inedible fruits superficially resembling cherries. L. glehnii F. Schmidt, which is native to Sakhalin, Kurile Islands, Hokkaido and Honshu, is sometimes considered as a geographically disjunct subspecies of alpine honeysuckle, L. alpigena L. subsp. glehnii (F. Schmidt) H. Hara.
