= Hans Stammreich =

- Born: July 16, 1902 --> Remscheid, Prussia, Germany
- Died: March 6, 1969 (aged 66); São Paulo, Brazil
- Education: Doctorate in Physical Chemistry
- Alma mater: Technische Universität Berlin
- Occupation: Molecular Spectroscopist
- Known for: Pioneering scientific work in Raman Spectroscopy

Hans Stammreich (July 16, 1902 in Remscheid, Prussia, Germany - March 6, 1969 in São Paulo, Brazil) was a Brazilian chemist of German origin and an important pioneer of Raman spectroscopy and molecular spectroscopy.

== Life ==
After obtaining his PhD in physical chemistry after studying under Adolf Miethe at Technische Hochschule Berlin (today Technische Universität Berlin), Stammreich became soon, partly influenced by his personal friendship with Albert Einstein, interested in molecular spectroscopy, especially Raman spectroscopy. In the summer of 1924 he joined the Photochemistry Institute of the Berlin Polytechnic as an assistant researching the apparent formation of gold in Mercury lamps. In 1927 he was appointed permanent head assistant of the department. In 1920 he married Charlotte Marcuse a laboratory assistant in the institute. In 1930 he was appointed to by in charge to organize and direct the Spectroscopy and Spectral Analysis section of the Polytechnic school. He held this position until 1933, when he was dismissed and forced to seek refuge in France due to his Jewish background and Hitler's rise to power.

He lived in Paris, where he stayed until 1940, working in the labs of Paul Langevin and Charles Fabry at the Sorbonne, with a brief interruption in 1935/36, when he first made aliyah with his wife and briefly lived in Palestine (with a written recommendation letter by Einstein), and subsequently briefly worked in Teheran. In 1940, Stammreich and his wife obtained a visa for Brazil and emigrated via Casablanca. Whereas Stammreich's wife Charlotte could directly travel to Brazil without problems, Hans was briefly arrested and put in a POW camp by the French Vichy government, but was subsequently released and deported to Portugal, whence he left for Brazil.

In Brazil Stammreich became professor for Physical Chemistry at the University of São Paulo, where he soon resumed his work in Raman spectroscopy. Stammreich was an excellent experimenter, amongst many other innovations in 1956 he was the first to obtain Raman spectra with a Helium lamp. A detailed list of his scientific innovations can be found in the web article by Andre Trombetta cited below.

== Sources ==
- Bernhard Schrader and Andreas Otto, Hans Stammreich, Bunsen-Magazin, 2. Jahrgang, 5/2000, S. 120–122:
- Hans Stammreich: in André Trombetta, since 2011: „Neglected Science – Scientific Research in developing countries" http://www.neglectedscience.com/alphabetical-list/s/hans-stammreich
