= Corridonia =

- Comune
- Comune di Corridonia
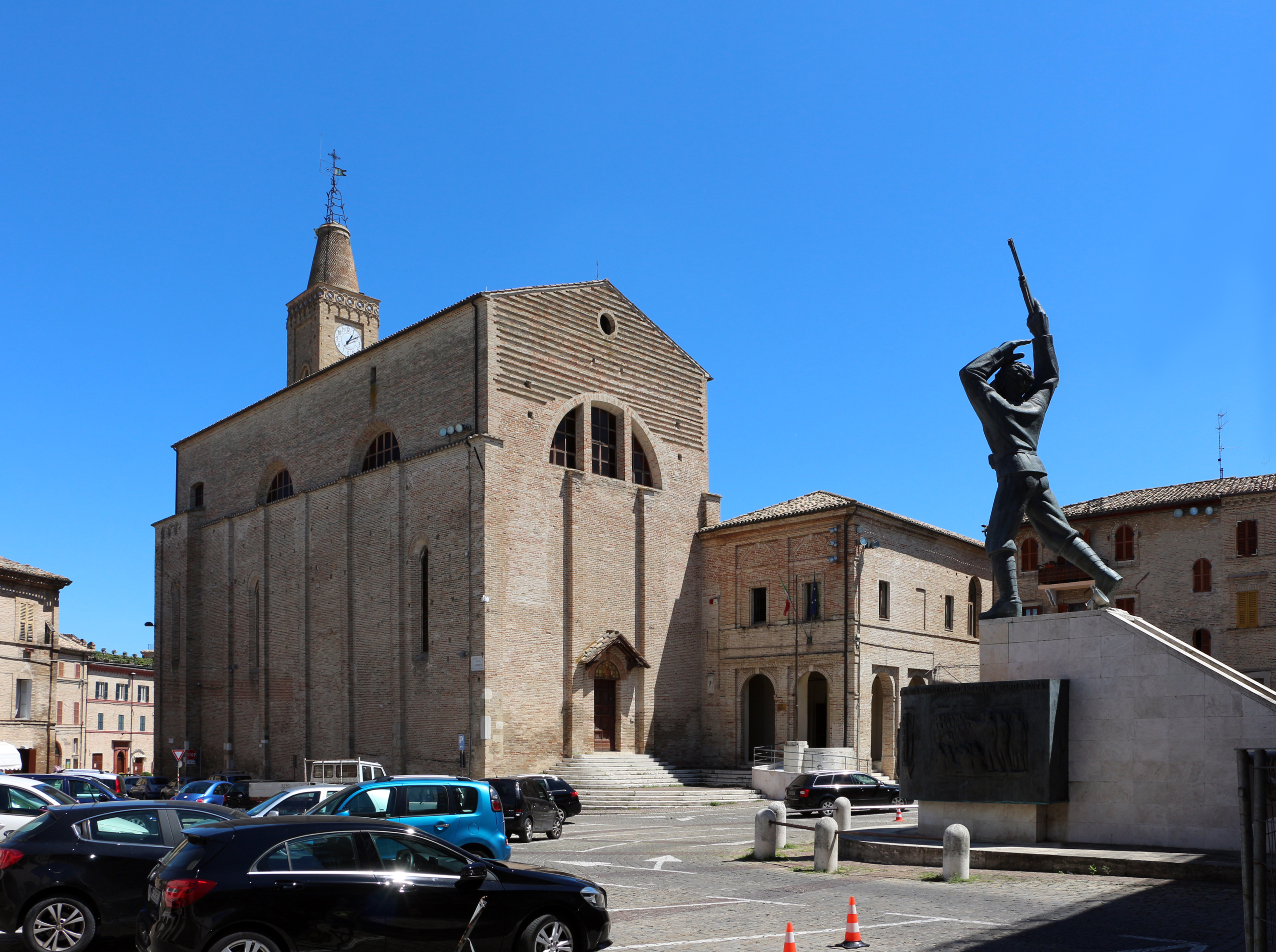

- Coat of arms

- Location within Italy Location within Marche
- Coordinates: 43°15′N 13°31′E
- Country: Italy
- Region: Marche
- Province: Macerata (MC)
- Frazioni: Colbuccaro, Passo del Bidollo, San Claudio, Contrada Sarrocciano

Government
  - Mayor: Giuliana Giampaoli

Area
  - Total: 61.97 km^{2} (23.93 sq mi)
- Elevation: 261 m (856 ft)

Population (28 February 2017)
  - Total: 15,427
  - Density: 248.9/km^{2} (644.8/sq mi)
- Demonym: Corridoniani
- Time zone: UTC+1 (CET)
  - Summer (DST): UTC+2 (CEST)
- Postal code: 62014
- Dialing code: 0733
- Patron saint: SS. Peter and Paul
- Saint day: 29 June
- Website: Official website

Corridonia is a comune (municipality) in the Province of Macerata in the Italian region Marche.It is located about 40 kilometres (25 mi) south of Ancona and about 8 kilometres (5 mi) southeast of Macerata.

Corridonia was called, until 1931, Pausula which was later changed by Benito Mussolini to honor Filippo Corridoni, an interventionist syndicalist who died on 23 October 1915.

The old town preserves some sections of walls and monumental buildings, including the parish church which has an interesting art gallery attached to it.

- Church of San Claudio al Chienti
- Church of Saints Peter, Paul and Donato with art gallery
- Church of San Francesco
- Church of Sant'Agostino
- Monastery of the Zoccolanti (Corridonia)

Corridonia borders the following municipalities: Francavilla d'Ete, Macerata, Mogliano, Monte San Giusto, Monte San Pietrangeli, Morrovalle, Petriolo, Tolentino, and Urbisaglia.

== Notable people ==
- Filippo Corridoni, syndicalist
- Giovanni Battista Velluti, castrated opera singer
- Massimo Ciocci, football player
- Luigi Lanzi, antiquarian
