= Günter Bandmann =

German art historian (1917–1975)

- Born: 10 September 1917; Duisburg
- Died: 24 February 1975 (aged 57); Bonn
- Occupation: Art historian

Günter Bandmann (10 September 1917 – 24 February 1975) was an art historian, professor at the University of Tübingen from 1965, professor at the University of Bonn from 1970. His research interests included medieval art: architecture, iconography and iconology.

== Works ==
- Maria-Laach. München: Deutscher Kunstverlag. 1947.
- Die Bauformen des Mittelalters. Berlin: Athenäum. 1949.
- Die Werdener Abteikirche (1256–1275): Studie zum Ausgang der staufischen Baukunst. Bonn: Rudolf Habelt. 1953.
- Melancholie und Musik. Ikonographische Studien. Wissenschaftliche Abhandlungen der Arbeitsgemeinschaft für Forschung des Landes Nordrhein-Westfalen. Wiesbaden: Springer. 1960. ISBN 978-3-663-00783-8.
- Zum Wirklichkeitsbegriff. Wiesbaden: Verlag der Akademie der Wissenschaften und der Literatur. 1974.
