= List of municipalities of the Province of Benevento =

The following is a list of the 78 municipalities (comuni) of the Province of Benevento in the region of Campania in Italy.

== List ==
Municipality	Population (2026)	Area (km²)	Density
Airola	8,089	14.90	542.9
Amorosi	2,629	11.22	234.3
Apice	5,175	49.04	105.5
Apollosa	2,419	21.12	114.5
Arpaia	1,983	4.96	399.8
Arpaise	722	6.66	108.4
Baselice	1,980	47.82	41.4
Benevento	55,330	130.84	422.9
Bonea	1,336	11.46	116.6
Bucciano	1,950	7.94	245.6
Buonalbergo	1,478	25.08	58.9
Calvi	2,465	22.31	110.5
Campolattaro	959	17.59	54.5
Campoli del Monte Taburno	1,642	9.80	167.6
Casalduni	1,176	23.34	50.4
Castelfranco in Miscano	761	43.40	17.5
Castelpagano	1,317	38.26	34.4
Castelpoto	1,093	11.78	92.8
Castelvenere	2,367	15.44	153.3
Castelvetere in Val Fortore	915	34.58	26.5
Cautano	1,850	19.72	93.8
Ceppaloni	3,181	23.80	133.7
Cerreto Sannita	3,498	33.35	104.9
Circello	2,058	45.66	45.1
Colle Sannita	2,155	37.28	57.8
Cusano Mutri	3,733	58.86	63.4
Dugenta	2,627	16.05	163.7
Durazzano	2,057	12.91	159.3
Faicchio	3,161	43.99	71.9
Foglianise	3,101	11.77	263.5
Foiano di Val Fortore	1,301	41.31	31.5
Forchia	1,190	5.45	218.3
Fragneto l'Abate	893	20.57	43.4
Fragneto Monforte	1,646	24.49	67.2
Frasso Telesino	1,946	21.82	89.2
Ginestra degli Schiavoni	378	14.79	25.6
Guardia Sanframondi	4,465	21.10	211.6
Limatola	4,220	18.38	229.6
Melizzano	1,636	17.59	93.0
Moiano	3,986	20.20	197.3
Molinara	1,388	24.16	57.5
Montefalcone di Val Fortore	1,260	41.94	30.0
Montesarchio	12,969	26.51	489.2
Morcone	4,422	101.33	43.6
Paduli	3,524	45.30	77.8
Pago Veiano	2,167	23.75	91.2
Pannarano	1,962	11.80	166.3
Paolisi	1,940	6.00	323.3
Paupisi	1,381	6.83	202.2
Pesco Sannita	1,798	24.15	74.5
Pietraroja	493	35.81	13.8
Pietrelcina	2,869	28.25	101.6
Ponte	2,388	17.92	133.3
Pontelandolfo	1,941	29.03	66.9
Puglianello	1,262	8.76	144.1
Reino	1,063	23.64	45.0
San Bartolomeo in Galdo	4,191	82.67	50.7
San Giorgio del Sannio	9,633	22.34	431.2
San Giorgio La Molara	2,645	65.77	40.2
San Leucio del Sannio	2,877	9.96	288.9
San Lorenzello	2,079	13.88	149.8
San Lorenzo Maggiore	1,855	16.30	113.8
San Lupo	667	15.30	43.6
San Marco dei Cavoti	2,895	49.19	58.9
San Martino Sannita	1,136	6.18	183.8
San Nazzaro	819	2.04	401.5
San Nicola Manfredi	3,373	19.22	175.5
San Salvatore Telesino	3,856	18.31	210.6
Sant'Agata de' Goti	10,007	63.38	157.9
Sant'Angelo a Cupolo	3,989	11.01	362.3
Sant'Arcangelo Trimonte	460	9.80	46.9
Santa Croce del Sannio	857	16.24	52.8
Sassinoro	606	13.25	45.7
Solopaca	3,376	31.13	108.4
Telese Terme	7,607	10.00	760.7
Tocco Caudio	1,459	27.49	53.1
Torrecuso	3,224	29.16	110.6
Vitulano	2,662	35.99	74.0

== See also ==
- List of municipalities of Campania
- List of municipalities of Italy
