= Torquato Tamagnini =

Italian sculptor and medallist (1886–1965)

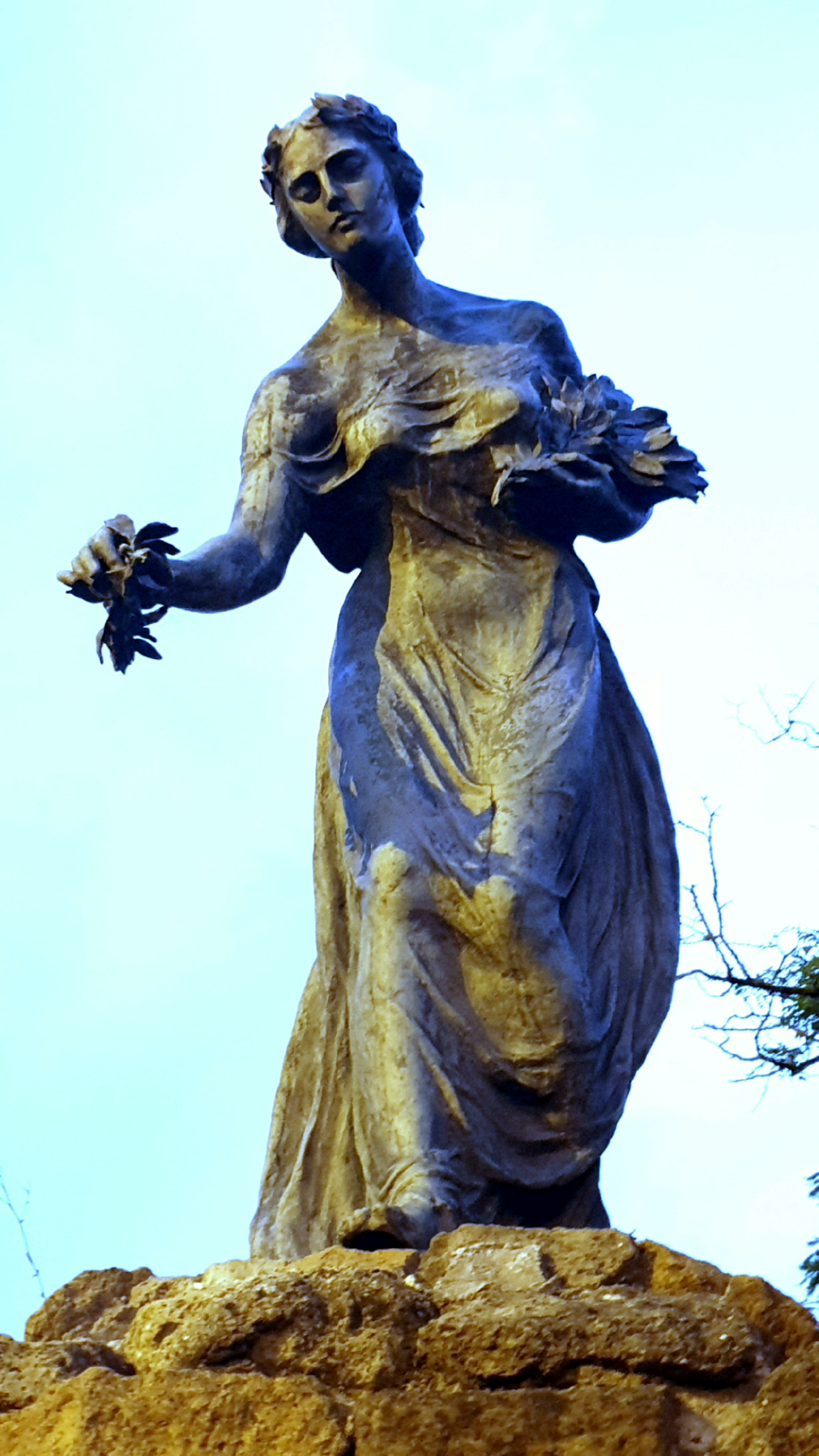
Sorrowful Victory (War Memorial 15-18 of the Parochietta)

Torquato Tamagnini (Perugia, 1886 - Rome, 1965) was an Italian sculptor and medallist.

He is best known for his numerous monuments to the fallen soldiers of the First World War.

== Biography ==
Trained at the Accademia di San Luca in Rome, Tamagnini was the author of several small bronzes in Art Nouveau style, including a 1919 statuette entitled ''The Inquisitor,'' preserved in the collections of the Quirinal Palace. In 1921 he participated with two works in the First Roman Biennial and, in the same year, participated in the First Naples Biennial. A bronze plaque made by the sculptor featuring, in relief, the Victory Bulletin and an allegory with female figures, donated to Marshal Diaz by the Roman amputees, earned words of admiration from the general.

After the first commissions from the various committees that had been created to honor the fallen soldiers, in 1922 he founded the ''Corinthia'' art house in Rome, through which, in collaboration with Neapolitan and Roman foundries, he started a workshop and produced numerous monuments in many Italian regions. The catalogue of "Corinthia", as well as other competing catalogues, offered municipal administrations and civic committees a wide range of monuments, either already made elsewhere or in the form of sketches. The "variety of types of monuments devised by this kind of memorial industry" allowed a choice to be made according to financial availability. However, although the catalog was rich in proposals and variations were often introduced to the various types of monuments especially in the plinths, resemblances were inevitable. In some cases the resemblance is evident, for example: in the figures of Perugia and Scanno; in the sentinels of Sacrofano, Tocco da Casauria, Calasetta and Parenti; in the monument of Forli del Sannio and that of Casalciprano, similar in concept; in the "Sorrowful Victory" of Parrocchietta already present together with a dying soldier in Ceprano as later reproduced in Guardia Perticara, in Terranova da Sibari, in Dasà, in Colle Sannita and, probably, in Castropignano. In others an iconography common to other artists of the period is discernible, as in the case of the monument in Montepulciano, and the so-called "quadriga briosa" depicted on the 1 lira coins of the war period.

== Works ==
=== Monuments to the Fallen of the Great War ===
The list is organized by: year, municipality and province. The description is limited to the main sculptural works of each monument.

- 1920 - Perugia: marble plaque between two bronze figures dedicated to the students of the Royal Agrarian Institute of Perugia who died in the war.
- 1920 - Faleria (Viterbo): marble plaque with bronze decorations.
- 1921 - Pievebovigliana (Macerata): bronze eagle on an obelisk.
- 1921 - Venafro (Isernia): bronze group on a memorial stone consisting of a bare-chested soldier holding a bayonet and protecting a standing woman holding an infant: in front of the plinth a winged female figure raises a laurel wreath.
- 1921 - Castelleone (Deruta) (Perugia): marble sculpture on a travertine base; on a first block of marble is carved a bas-relief with the allegory of Victory on a quadriga; on the upper block is a sculpture of a bare-chested man emerging from the marble.
- 1921 - Sacrofano (Rome): bronze statue of a soldier standing on a rocky spur wearing a greatcoat; on the base a bronze plate with a bas-relief depicting an allegory of the Motherland.
- 1921 - Seren del Grappa (Belluno): bronze statue of a woman holding a laurel wreath in her right hand and a winged victory in her left hand.
- 1922 - Salvitelle (Salerno): bronze statue of a woman holding a laurel wreath in her right hand and a winged victory in her left hand.
- 1922 - Ceprano (Frosinone): bronze group with a dying soldier lying on a travertine block on which stands a woman, allegory of the victorious Motherland, offering him a laurel branch.
- 1923 - La Parrocchietta (Rome): bronze statue of a female figure, allegory of the Sorrowful Victory, holding a laurel branch to the fallen.
- 1923 - Tocco da Casauria (Pescara, formerly Chieti): bronze statue of a soldier standing on a rocky spur wearing a greatcoat; on the base a bronze plate with a bas-relief depicting an allegory of the Motherland.
- 1923 - Rome: bronze statue of an artillery soldier, wearing a greatcoat, on a rocky spur.
- 1923 - Arcevia (Ancona): bronze group on a memorial stone consisting of a bare-chested soldier holding a bayonet and protecting a standing woman holding an infant; at the base a small bronze statue depicting Victory.
- 1923/1932 - Paola (Cosenza): bronze sculptural group depicting a female figure on a pedestal, allegory of the Motherland, raising a laurel wreath, while at her feet lies a mortally wounded soldier.
- 1923 - Sala Consilina (Salerno): bronze sculpture of a standing, dying soldier, surmounted by a laurel-wreathed female figure leaning over him for support.
- 1923/1925 - Pizzoferrato (Chieti): bronze plaque with the Victory Bulletin, decorated in bas-relief on the left by a winged victory and a bearer of the fasces, on the right by two coats of arms on oak leaves.
- 1923/1929 - Forlì del Sannio (Isernia): monument including a bronze statue of a woman, an allegory of Glory, raising a laurel wreath, and a bronze slab with a female figure, an allegory of Victory, on a quadriga.
- 1924 - Corigliano Calabro (Cosenza): bronze group on a memorial stone consisting of a soldier with a bayonet protecting a woman with a child. During World War II, however, the statue was melted down to make bullets from it, and only in the 1980s was it re-created by local sculptor Carmine Cianci.
- 1924 - Spoltore (Pescara): bronze plaque with bas-relief of an eagle wrapping its wings around a female figure, an allegory of Victory, offering a garland of flowers to the fallen.
- 1924 - Parenti (Cosenza): bronze statue of a soldier standing guard on a rocky spur wearing a closed greatcoat; however, during World War II the statue was melted down to make bullets from it, and it was not until the 1980s that it was re-created by a Neapolitan workshop, but this time the soldier has an open greatcoat.
- 1924 - Montecelio (Metropolitan City of Rome Capital, then Province of Rome) Tall commemorative stone with a bronze statue above and a bronze slab at the base with a female figure, an allegory of Victory, on a quadriga.
- 1925 - Carlentini (Syracuse): bronze sculpture of a standing, dying soldier, surmounted by a winged female figure leaning over him for support.
- 1925 - Formello (Metropolitan City of Rome Capital, then Province of Rome): Bronze statue of a woman reaching forward with her right hand holding a laurel wreath and with her left hand holding a small winged Victory.
- 1925 - Allumiere (Metropolitan City of Rome Capital, then Province of Rome): Bronze statue of a soldier on a rocky outcrop, throwing a hand grenade with his right and raising a flag with his left.
- 1925 - San Giovanni in Marignano (Rimini): bronze statue of a soldier with a rifle and a helmet and a bronze plate with female figures and horses.
- 1925/1930 - Montepulciano (Siena)
- 1926 - Guardia Perticara (Potenza): bronze group of a standing woman offering a laurel branch to a dying soldier lying at her feet.
- 1926 - Acquaro (Vibo Valentia): bronze statue of a soldier with a rifle and a helmet.
- 1926 - Mondolfo (Pesaro and Urbino): bronze statue of a soldier on a rocky outcrop, raising a flag with his right hand.
- 1926 - Gerace Marina (Metropolitan City of Reggio Calabria, then Province of Reggio Calabria): Bronze sculptural group representing a female figure on a pedestal, allegory of the Motherland, raising a laurel wreath while a mortally wounded soldier leans at her feet.
- 1926 - Seminara (Metropolitan City of Reggio Calabria, then Province of Reggio Calabria): Bronze statue of a soldier on a rocky outcrop, raising a flag with his right hand.
- 1926 - Duronia (Campobasso): bronze statue of a soldier with a rifle and a helmet.
- 1926 (circa) - Taviano (Lecce): a bronze eagle on an obelisk and a bronze slab at the base with a female figure, an allegory of Victory, on a quadriga.
- 1926/1927 - Terranova da Sibari (Cosenza): bronze group of a standing woman offering a laurel branch to a dying soldier lying at her feet.
- 1926/1927 - Dasà (Vibo Valentia): bronze group of a standing woman offering a laurel branch to a dying soldier lying at her feet.
- 1926/1929 - Tito (Potenza): bronze group of a standing woman offering a laurel branch to a dying soldier lying at her feet.
- 1927 - Calasetta (South Sardinia, then province of Cagliari): Bronze statue of a soldier standing on guard on a rock with a closed greatcoat.
- 1927 - Montazzoli (Chieti): bronze statue of a soldier holding a rifle resting on the ground with his left hand and pointing a bayonet forward with his outstretched right arm; at the base, a small winged Victory raising a laurel wreath.
- 1928 - Andretta (Avellino): bronze group on a high pedestal with a female figure holding a laurel wreath and a fallen soldier at her feet; on two columns on either side of the pedestal are two bronze plaques with female figures in bas-relief.
- 1928 - Galatina (Lecce): a tall monument with a bronze statue of a female figure wearing a helmet and a shield with a Roman eagle insignia; in front of the pedestal a statue of a soldier with a rifle in resting position; behind, a bronze plaque with Victory on a quadriga.
- 1929 - Orvinio (Rieti): bronze statue of a female figure called "The Glory" holding a torch, a monument with a rectangular fenced garden divided by hedges with geometric figures.
- 1930 - Siano (Salerno): bronze statue of a soldier with a rifle and a helmet and a bronze plate on a pedestal with a female figure, allegory of Victory, on a quadriga.
- 1931 - Casacanditella (Chieti): bronze high relief of a bare-chested soldier, with his right hand holding a rifle resting on the ground, and with his outstretched left hand holding a small winged Victory raising a laurel wreath.
- 1931 - Spezzano Albanese (Cosenza): bronze statue of a soldier on a rocky outcrop raising a flag with his right hand; at the foot of the pedestal a statue of a woman holding a winged Victory.
- 1932 - Silvi (Teramo): bronze bas-relief of a female figure on a quadriga holding a small winged Victory in her left hand; originally there was a statue of a female figure in front of the pedestal raising a laurel wreath.
- 1934 - Castelforte (Latina): bronze group with a soldier who has been shot and a second soldier without a shirt who is fighting.

==== Undatable ====
- Padula (Salerno)
- Sant’Antimo (Metropolitan City of Naples, then Province of Naples): Bronze statue of a soldier throwing a hand grenade with his right hand and raising a flag with his left hand.
- Camino al Tagliamento (Udine): two bronze plaques with bas-reliefs; on the first, the bulletin of victory decorated with the winged Victory and the bearer of the fasces; on the other, the names of the fallen with the allegory of the Motherland armed with a sword.
- San Valentino in Abruzzo Citeriore (Pescara): marble plaque with bronze friezes, including a plate with a bas-relief of a soldier's head with a helmet and his outstretched arm holding a small winged Victory.
- Colle Sannita (Benevento): bronze group of a standing woman offering a laurel branch to a dying soldier lying at her feet.
- Poggio Sannita (Isernia): bronze plaque with the Victory Bulletin, decorated in bas-relief on the left with the winged Victory and the bearer of the fasces, on the right with two shields on oak leaves; below a bronze plaque with the head of a soldier with helmet and sword.
- Casalciprano (Campobasso): monument consisting of a bronze statue of a woman, an allegory of Glory, raising a torch; a bronze plaque with a female figure, an allegory of Victory, on a quadriga; the plaque is surmounted by a bronze eagle taken from another site and relocated here.
- Scanno (L'Aquila): marble plaque between two bronze figures flanked by a bronze laurel wreath (with a helmet).
- Riese Pio X (Treviso): bronze plaque with the Victory Bulletin, decorated in bas-relief on the left with the winged Victory and the bearer of the fasces, and on the right with two coats of arms on oak leaves.
- Controne (Salerno): bronze plaque with the Victory Bulletin, decorated in bas-relief on the left with the winged Victory and the bearer of the fasces, and on the right with two coats of arms on oak leaves.
- Squillace (Catanzaro): bronze plaque with a female figure, allegory of Victory, on a quadriga.
- Vignanello (Viterbo): bronze statue of a soldier on a rocky outcrop, raising a flag with his right hand; at the base a statue of a woman with a small winged Victory. During the Second World War, however, the original statues were melted down to make bullets and rebuilt in the 1970s by the Viterbo sculptor Publio Muratore.
- Maserada sul Piave (Treviso): bronze statue of a soldier holding a rifle resting on the ground with his left hand and pointing a bayonet forward with his outstretched right arm.
- Pratola Serra (Avellino): bronze group with a soldier who has been shot and a second soldier without a shirt who is fighting.
- Reino (Benevento): bronze statue of a soldier in a resting position with a rifle and a helmet.
- Colliano (Salerno): bronze group depicting a soldier supporting a mortally wounded comrade. A small winged Victory is depicted on the base.
- Chieuti (Foggia): bronze statue of a soldier holding a rifle resting on the ground with his left hand and pointing a bayonet with his outstretched right arm; bronze plinth with a bas-relief of a lion.
- Deliceto (Foggia): bronze statue of a soldier with outstretched arms throwing a hand grenade.
- Celle di San Vito (Foggia): bronze plaque with a bas-relief depicting an allegory of the Motherland.
- San Marco dei Cavoti (Benevento): bronze statue of a soldier on a rocky outcrop, raising a flag with his right hand. Sculpted by Tamagnini in 1924, it was stolen by the Germans in July 1943 and later reinstalled as a copy by the Neapolitan sculptor Amedeo Garufi.

==== Attributed ====
- Roveredo in Piano (Pordenone): bronze statue of a soldier holding a rifle resting on the ground with his left hand and pointing a bayonet forward with his outstretched right arm; on the base a bronze plaque with a bas-relief of a lion.
- Casarsa della Delizia (Pordenone): bronze statue of a woman holding a laurel branch.
- Ragogna (Udine): bronze group of a standing woman offering a laurel branch to a dying soldier lying at her feet.
- Paularo (Udine): bronze statue of a female figure, allegory of mourning Victory, offering a laurel branch to the fallen.
- Torella dei Lombardi (Avellino): bronze group of a standing woman holding a laurel branch over a soldier lying at her feet.
- Sanza (Salerno): bronze statue of a soldier holding a rifle resting on the ground with his left hand and pointing a bayonet forward with his outstretched right arm.
- Lauria (Potenza): bronze statue of a woman, allegory of the victorious Motherland, raising a laurel wreath.
- Banzi (Potenza): marble plaque with bronze friezes, including a slab with a bas-relief of a soldier's head with helmet and his outstretched arm supporting a small winged Victory.
- Brienza (Potenza): bronze plaque with dedication, decorated in bas-relief on the left by a winged Victory and a bearer of fasces, and on the right by two coats of arms on oak leaves.
- Castelluccio Inferiore (Potenza): bronze plaque with the Victory Bulletin, decorated in bas-relief on the left with a winged victory and a bearer of the fasces, and on the right with two coats of arms on oak leaves.
- Spinoso (Potenza): bronze plaque with names of fallen soldiers and bas-relief of a winged female figure leaning on a fasces with her right hand and holding an olive branch with her left hand; above, a star and two coats of arms on oak leaves.
- Sant'Arcangelo (Potenza): bronze plaque with names of fallen soldiers and bas-relief of a winged female figure leaning on a fasces with her right hand and holding an olive branch with her left hand; above, a star and two coats of arms on oak leaves.

==== Unattributed ====
- San Fatucchio, hamlet of Castiglione del Lago (Perugia): Bronze statue of a soldier holding a flag in his left hand and a dagger in the other.
- Pozzuolo, hamlet of Castiglione del Lago (Perugia): bronze group on a memorial stone consisting of a soldier holding a bayonet protecting a woman with a child; at the base a small bronze statue depicting Victory.
- Alezio (Lecce): bronze statue of a woman holding a laurel branch.
- Castropignano (Campobasso): bronze group of a dying soldier lying on a travertine block with a woman, allegory of the victorious Motherland, holding out a laurel branch to him.
- San Pietro Avellana (Isernia): bronze statue of a woman raising a branch and bronze plaque with the head of a soldier with a helmet and a sword.

=== Image gallery ===
==== Monuments to the fallen soldiers of World War I ====
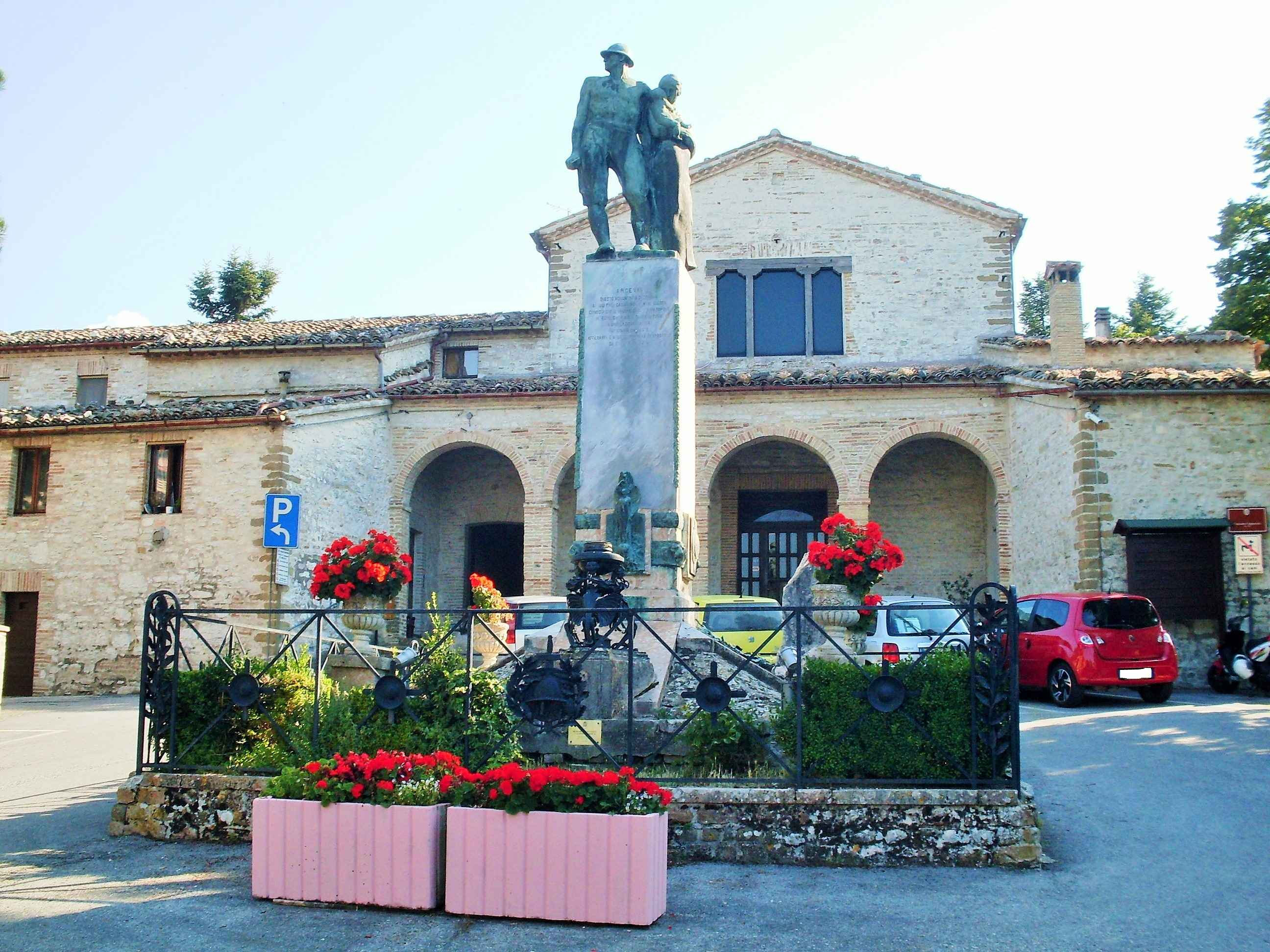
Arcevia

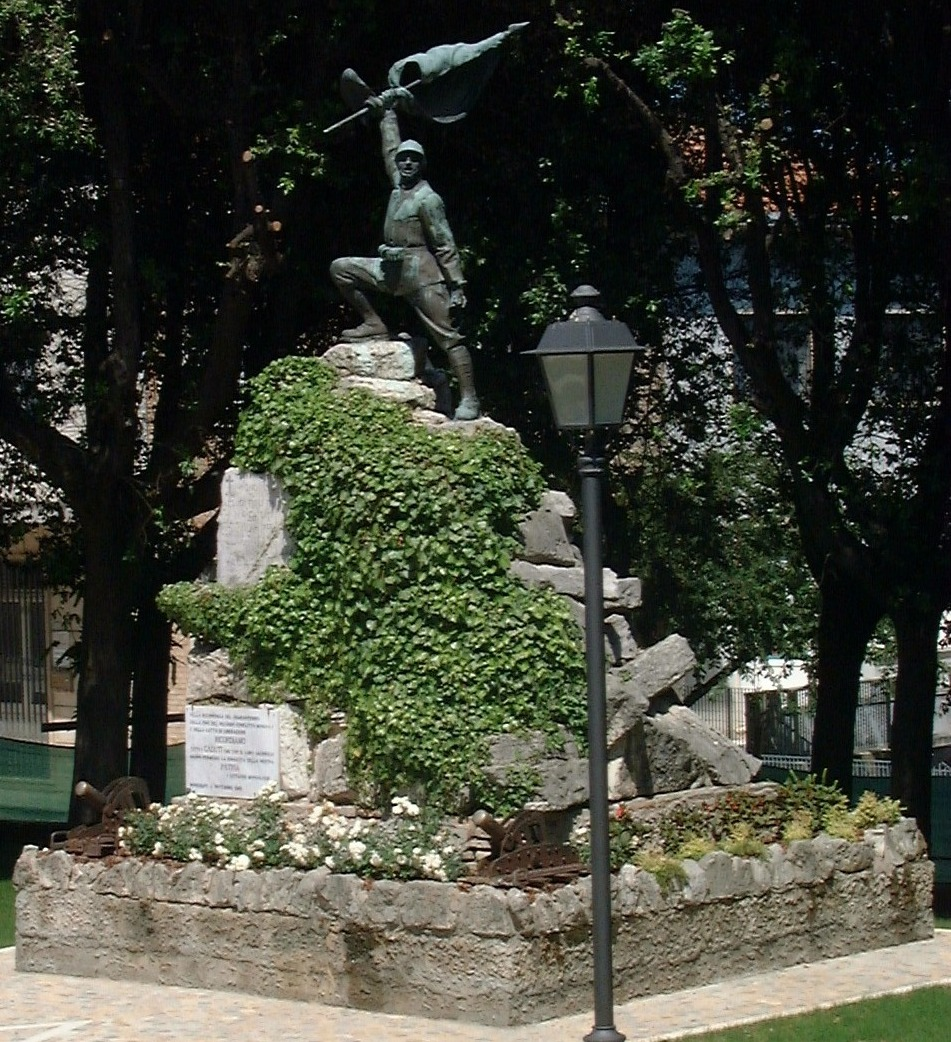
Mondolfo

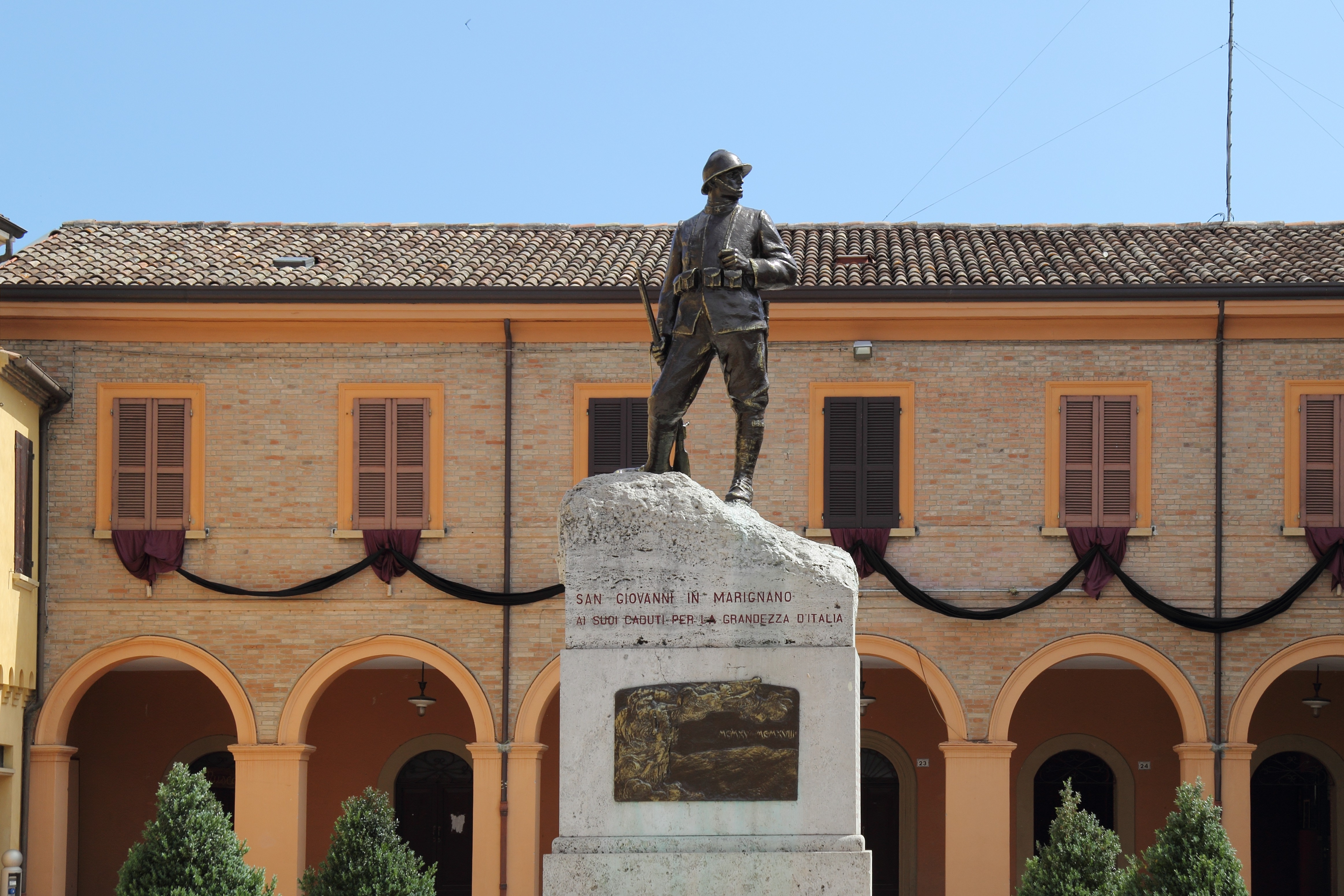
San Giovanni in Marignano

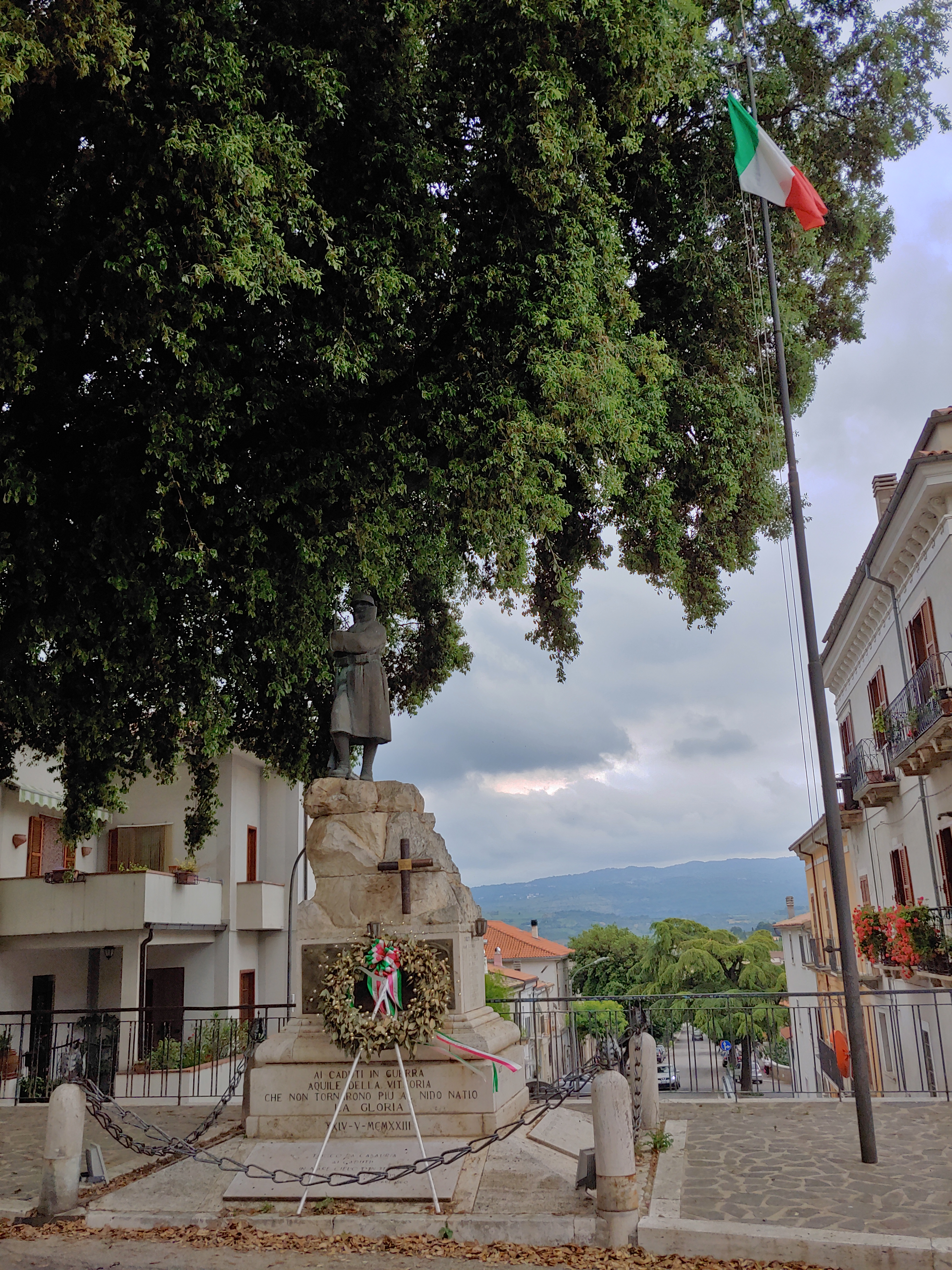
Tocco da Casauria

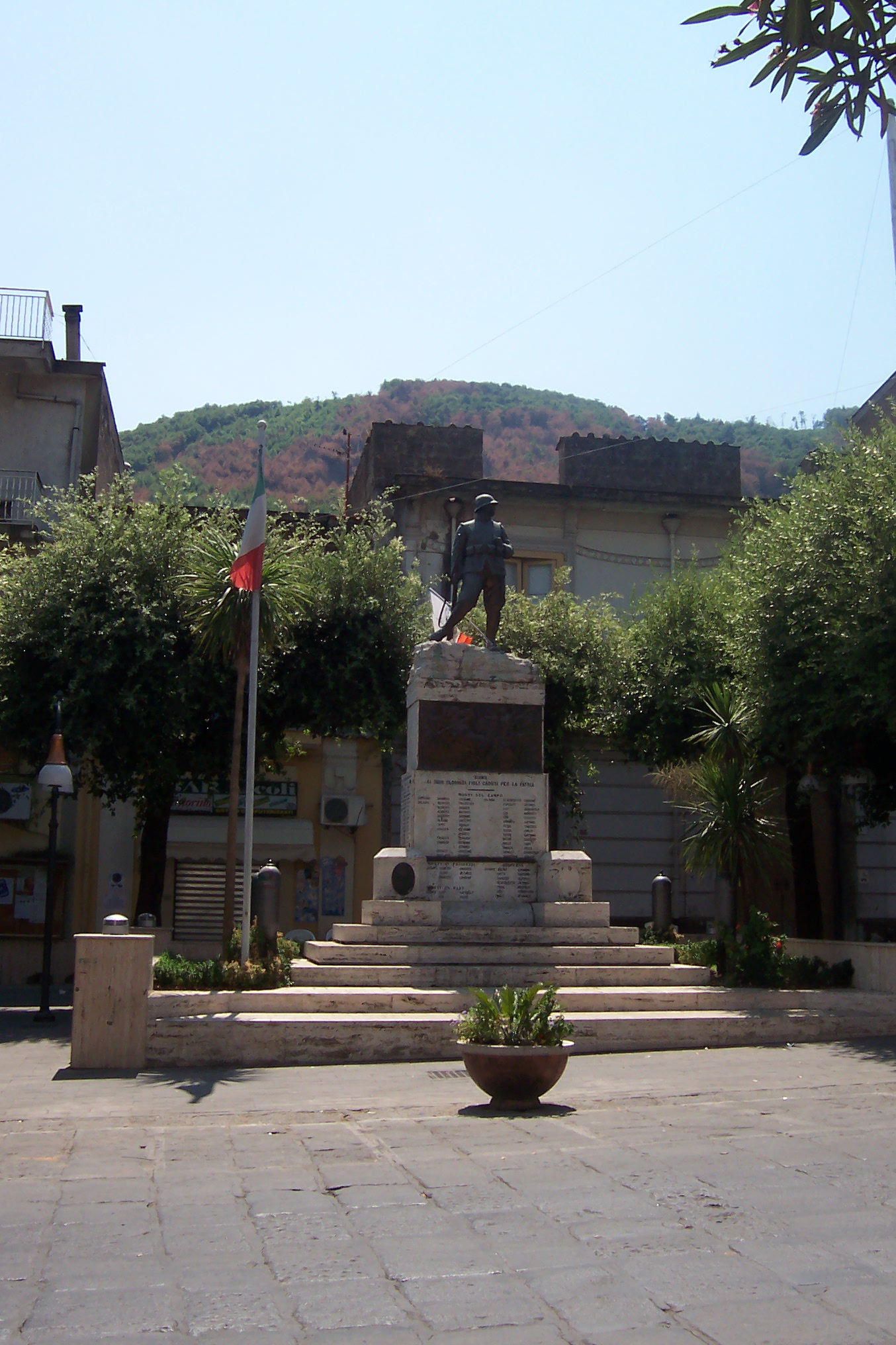
Siano

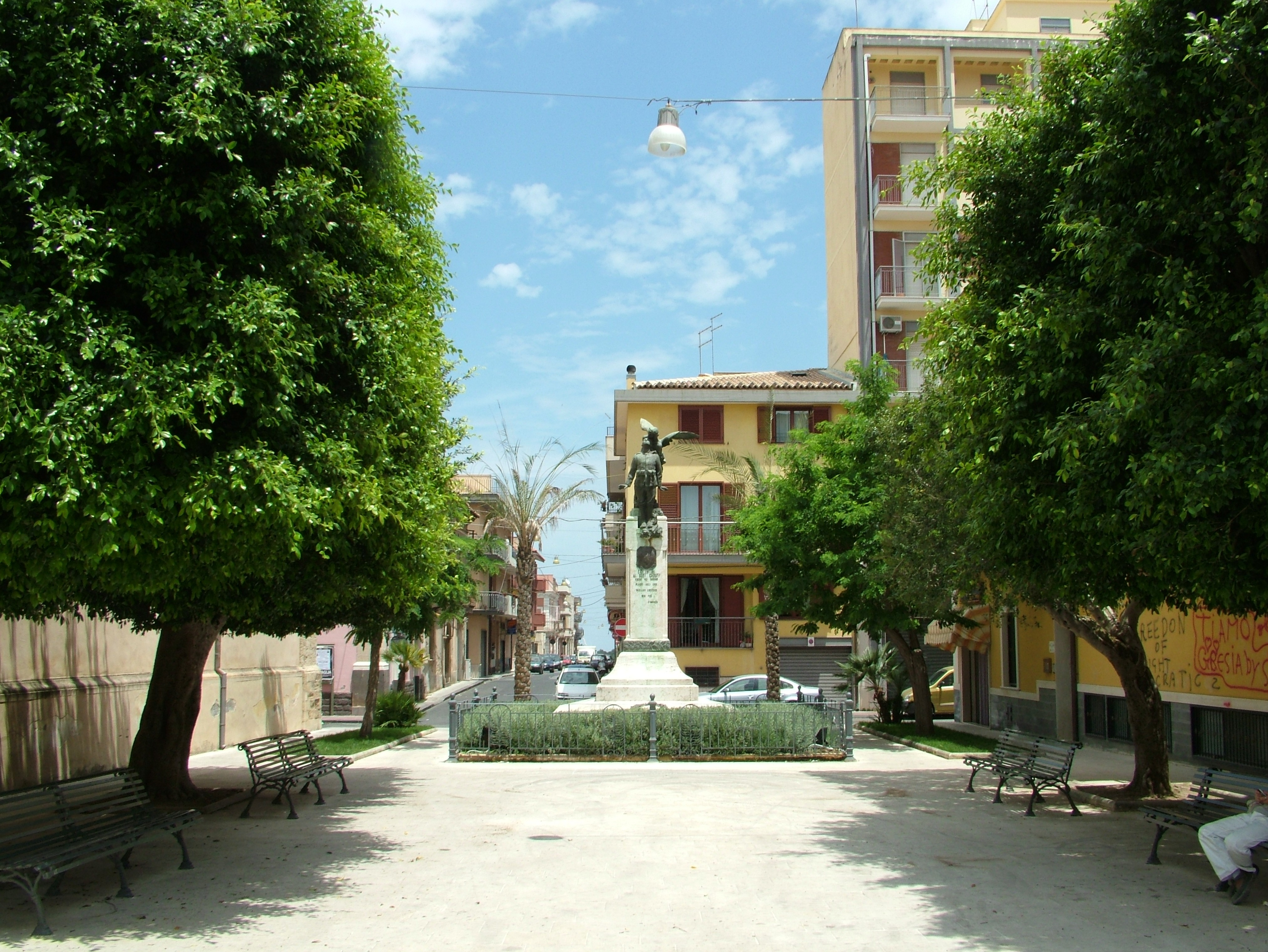
Carlentini

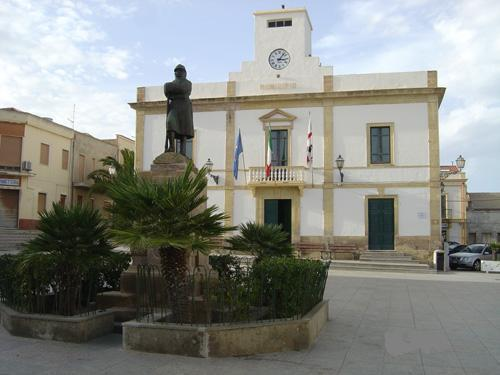
Calasetta

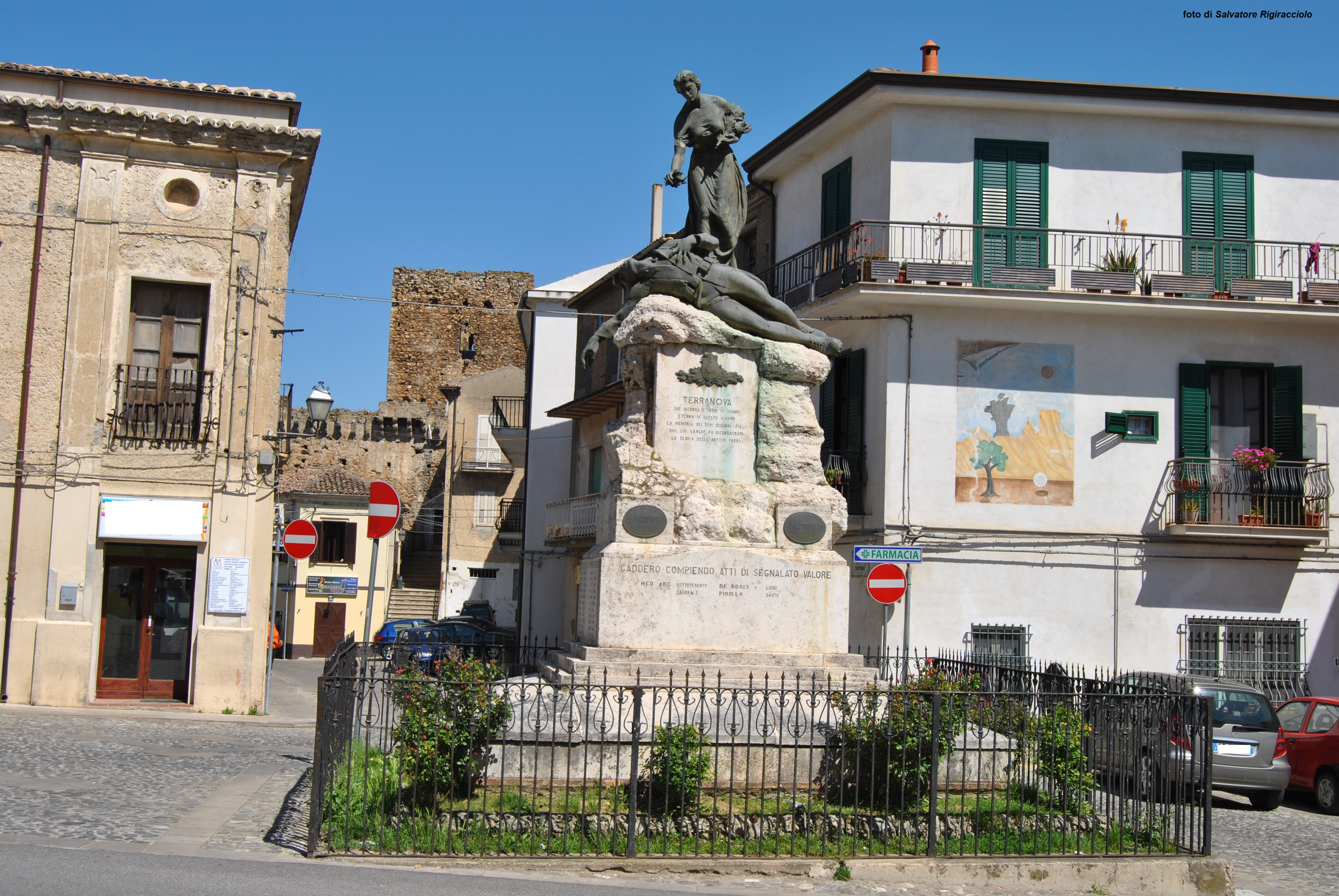
Terranova da Sibari

== See also ==
- Accademia di San Luca

== Bibliography ==
- Panzetta, Alfonso (2003). Nuovo dizionario degli scultori italiani dell'Ottocento e del primo Novecento: M-Z (in Italian). AdArte, Torino. ISBN 978-88-89082-00-3.
- Vicario, Vincenzo (1994). Gli scultori italiani dal Neoclassicismo al Liberty: L-Z (in Italian). Il Pomerio, Lodi. ISBN 978-88-7121-375-0.
- Maria Teresa Sorrenti. Giuseppe Ferraro (ed.). "I monumenti ai caduti in Calabria - Tra Case d'Arte e professori di scultura" (PDF). Dalle Trincee Alle Retrovie. I Molti Fronti della Grande Guerra. ICSAIC.
