= Fragneto =

Fragneto may refer to 2 Italian municipalities of the Province of Benevento:

- Fragneto l'Abate
- Fragneto Monforte
