= Demographics of Campania =

Historical population
Year	Pop.	±%
1861	2,402,000	—
1871	2,520,000	+4.9%
1881	2,660,000	+5.6%
1901	2,914,000	+9.5%
1911	3,102,000	+6.5%
1921	3,343,000	+7.8%
1931	3,509,000	+5.0%
1936	3,697,000	+5.4%
1951	4,346,000	+17.6%
1961	4,761,000	+9.5%
1971	5,059,000	+6.3%
1981	5,463,000	+8.0%
1991	5,630,000	+3.1%
2001	5,702,000	+1.3%
2011	5,834,000	+2.3%
2020	5,624,260	−3.6%
Source: ISTAT 2001, 2011, 2014

The resident population in Campania is 5,624,260 inhabitants as of 31 December 2020, which corresponds to 9.6% of the Italian population. The male population on 1 January 2015 reached 2,848,043 units and constituted 48.6% of the population of Campania. The female population was made up of 3,013,486 units and constituted 51.4% of the regional population. As of 1 January 2020, the foreign population residing in Campania reached 254,791 people, with an incidence on the regional population of approximately 4%, below the national average of 8%.

== Population by province ==
The population of Campania by province:

Coat of arms	Province	Number of municipalities	Population (inhabitants)	Area (km²)
	Metropolitan city of Naples	92	3.070.433	1.171
	Province of Salerno	158	1.094.087	4.954
/	Province of Caserta	104	920.288	2.651
	Province of Avellino	118	414.991	2.792
	Province of Benevento	78	274.666	2.080
	Total in Campania	550	5.774.465	13.671

== Ethnicities and foreign minorities ==
Country of origin	Number of inhabitants
Ukraine	43.415
Romania	42.380
Morocco	21.399
Sri Lanka	17.405
China	14.077
Bangladesh	11.128
Poland	9.635
India	7.992
Nigeria	7.917
Bulgaria	7.673
Pakistan	7.150
Albania	6.923
Senegal	4.600
Ghana	4.150
Philippines	3.873
Algeria	3.770
Russia	3.650
Tunisia	3.461
Brazil	2.266
Dominican Republic	2.129
Burkina Faso	2.003
Gambia	1.842
Malaysia	1.775
Ivory Coast	1.723
Moldova	1.479
Cuba	1.262
Cape Verde	1.088
Germany	1.065
Serbia	1.028

=== Demographic evolution ===
Year	Inhabitants
2004	65.396
2005	85.773
2006	92.619
2007	98.052
2008	114.792
2009	131.335
2010	147.057
2011	164.268
2012	150.306
2013	170.938
2014	203.823
2015	217.503
2016	232.214
2017	243.694
2018	258.524
