= Lago di Telese =

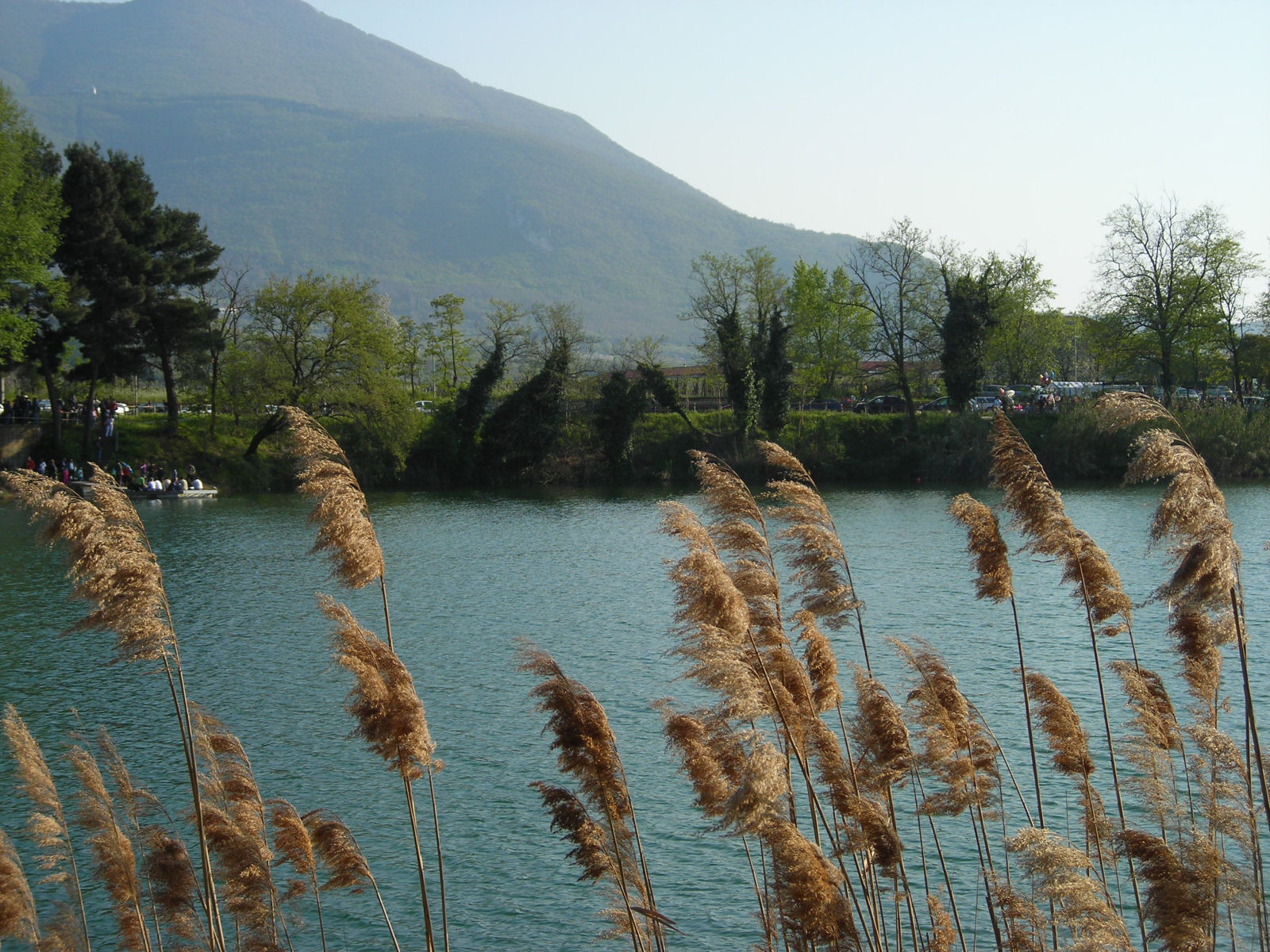

- Location within Campania
- Location: Province of Benevento, Campania
- Coordinates: 41.211964°N 14.534569°E
- Type: Natural freshwater lake
- Basin countries: Italy
- Max. length: 255 m (837 ft)
- Max. width: 185 m (607 ft)
- Surface area: 0.049 km^{2} (0.019 sq mi)
- Surface elevation: 53.64 m (176.0 ft)

Lago di Telese is a lake in the Province of Benevento, Campania, Italy. Its surface area is 0.049 km^{2}.
