= Pago Veiano =

- Comune
- Comune di Pago Veiano
- Location within Italy Location within Campania
- Coordinates: 41°15′N 14°52′E
- Country: Italy
- Region: Campania
- Province: Benevento (BN)

Government
  - Mayor: Mauro De Ieso

Area
  - Total: 23.7 km^{2} (9.2 sq mi)
- Elevation: 485 m (1,591 ft)

Population (1 January 2020)
  - Total: 2,363
  - Density: 99.7/km^{2} (258/sq mi)
- Demonym: Pagoveianesi
- Time zone: UTC+1 (CET)
  - Summer (DST): UTC+2 (CEST)
- Postal code: 82020
- Dialing code: 0824
- ISTAT code: 062046
- Patron saint: Donatus of Arezzo
- Saint day: 7 August
- Website: Official website

Pago Veiano (Campanian: Pào) is a comune (municipality) in the Province of Benevento in the Italian region Campania, located about 70 km (43 mi) northeast of Naples and about 15 km (9.3 mi) northeast of Benevento.

Pago Veiano borders the following municipalities: Paduli, Pesco Sannita, Pietrelcina, San Giorgio La Molara, San Marco dei Cavoti.
