= Arpaise =

- Comune
- Comune di Arpaise
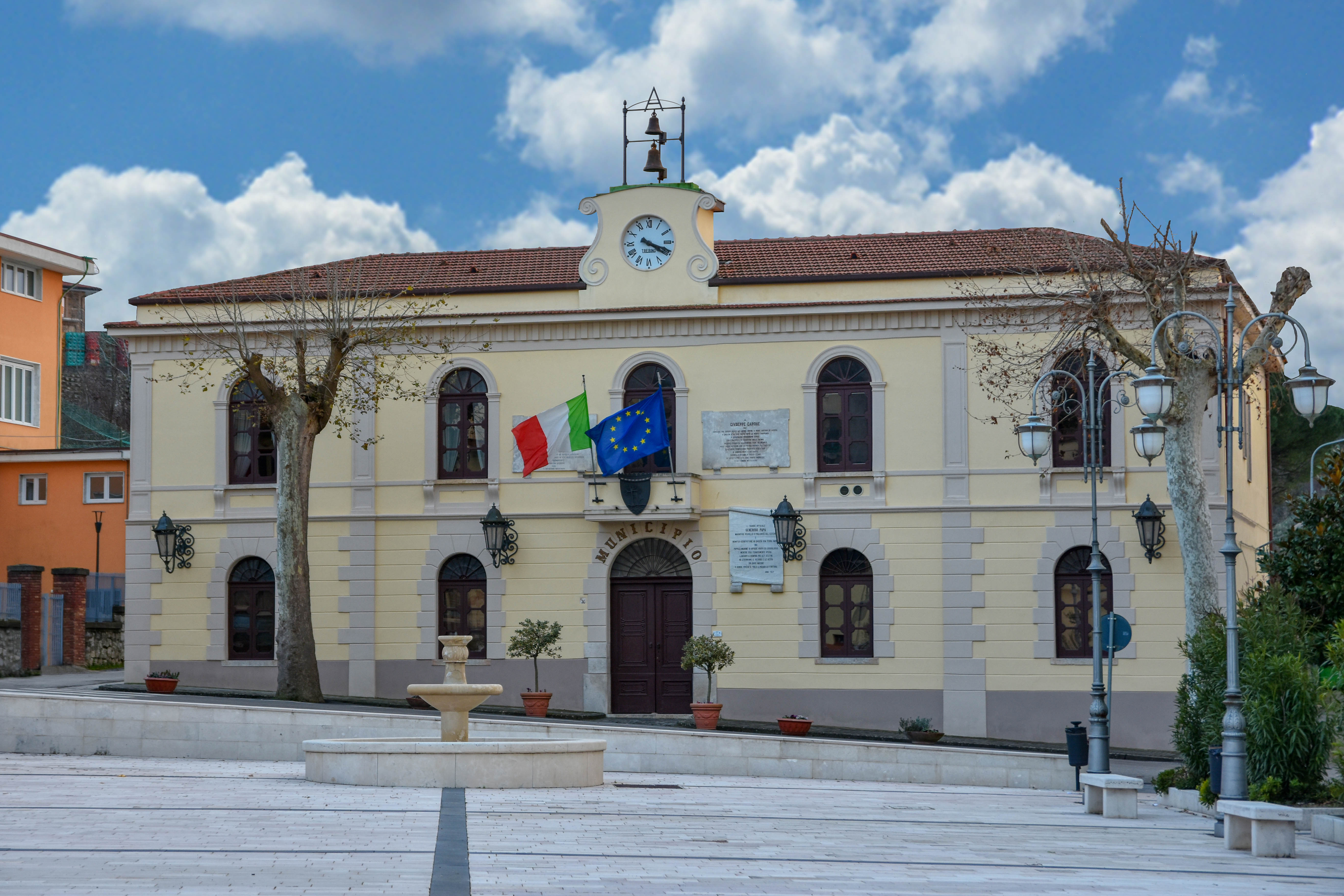

- Location within Italy Location within Campania
- Coordinates: 41°2′N 14°45′E
- Country: Italy
- Region: Campania
- Province: Benevento (BN)
- Frazioni: Mignolli, Terranova, Russi, Casalpreti

Government
  - Mayor: Vincenzo Forni Rossi

Area
  - Total: 6.66 km^{2} (2.57 sq mi)

Population (1 January 2020)
  - Total: 737
  - Density: 111/km^{2} (287/sq mi)
- Demonym: Arpaisani
- Time zone: UTC+1 (CET)
  - Summer (DST): UTC+2 (CEST)
- Postal code: 82010
- Dialing code: 0824
- ISTAT code: 062006
- Patron saint: Saint Roch
- Saint day: 16 August
- Website: Official website

Arpaise is a comune (municipality) in the Province of Benevento in the Italian region Campania, located about 50 km (31 mi) northeast of Naples and about 11 km (6.8 mi) south of Benevento.

Arpaise borders the following municipalities: Altavilla Irpina, Ceppaloni, Pietrastornina, Roccabascerana.
