= Pannarano =

- Comune
- Comune di Pannarano
- Location within Italy Location within Campania
- Coordinates: 41°1′N 14°42′E
- Country: Italy
- Region: Campania
- Province: Benevento (BN)

Government
  - Mayor: Vincenzo Pacca

Area
  - Total: 11.73 km^{2} (4.53 sq mi)

Population (1 January 2022)
  - Total: 1,981
  - Density: 168.9/km^{2} (437.4/sq mi)
- Demonym: Pannaranesi
- Time zone: UTC+1 (CET)
  - Summer (DST): UTC+2 (CEST)
- Postal code: 82017
- Dialing code: 0824
- ISTAT code: 062047
- Patron saint: John the Baptist
- Saint day: 24 June
- Website: Official website

Pannarano is a comune (municipality) in the Province of Benevento in the Italian region Campania, located about 45 kilometres (28 mi) northeast of Naples and about 15 kilometres (9.3 mi) southwest of Benevento. As of 1 January 2020, it had a population of 2,077 and an area of 11.73 square kilometres (4.53 mi^{2}).

Pannarano borders the following municipalities: Avella, Pietrastornina, Roccabascerana, San Martino Valle Caudina, Sperone, Summonte, all of them located in the Province of Avellino.

== Population evolution ==
Historical population

Year	Pop.	±%
1861	1,748	—
1871	2,251	+28.8%
1881	2,635	+17.1%
1901	2,838	+7.7%
1911	3,094	+9.0%
1921	3,095	+0.0%

Year	Pop.	±%
1931	3,163	+2.2%
1936	3,419	+8.1%
1951	3,431	+0.4%
1961	2,960	−13.7%
1971	2,262	−23.6%
1981	2,072	−8.4%

Year	Pop.	±%
1991	2,086	+0.7%
2001	2,011	−3.6%
2011	2,082	+3.5%
2021	2,024	−2.8%
2022	1,981	−2.1%

Source: Data from ISTAT
