= Pesco Sannita =

Pesco Sannita U Pièschë, U Pèscho (Neapolitan)
- Comune
- Comune di Pesco Sannita
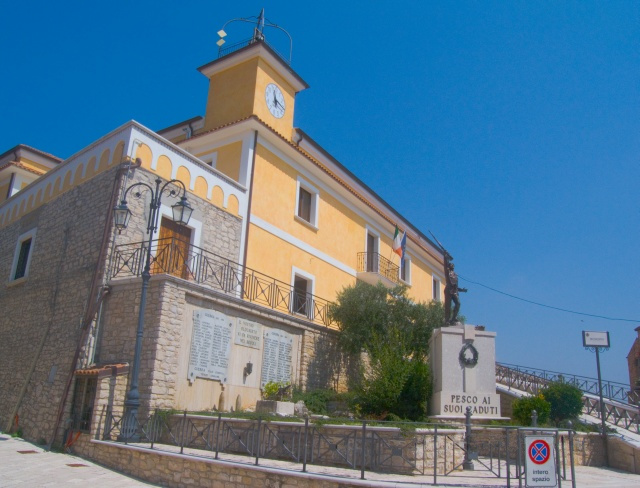
- Town hall

- Location within Italy Location within Campania
- Coordinates: 41°14′N 14°49′E
- Country: Italy
- Region: Campania
- Province: Benevento (BN)

Government
  - Mayor: Antonio Michele

Area
  - Total: 24.12 km^{2} (9.31 sq mi)
- Elevation: 393 m (1,289 ft)

Population (1 January 2020)
  - Total: 1,925
  - Density: 79.81/km^{2} (206.7/sq mi)
- Demonym: Pescolani
- Time zone: UTC+1 (CET)
  - Summer (DST): UTC+2 (CEST)
- Postal code: 82020
- Dialing code: 0824
- ISTAT code: 062050
- Patron saint: Saint Nicholas
- Saint day: 6 December
- Website: Official website

Pesco Sannita (Campanian: U Pièschë, U Pèscho) is a comune (municipality) in the Province of Benevento in the Italian region Campania, located about 70 kilometres (43 mi) northeast of Naples and about 11 kilometres (6.8 mi) north of Benevento.

Pesco Sannita borders the following municipalities: Benevento, Fragneto l'Abate, Fragneto Monforte, Pago Veiano, Pietrelcina, Reino, San Marco dei Cavoti.
