= Morcone =

- Comune
- Comune di Morcone
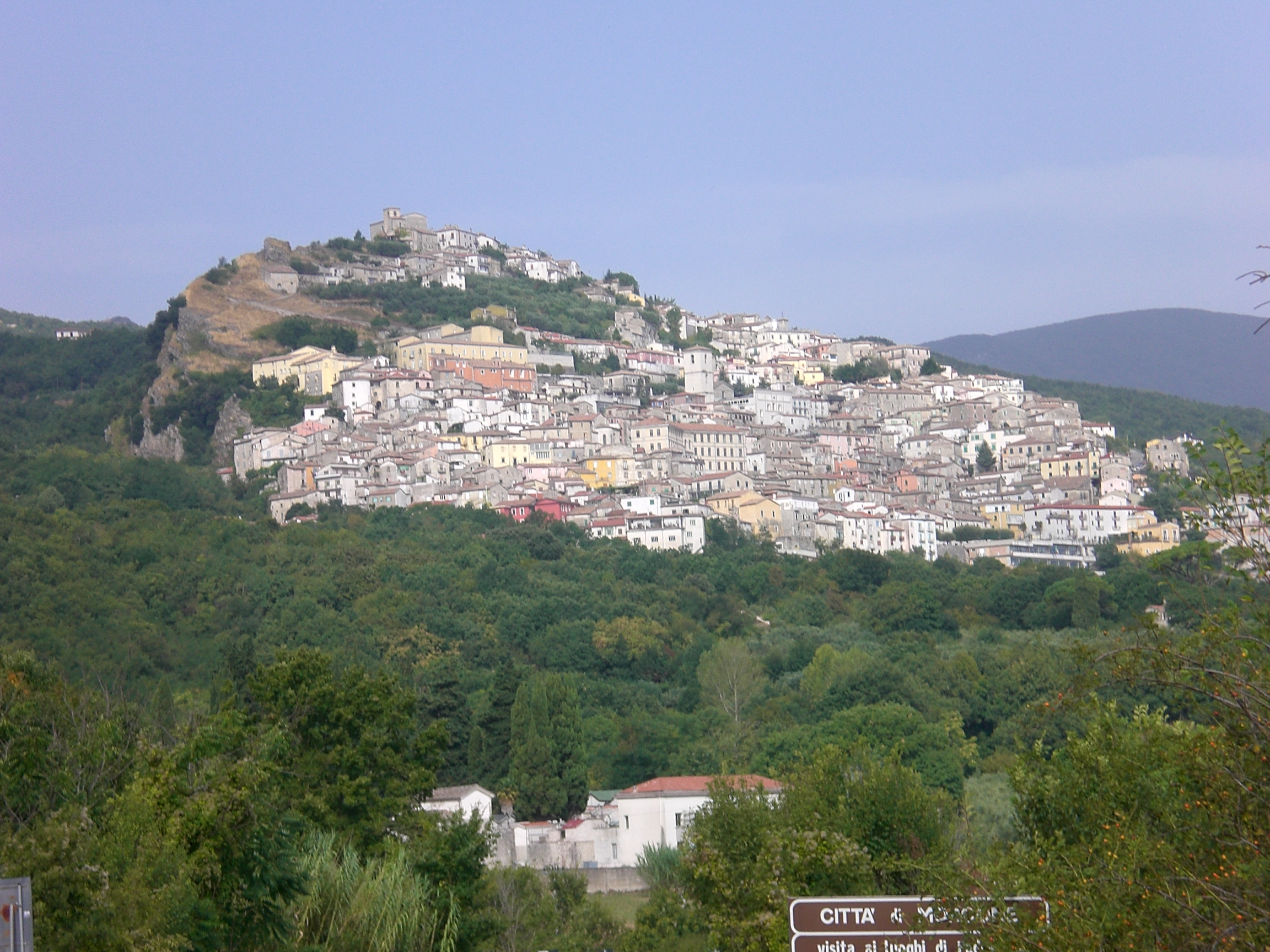
- An aerial view of the town of Morcone in the Matese Mountains

- Coat of arms

- Location within Italy Location within Campania
- Coordinates: 41°20′N 14°40′E
- Country: Italy
- Region: Campania
- Province: Benevento (BN)
- Frazioni: Bochicchi, Canepino Piscone, Colle Alto, Colle di Serra, Colonia Casetta, Coste, Cuffiano, Fiorenza, Fontana Vetica, Fosana, Galli, Giambellardini, Laici, Macchia, Montagna, Monti, Morcone Scalo, Piana, Piano Viola, Pontepescosardo, Ponte Stretto, Selvapiana, Solla, Stautieri, Torre, Zeoli

Government
  - Mayor: Lugino Ciarlo

Area
  - Total: 101.33 km^{2} (39.12 sq mi)
- Elevation: 680 m (2,230 ft)

Population (1 January 2020)
  - Total: 4,744
  - Density: 46.82/km^{2} (121.3/sq mi)
- Demonym: Morconesi
- Time zone: UTC+1 (CET)
  - Summer (DST): UTC+2 (CEST)
- Postal code: 82026
- Dialing code: 0824
- ISTAT code: 062044
- Patron saint: St. Bernardino of Siena
- Saint day: 20 May
- Website: Official website

Morcone is a comune (municipality) in the Province of Benevento in the Italian region Campania, located about 70 km northeast of Naples and about 25 km northwest of Benevento. The villages (Contrade) of Morcone include: Canepino, Cuffiano, Coste, Torre, Fuschi, Piana.

Morcone borders the following municipalities: Campolattaro, Cercemaggiore, Cerreto Sannita, Circello, Pietraroja, Pontelandolfo, Santa Croce del Sannio, Sassinoro, Sepino.

== Geography ==
Morcone is reachable by train from Benevento or Campobasso. By car, it is reachable from the SS 87 state road (Sannitica) that connects Naples in Campobasso. The nearest airport is Naples. The town is perched in the Matese mountains, on the steep slopes of Mount Mucre, overlooking the valley of the Tammaro River. The etymology of the name comes from Mount Mucre, which has evolved and later becoming Mucrone and then Morcone.

== History ==
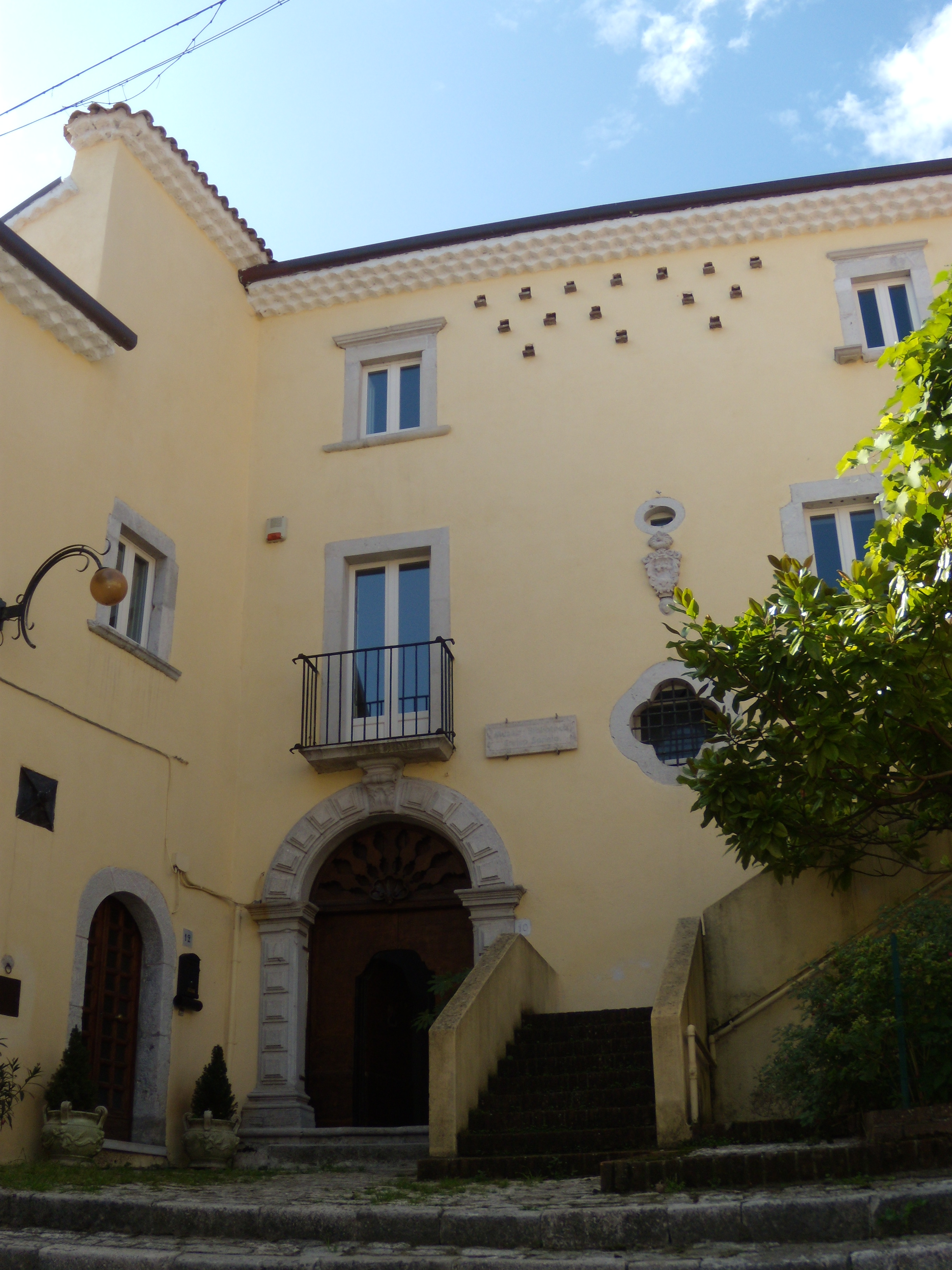
Casa Sannia, Morcone's library and museum.

Modern Morcone was founded upon an old Samnite settlement, most likely the village of "Mucre". Remains of the village still exist today, including a fortified polygonal enclosure (dating from the fifth or sixth century BC) which was later used as foundation for castle walls.

The town was mentioned for the first time in 776 AD when it was the seat of a Lombard gastald.

From 1058 to 1122, Morcone served as a diocese of the Catholic church.

In 1122 appeared the first mention of the castle where Count Giordano of Ariano took refuge after defeat by the Norman.

Under Roger II of Sicily, Morcone became royal property and was equipped with municipal statutes conferred by Margaret of Durazzo.

After the abolition of feudalism in 1806, the fiefs of Gaetani, Carafa, D'Aponte and Baglioni became part of the Contando of Molise and, in 1861, the province of Benevento.

Morcone played a role in the formative years of Roman Catholic Saint Padre Pio.

== Main sights ==
=== Town center ===
The historic center of Morcone is spread out like a fan across a hill, with the castle remains at the summit. There are many narrow, winding streets and steps between the houses in the town.

The earthquake of 1980 damaged many urban buildings. The church of Saint Marc and town hall were subsequently renovated, bringing more modern architectural styles to the town.

The San Marco gate is the only city gate that remains today.

=== Castle and Samnite ruins ===
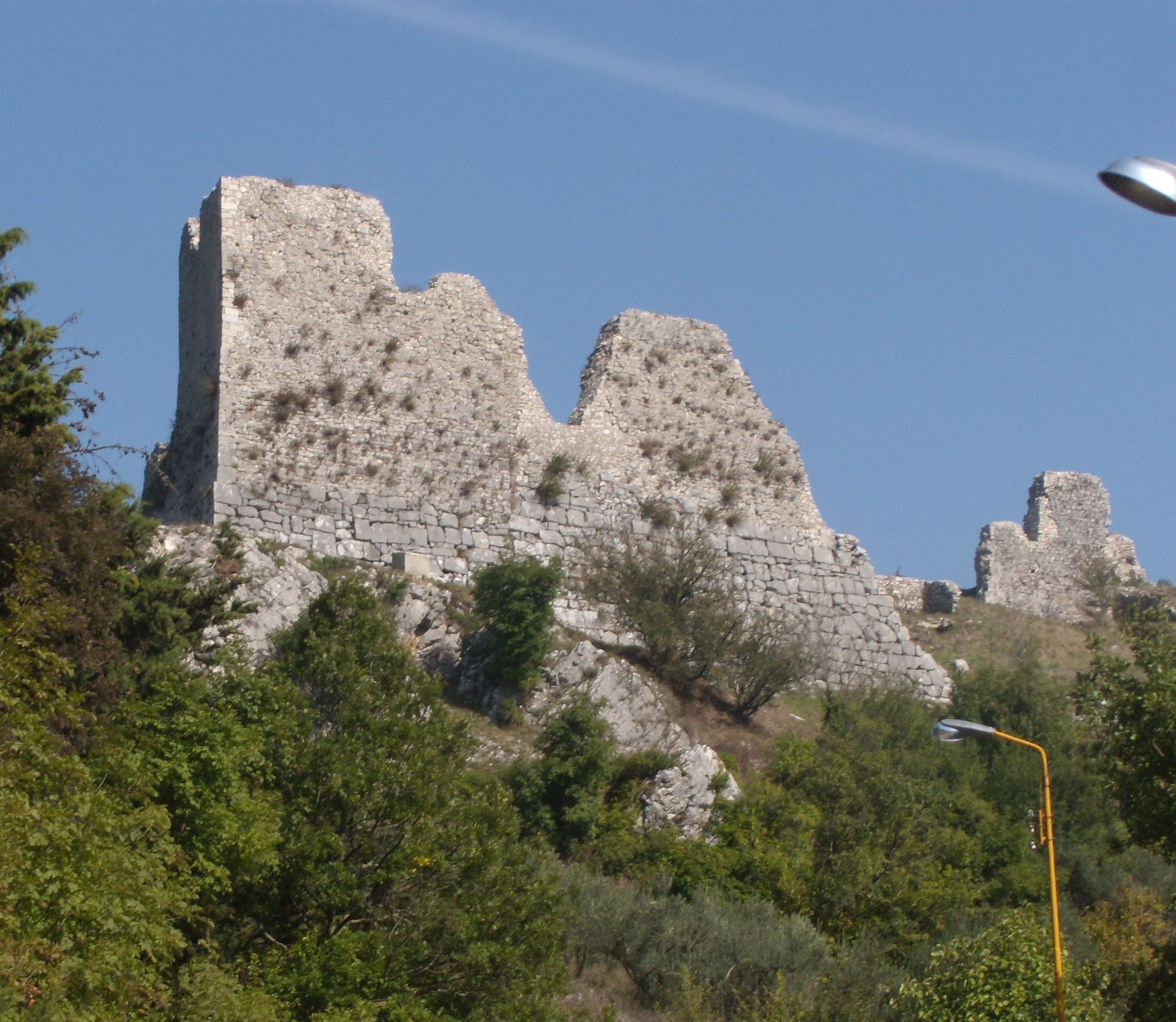
The remains of the castle

The castle sits at the summit of the town hilltop, strategically dominating the surrounding landscape. The castle was probably built in the tenth century, although the first documented references date back to 1122.

The ruins of the castle, mostly consisting of sections of perimeter walls, show that it had been built upon a Sunnite settlement. The foundation is made of polygonal stone blocks, a feature common to all Samnite fortified structures.

The entrance to the fortress, consisting of a portal with a pointed arch, still remains today.

== Other sights ==
- Walls of the Samnite era (4th century BC)

== Twin towns ==
- Penela, Portugal

== Sources ==
- Lorenzo, Piombo (2003). ArcheoClub Morcone (ed.). Sedile Universitatis: il complesso civico dell'Universitas di Morcone nel borgo medievale e moderno.
