= Pietrelcina =

Pietrelcina Pretapucìna (Neapolitan)
- Comune
- Comune di Pietrelcina
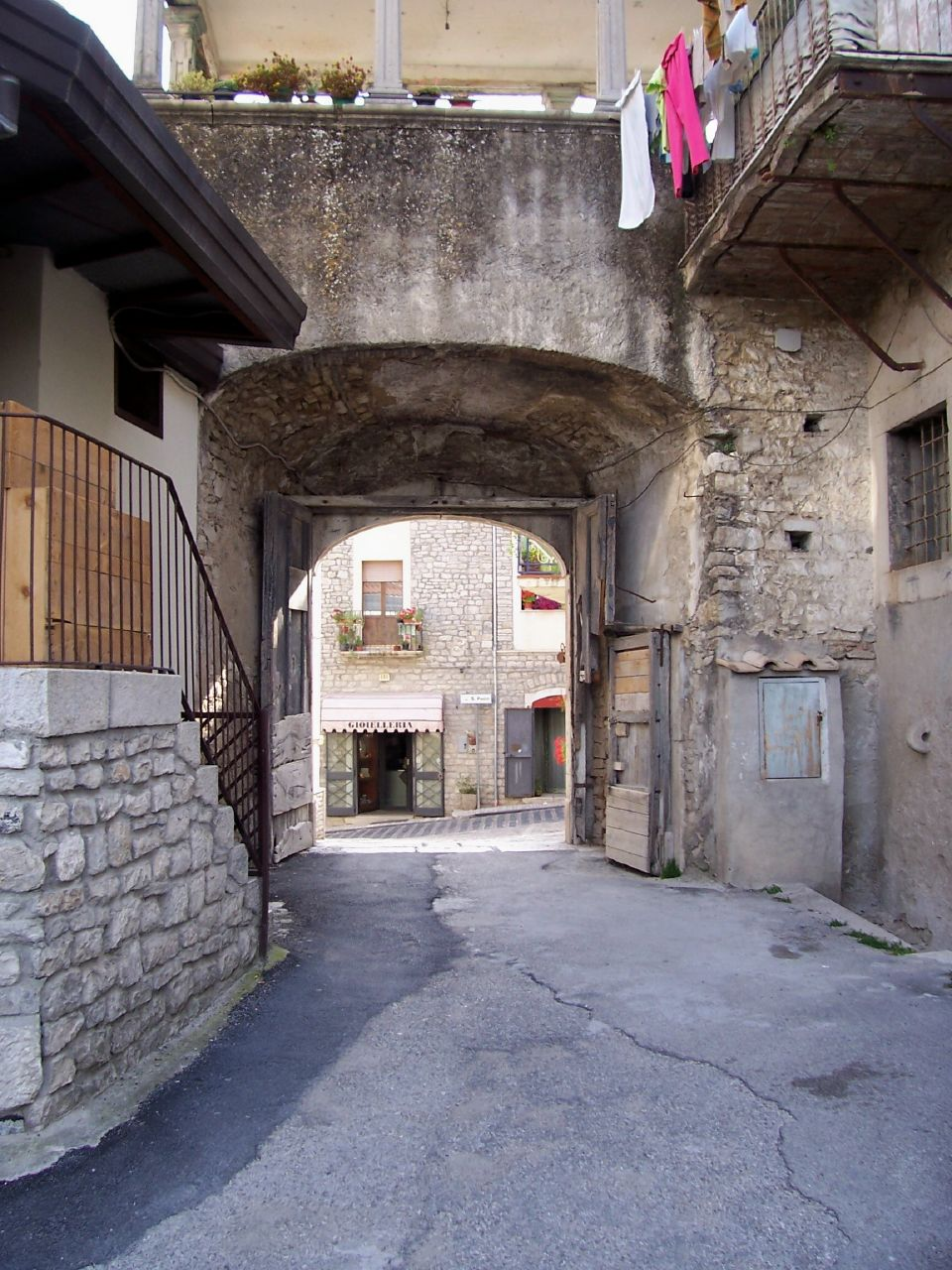
- A street in Pietrelcina

- Location within Italy Location within Campania
- Coordinates: 41°12′N 14°51′E
- Country: Italy
- Region: Campania
- Province: Benevento (BN)
- Frazioni: Piana Romana, Stazione

Government
  - Mayor: Domenico Masone

Area
  - Total: 28.77 km^{2} (11.11 sq mi)
- Elevation: 345 m (1,132 ft)

Population (1 January 2020)
  - Total: 2,996
  - Density: 104.1/km^{2} (269.7/sq mi)
- Demonym: Pietrelcinesi
- Time zone: UTC+1 (CET)
  - Summer (DST): UTC+2 (CEST)
- Postal code: 82020
- Dialing code: 0824
- ISTAT code: 062052
- Patron saint: Madonna della Libera
- Saint day: 3 December
- Website: Official website

Pietrelcina (Neapolitan: Pretapucìna) is a town and comune (municipality) in the province of Benevento in the Campania region of southern Italy. It is the birthplace of Saint Pio of Pietrelcina, better known as Padre Pio.

== Geography ==
Benevento, Paduli, Pago Veiano and Pesco Sannita are neighbouring towns.

== International relations ==
Pietrelcina is twinned with:

- San Giovanni Rotondo, Italy
- Bethlehem, Palestine
- Wadowice, Poland, since 2006
