= Fragneto Monforte =

- Comune
- Comune di Fragneto Monforte
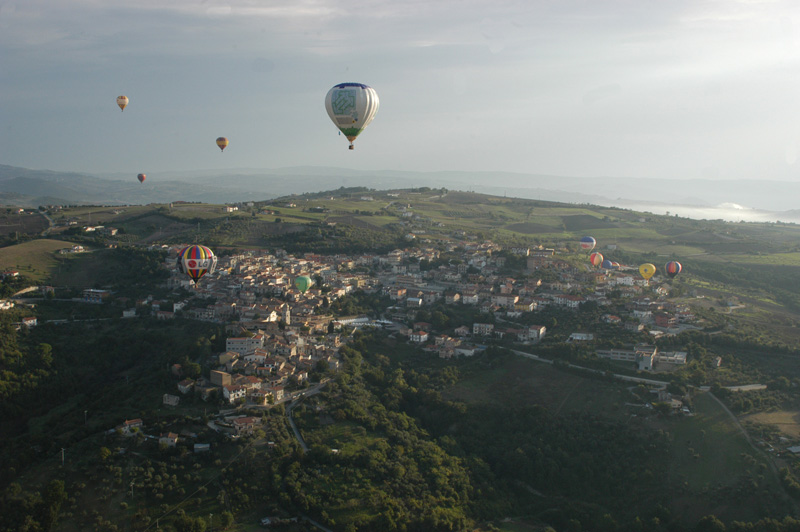
- View of Fragneto during the Hot Air Balloon Festival.

- Location within Italy Location within Campania
- Coordinates: 41°15′N 14°46′E
- Country: Italy
- Region: Campania
- Province: Benevento (BN)

Government
  - Mayor: Raffaele Caputo

Area
  - Total: 24.4 km^{2} (9.4 sq mi)
- Elevation: 380 m (1,250 ft)

Population (1 January 2020)
  - Total: 1,764
  - Density: 72.3/km^{2} (187/sq mi)
- Demonym: Fragnetani
- Time zone: UTC+1 (CET)
  - Summer (DST): UTC+2 (CEST)
- Postal code: 82020
- Dialing code: 0824
- ISTAT code: 062034
- Patron saint: Nicholas of Bari
- Saint day: 6 December
- Website: Official website

Fragneto Monforte is a comune (municipality) in the Province of Benevento in the Italian region Campania.

Fragneto is a green mountainous area whose history dates back from 500 BC. It is 10 km from Benevento, 65 km from Naples, and 200 km from Rome.

Fragneto Monforte borders the following municipalities: Benevento, Campolattaro, Casalduni, Fragneto l'Abate, Pesco Sannita, Ponte, Pontelandolfo, Torrecuso.

== History ==
Due to its strategic position, since 500 BC, Fragneto Monforte was a very important center for Sanniti, Romans, Goths, Byzantines, Muslims, and Lombards. The name Fragneto comes from "Fara" (family) of "Gnito", a Lombard warrior who founded the "castrum", (the fortified village) around the 11th century AD.

In the 10th century BC, units of Byzantines escaped from Benevento and settled in Fragneto, introducing the cult of Saint Nicholas of Myra which is still today practised. In 1010 appears the common noun Monteforte that will be turned in Monforte during the 17th century.

In the Norman period (1150–1168) Fragneto Monforte is often named among the feudal overloads, in fact in the first half of the 12th century it belonged to Bartolomeo from Monteforte. This family, during the period of Angiò, succeeded in enlarging their properties and above all in conserving them for more than three centuries.

In the 14th and 15th centuries Fragneto Monforte lives tragic events: first the terrible earthquake of 1349, then the occupation of the Aragonesi, the reconquest of the Angioini and finally the other earthquake on Saint Barbara's night in 1456, that destroyed the country.

With the arrival of Carl VIII, king of France, to monforte, for the first time is hoisted the French flag. After the French defeat the dominion and the power of Monforte ceased; his possession was given to Federico d'Aragona e Andrea di Capua. During the following 90 years the earldom of Fragneto will be sold other five times. In 1584 it will belong to the family Montalto that in 1612 will receive the title of Duke of Fragneto. To the heirs of Montalto family belongs today the Palazzo Ducale.

== Main sights ==
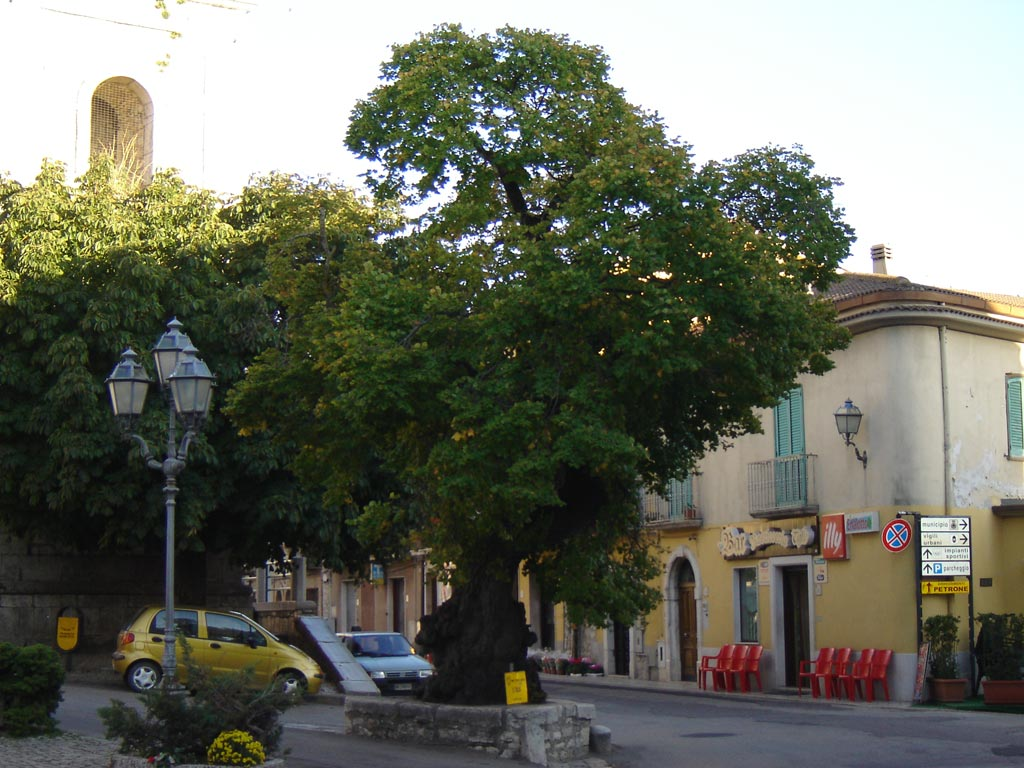
The Tiglio tree

The main monuments in Fragneto are: the Palazzo ducale, home of Montalto family for over 400 years and elegantly restored and refinished. Today it is a luxury venue for special events such as conferences, parties and weddings.

The Parish Church of SS Nicola and Rocco, destroyed by the earthquake of 1688 and rebuilt the following century. In the church there is the relic of Santa Faustina, martyr during the dominion of emperor Diocletian, dating back to the 3rd century AD. This church took the place of the older Santa Croce Church, completely destroyed by the same earthquake and whose restoration has recently been done.

The Bell Tower built between the 17th-18th centuries; it is separated from the church to rise in the main square. Similar to that also the tiglio, the tree symbol of the village, rises on the main square. It dates back to the end of 16th century.

== Cuisine ==
The typical foods of Fragneto area include: hand made pasta (cavatelli, fusilli), ewe's milk cheese, wines and oil all of controlled origin. However most products that enrich the gastronomy in this area can be related to an artistic and qualitative craftsmanship: from "zeppole" and "struffoli" to the vaste range of charcuterie, capocollo, soppressate, sausages, beefs and pork.

Traditional craft techniques of wicker, wood and wrought iron, pottery and lace are still used to create Fragneto handicrafts.

== Hot air balloon festival ==
The Hot air balloon festival takes place in October. It began more than 20 years ago and it is promoted by the administration and "Pro- Loco". Both Italian and foreign crews take part, and the meeting is not only a sporting event, but also an important cultural meeting, due to the presence of famous representatives of the arts and culture. Its main aim is to promote the exploitation of Fragneto's and Samnium's agricultural, cultural and handicraft resources, to allow the knowledge and peace among different races and cultures.

During the festival, in the town there are a lot of exhibitions and expositions of folklore, music, art, local handicrafts, typical products and cultural meetings.
