= Paduli =

- Comune
- Comune di Paduli
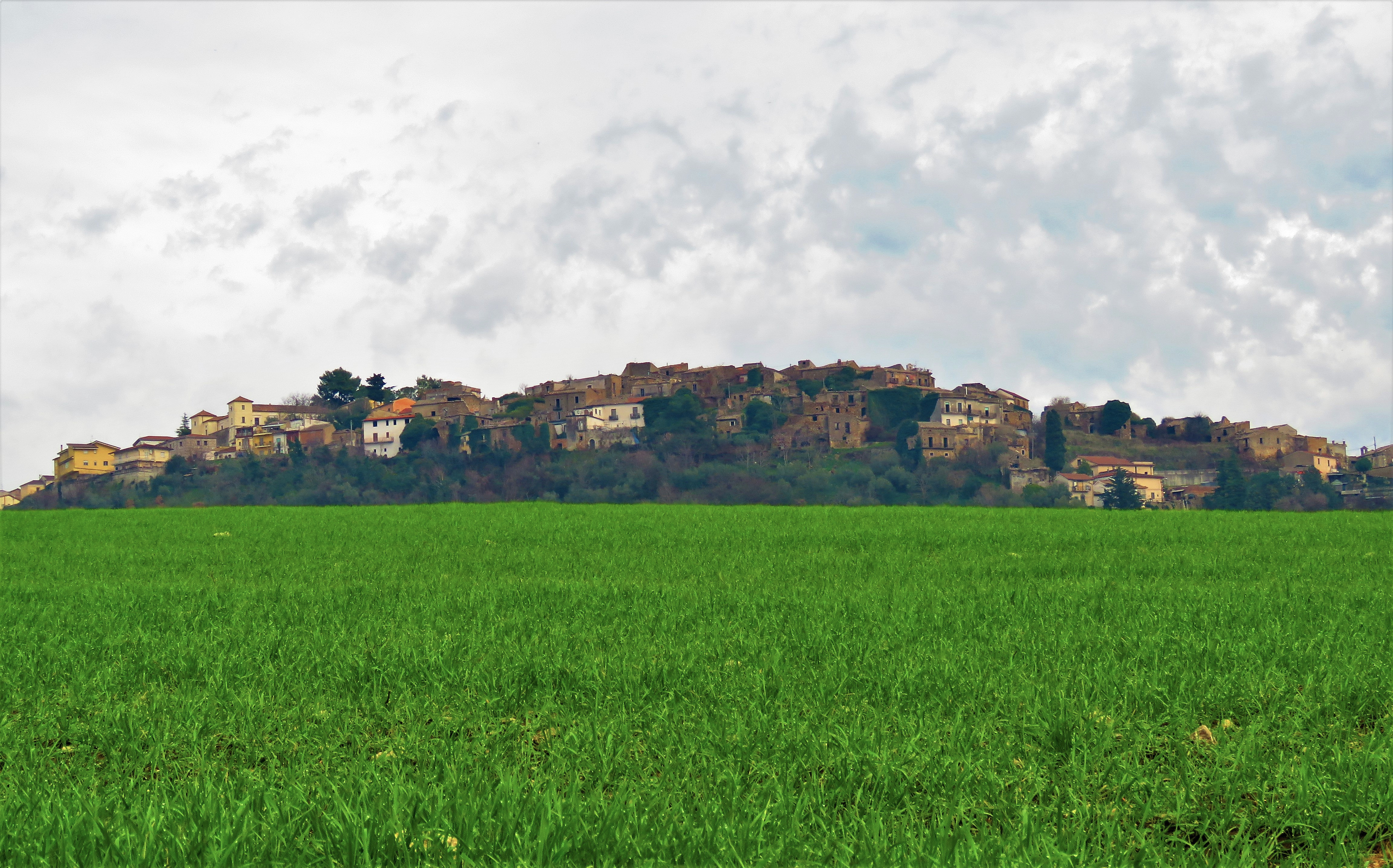
- Skyline of Paduli

- Location within Italy Location within Campania
- Coordinates: 41°10′N 14°53′E
- Country: Italy
- Region: Campania
- Province: Benevento (BN)
- First mentioned: c. 92 AD
- Frazioni: Bosco Verdito, Calore Sandriano, Ignazio Forno Nuovo, Monte Capriano Carpinelli, Orticelli, Orticelli Montefollo, Piana, Piana Ferrara, Ravano, Saglieta, San Giuseppe, Serre Capitolo, Soloni, Torre

Government
  - Mayor: Domenico Vessichelli

Area
  - Total: 44.73 km^{2} (17.27 sq mi)
- Elevation: 320 m (1,050 ft)

Population (1 January 2020)
  - Total: 3,819
  - Density: 85.38/km^{2} (221.1/sq mi)
- Demonym: Padulesi
- Time zone: UTC+1 (CET)
  - Summer (DST): UTC+2 (CEST)
- Postal code: 82020
- Dialing code: 0824
- ISTAT code: 062045
- Patron saint: Saint Nicholas
- Saint day: 6 December
- Website: Official website

Paduli is a comune (municipality) in the Province of Benevento in the Italian region Campania. It is located on a rocky spur between the Calore and Tammaro rivers, about 60 km (37 mi) northeast of Naples and about 9 km (5.6 mi) northeast of Benevento.

== Etymology ==
It is theorized that Paduli was the ancient Roman settlement of Batulum. The most likely theory regarding the origin of the name "Paduli" proposes the name "Batulum" changed to "Padulum", which in Vulgar Latin meant "marsh". It is from "padulem" that the Italian term "padule" - the plural form of which is "paduli" - is derived. Indeed, the identification of Paduli as Batulum comes from the similarly hilled and swampy environment both areas are known to have occupied, and the earliest confirmed mention of Paduli records the town's name as "Padule". Furthermore, the Italian settlement of Colle Sannita, around 10 miles from Paduli, preserves an ancient name for the general area of Benevento it occupies called "Padula" - which also means "marsh" or "swamp".

It is also possible that Paduli originated from the declined genitive form of Batulum – Batulī.

== History ==
The history of Paduli is largely unclear. Two theories exist about Paduli's origins. The first postulates Paduli was formed by medieval Romans fleeing Forum Novum during an era of barbarian invasions. Paduli is located in what was once the territory allocated to the Bebians, a group of 40,000 Apuan Ligures. The Roman Empire had exiled these people from Liguria for allegedly being conspirators, and as a result they began travelling south, establishing villages along the Tammaro River, such as Campolattaro, Santa Croce del Sannio, and Circello, as they went. When Saracen invasions took place between the 8th and 11th century, people who lived along the Tammaro in easily accessible areas sought shelter by escaping into areas not easily accessible and more defensible. Paduli would likely be such an area, especially since at this point in time Paduli's familial nobility, the Mesano family, owned tenements along the Tammaro and would benefit from the people's being protected. With the arrival of the Normans some time later, such a small inhabited center, when fortified and expanded, had an unbeatable military strategic position.

The second theory of Paduli's origins comes from several historians, such as Domenico Romanelli, who postulate Paduli was once the ancient city of Batulum, built by the ancient Samnites. "Batulum" is first mentioned along with other localities in Samnium, in book seven of Virgil’s Aeneid:

"Nec tu carminibus nostris indictus abibis, Oebale, quem generasse Telon Sebethide nympha fertur, Teleboum Capreas cum regna teneret, iam senior; patriis sed non et filius arvis contentus late iam tum dicione premebat Sarrastis populos et quae rigat aequora Sarnus quique Rufras Batulumque tenent atque arva Celemnae et quos maliferae despectant moenia Abellae, Teutonico ritu soliti torquere cateias, tegmina quis capitum raptus de subere cortex, aerataeque micant peltae, micat aereus ensis."

"Nor shalt thou, Oebalus, depart unsung, whom minstrels say the nymph Sebethis bore to Telon, who in Capri was a king when old and gray; but that disdaining son quitted so small a seat, and conquering sway among Sarrastian folk and those wide plains watered by Sarnus' wave, became a king over Celenna, Rufrae, Batulum, and where among her apple-orchards rise Abella's walls. All these, as Teutons use, hurl a light javelin; for helm they wear stripped cork-tree bark; the crescent of their shields is gleaming bronze, and gleaming bronze the sword.

Batulum is mentioned again in the eighth book of the Punica by Silius Italicus, although its exact location is never described.

"Adfuit et Samnis, nondum uergente fauore ad Poenos, sed nec ueteri purgatus ab ira: qui Batulum Nucrasque metunt, Bouiania quique exagitant lustra aut Caudinis faucibus haerent, et quos aut Rufrae, quos aut Aesernia, quosque obscura incultis Herdonia misit ab agris."

"The Samnites too there were; their allegiance was not yet turning towards the Carthaginians, but they still cherished their ancient grudge. Here were the reapers of Batulum and Nucrae, the hunters of Bovianum, the dwellers in the gorge of Caudium, and those whom Rufrae or Aesernia or unknown Herdonia sent from her untilled fields."

Supporting this theory are the mentions of the river Sarno, and settlements Rufrae/Rufras (modern Raviscanina/Presenzano), Bovianum (modern Bojano), Caudium (modern Montesarchio), Herdonia (modern Ordona), Avella (modern Abella), and Aesernia (modern Isernia), all of which remain within very close proximity of Paduli, some lying less than a mile away from the modern town.

Still, there are some challenges to this theory. Excavations at Forum Novum revealed a series of inscriptions bearing the names of settlements along the Roman road Via Traiana. Paduli is not among the settlements listed, despite the Via Traiana passing right through the town. This suggests that Paduli proper wasn't established yet. Supporting the other prevalent theory regarding Paduli, what excavations at Forum Novum did reveal were ruins certainly attributed to the 'pagvs', or Roman villa owners, during the Bebian period along the Tammaro. Additionally, Batulum's existence, let alone its location, has failed to be determined. Virgil's accounts of Batulum indicate confusion and errors, unlike other urban centers mentioned in his works. Another thing that creates incongruity is the illogical nature of the Samnites building a town on the peak of an unpaved hillside with no natural springs, other urban centers in Samnium developed in flat areas along main roads and large trade routes, such as Cluvia, and Aequum Tuticum (the modern day settlement of Sant'Eleuterio between Ariano Irpino and Castelfranco in Miscano) which are located not far away from modern Paduli.

Regardless, the confirmed first written mention of Paduli comes from a diploma confirming the sovereignty of Conrad II of Germany, where it is listed as "Padule". In 1113, Falco of Benevento described Paduli as the site of an immense fortified castle built by Normans to help facilitate attacks against Benevento. The castle was later destroyed by Benevento's constable, Landolfo della Greca.

After the end of Avegin rule, Paduli was part of territory split amongst many noble families, including the Cybo, the Patinelli, the Caricciolo families. In 1726, this territory was sold to the Coscia family, who built a palace to the De Vivo family in the ruins of the castle that once housed the counts of Ariano.

From the 1890s onward, Paduli saw a wave of immigration to the United States. The majority of emigrated Padulesi settled in Nassau County, New York, namely Glen Cove, Oyster Bay, and Locust Valley. A number of Padulesi also settled in Brooklyn.

In modern times, the historical district of Paduli, abandoned in the mid-twentieth century, remains largely dilapidated and still referred to as "Batulum"

== Twin towns and sister cities ==
- Oyster Bay, New York, United States
- Campbelltown, South Australia, Australia
