= Paolisi =

- Comune
- Comune di Paolisi
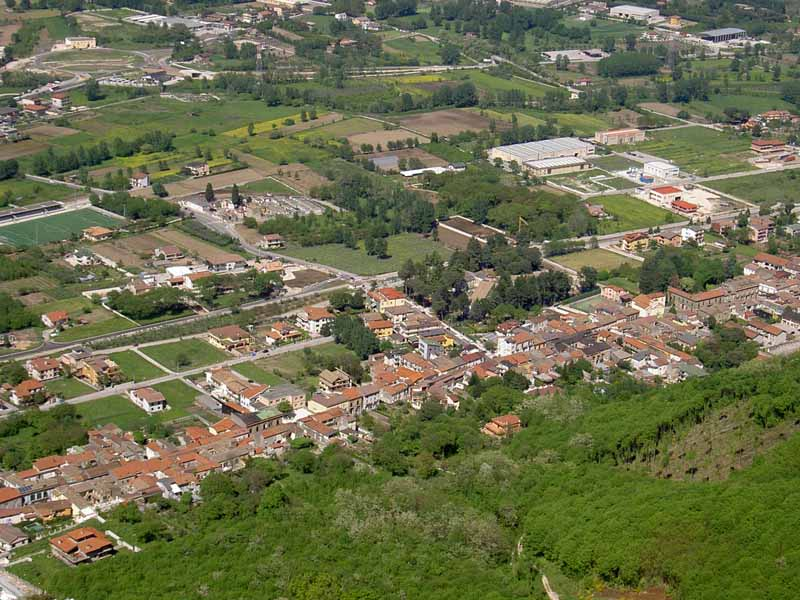

- Coat of arms

- Location within Italy Location within Campania
- Coordinates: 41°2′N 14°35′E
- Country: Italy
- Region: Campania
- Province: Benevento (BN)

Government
  - Mayor: Umberto Maietta

Area
  - Total: 6.07 km^{2} (2.34 sq mi)
- Elevation: 270 m (890 ft)

Population (1 January 2020)
  - Total: 2,052
  - Density: 338/km^{2} (876/sq mi)
- Demonym: Paolisani
- Time zone: UTC+1 (CET)
  - Summer (DST): UTC+2 (CEST)
- Postal code: 82011
- Dialing code: 0823
- ISTAT code: 062048
- Patron saint: Andrew the Apostle
- Saint day: 30 November
- Website: Official website

Paolisi is a comune (municipality) in the Province of Benevento in the Italian region Campania, located about 35 km northeast of Naples and about 20 km southwest of Benevento.
