= Fragneto l'Abate =

- Comune
- Comune di Fragneto l'Abate
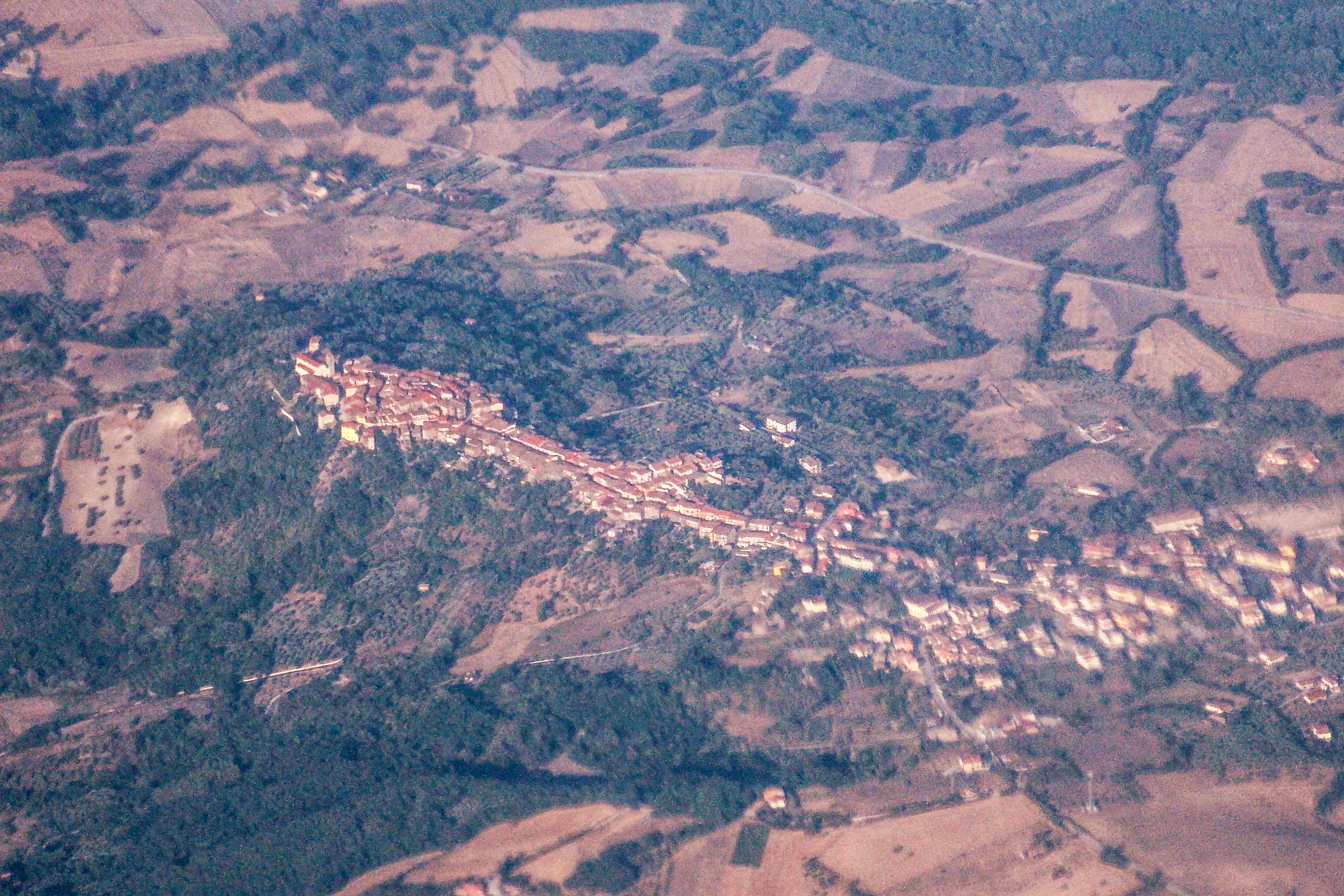

- Coat of arms

- Location within Italy Location within Campania
- Coordinates: 41°16′N 14°47′E
- Country: Italy
- Region: Campania
- Province: Benevento (BN)
- Frazioni: San Matteo

Government
  - Mayor: Lucio Mucciacciaro

Area
  - Total: 20.57 km^{2} (7.94 sq mi)
- Elevation: 501 m (1,644 ft)

Population (1 January 2020)
  - Total: 1,006
  - Density: 48.91/km^{2} (126.7/sq mi)
- Demonym: Fragnetellesi
- Time zone: UTC+1 (CET)
  - Summer (DST): UTC+2 (CEST)
- Postal code: 82020
- Dialing code: 0824
- ISTAT code: 062033
- Patron saint: Anthony of Padua
- Saint day: 13 June
- Website: Official website

Fragneto l'Abate (Campanian: Frannitiélle; locally Fràgnitièllo) is a comune (municipality) in the Province of Benevento in the Italian region Campania, located about 70 kilometres (43 mi) northeast of Naples and about 15 kilometres (9.3 mi) north of Benevento.

Fragneto l'Abate borders the following municipalities: Campolattaro, Circello, Fragneto Monforte, Pesco Sannita, Reino.
