= Reino, Campania =

Reino
- Comune
- Comune di Reino
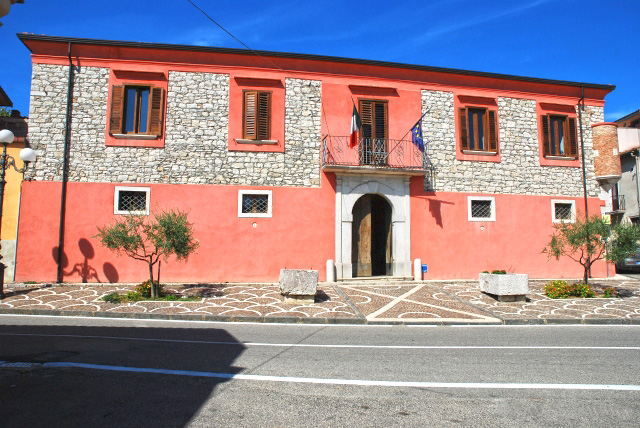
- Town hall

- Location within Italy Location within Campania
- Coordinates: 41°17′N 14°49′E
- Country: Italy
- Region: Campania
- Province: Benevento (BN)

Government
  - Mayor: Antonio Calzone

Area
  - Total: 23.59 km^{2} (9.11 sq mi)
- Elevation: 450 m (1,480 ft)

Population (1 November 2023)
  - Total: 1,085
  - Density: 45.99/km^{2} (119.1/sq mi)
- Demonym: Reinesi
- Time zone: UTC+1 (CET)
  - Summer (DST): UTC+2 (CEST)
- Postal code: 82020
- Dialing code: 0824
- ISTAT code: 062056
- Patron saint: Saint Anthony
- Saint day: 13 June
- Website: Official website

Reino is a comune (municipality) in the Province of Benevento in the Italian region Campania, located about 70 km northeast of Naples and about 15 km north of Benevento. As of 1 November 2023, it had a population of 1,085 and an area of 23.59 km^{2}.

Reino borders the following municipalities: Circello, Colle Sannita, Fragneto l'Abate, Pesco Sannita, San Marco dei Cavoti.
