= Colle Sannita =

- Comune
- Comune di Colle Sannita
- Location within Italy Location within Campania
- Coordinates: 41°22′N 14°50′E
- Country: Italy
- Region: Campania
- Province: Benevento (BN)
- Frazioni: Decorata

Government
  - Mayor: Michele Iapozzuto

Area
  - Total: 37.28 km^{2} (14.39 sq mi)
- Elevation: 720 m (2,360 ft)

Population (1 January 2020)
  - Total: 2,239
  - Density: 60.06/km^{2} (155.6/sq mi)
- Demonym: Collesi
- Time zone: UTC+1 (CET)
  - Summer (DST): UTC+2 (CEST)
- Postal code: 82024
- Dialing code: 0824
- ISTAT code: 062025
- Patron saint: Saint George
- Website: Official website

Colle Sannita (Campanian: Ro Còllë) is a comune (municipality) in the Province of Benevento in the Italian region Campania, located about 80 kilometres (50 mi) northeast of Naples and about 25 kilometres (16 mi) north of Benevento.

Colle Sannita borders the following municipalities: Baselice, Castelpagano, Castelvetere in Val Fortore, Circello, Reino, Riccia, San Marco dei Cavoti.
