= Pietrastornina =

- Comune
- Comune di Pietrastornina
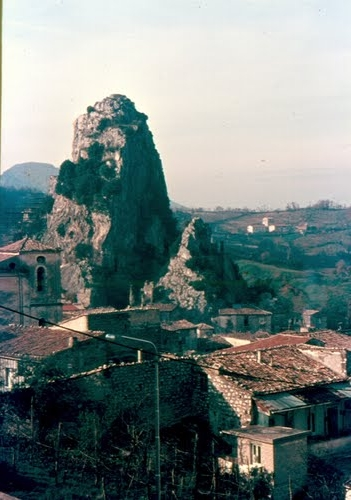
- The Rocky Spire of Pietrastornina

- Location within Italy Location within Campania
- Coordinates: 41°0′N 14°44′E
- Country: Italy
- Region: Campania
- Province: Avellino (AV)

Government
  - Mayor: Amato Rizzo

Area
  - Total: 15 km^{2} (5.8 sq mi)
- Elevation: 513 m (1,683 ft)

Population (31 December 2010)
  - Total: 1,567
  - Density: 100/km^{2} (270/sq mi)
- Demonym: Pietrastorninesi
- Time zone: UTC+1 (CET)
  - Summer (DST): UTC+2 (CEST)
- Postal code: 83015
- Dialing code: 0825
- Website: Official website

Pietrastornina (Campanian: A Prèta) is a town and comune in the province of Avellino, Campania, southern Italy.

== Notable residents ==
- Matteo Piantedosi (born 1963), Italian Minister of the Interior: born in his mother's Naples and raised in his father's Pietrastornina, where he retained a house and was made an honorary citizen
