= Campolattaro =

- Comune
- Comune di Campolattaro
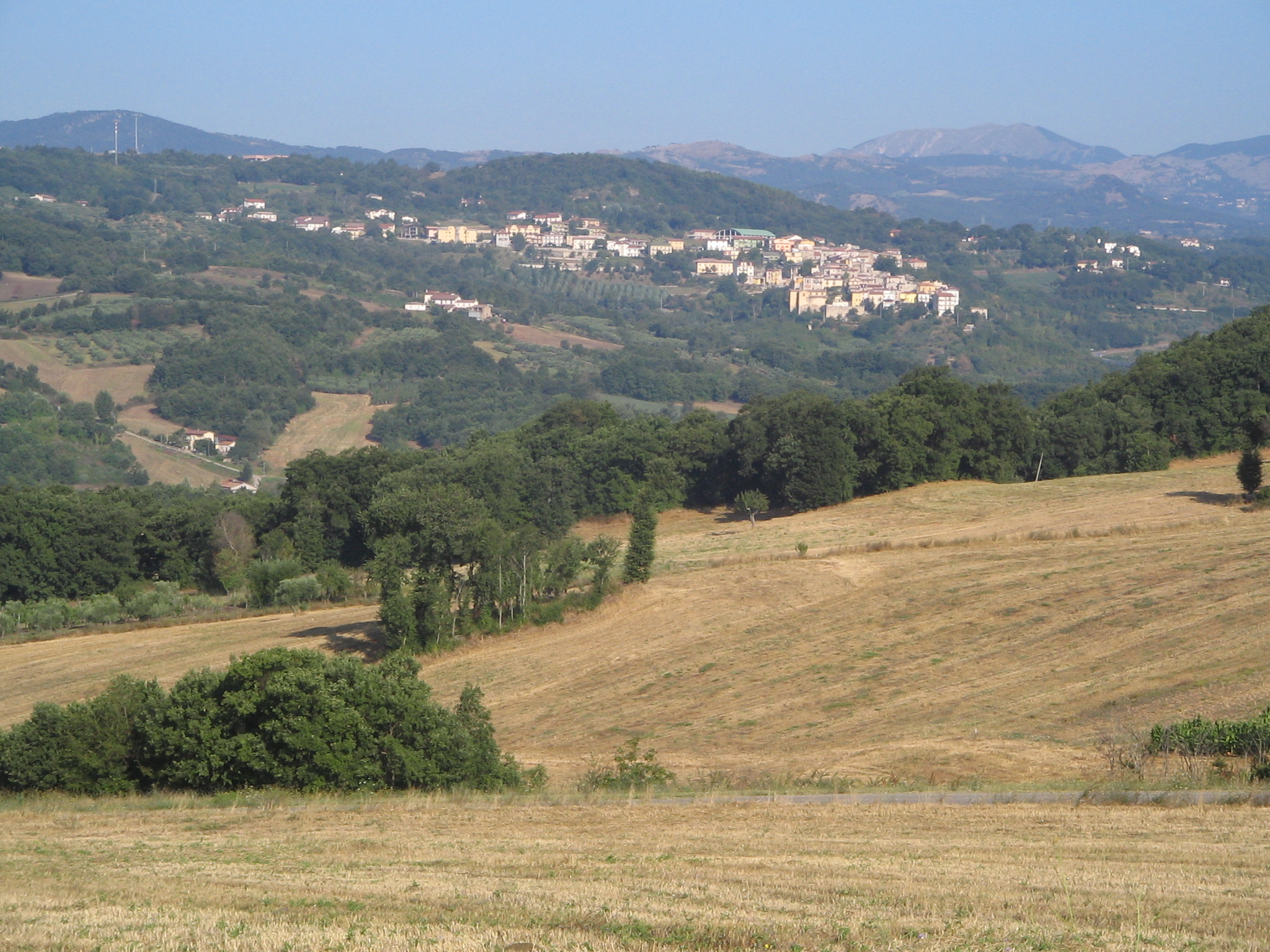

- Location within Italy Location within Campania
- Coordinates: 41°17′N 14°44′E
- Country: Italy
- Region: Campania
- Province: Benevento (BN)
- Frazioni: Iadanza

Government
  - Mayor: Pasquale Narciso

Area
  - Total: 17.5 km^{2} (6.8 sq mi)
- Elevation: 430 m (1,410 ft)
- Highest elevation: 572 m (1,877 ft)
- Lowest elevation: 322 m (1,056 ft)

Population (1 January 2020)
  - Total: 995
  - Density: 56.9/km^{2} (147/sq mi)
- Demonym: Campolattaresi
- Time zone: UTC+1 (CET)
  - Summer (DST): UTC+2 (CEST)
- Postal code: 82020
- Dialing code: 0824
- ISTAT code: 062013
- Patron saint: St. Sebastian
- Saint day: 20 January
- Website: Official website

Campolattaro (Campanian: Campulattàrë) is a comune in the Province of Benevento in the Italian region of Campania, located about 60 kilometres (37 mi) northeast of Naples and about 20 km (12 mi) north of Benevento.
