= Province of Benevento =

Province of Italy

Coordinates: 41°8′N 14°47′E

Province of Benevento Provincia di Benevento (Italian) Pruvincia 'e Beneviento (Neapolitan)
- Province
- Flag Coat of arms

- Location of the province of Benevento in Italy
- Country: Italy
- Region: Campania
- Capital(s): Benevento
- Municipalities: 78

Government
  - President: Nino Lombardi

Area
  - Total: 2,080.44 km^{2} (803.26 sq mi)

Population (2026)
  - Total: 257,968
  - Density: 123.997/km^{2} (321.150/sq mi)

GDP
  - Total: €4.508 billion (2015)
  - Per capita: €16,014 (2015)
- Time zone: UTC+1 (CET)
  - Summer (DST): UTC+2 (CEST)
- Postal code: 82010-82038
- Telephone prefix: 0823, 0824
- Vehicle registration: BN
- ISTAT: 62

The Province of Benevento (Italian: provincia di Benevento, Neapolitan: Pruvincia 'e Beneviento) is a province in the region of Campania in southern Italy. Its capital is the city of Benevento. It has a population of 257,968 in an area of 2,080.44 square kilometres (803.26 sq mi) across its 78 municipalities.

== Geography ==
The territory of the province of Benevento closely approximates that of the Principality of Benevento in the mid and late 11th century. It borders Molise (province of Campobasso) to the north, Apulia (province of Foggia) to the east, the province of Avellino and the metropolitan City of Naples to the south, and the province of Caserta to the west.

The lowest point is in the comune of Limatola (44 meters above sea level), while the highest point is Monte Mutria (1822 meters), one of the mountains of the Matese range, which separates the province of Benevento from Molise.

== Municipalities ==
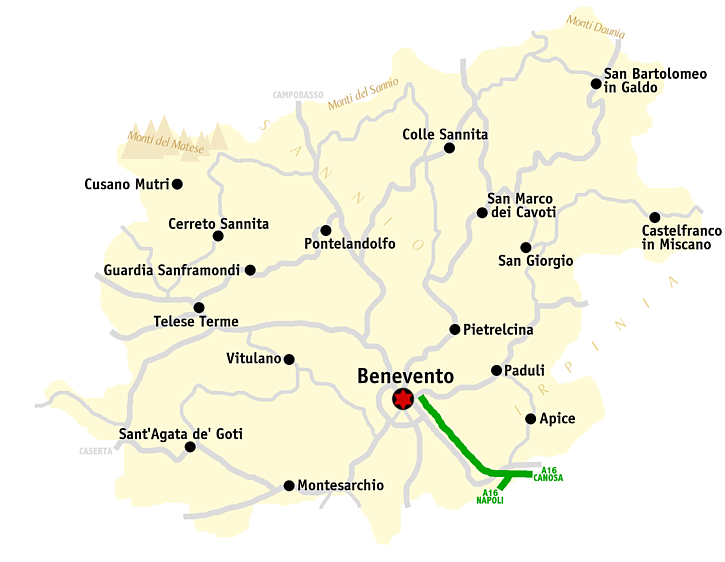
Detailed map of the province

- Airola
- Amorosi
- Apice
- Apollosa
- Arpaia
- Arpaise
- Baselice
- Benevento
- Bonea
- Bucciano
- Buonalbergo
- Calvi
- Campolattaro
- Campoli del Monte Taburno
- Casalduni
- Castelfranco in Miscano
- Castelpagano
- Castelpoto
- Castelvenere
- Castelvetere in Val Fortore
- Cautano
- Ceppaloni
- Cerreto Sannita
- Circello
- Colle Sannita
- Cusano Mutri
- Dugenta
- Durazzano
- Faicchio
- Foglianise
- Foiano di Val Fortore
- Forchia
- Fragneto l'Abate
- Fragneto Monforte
- Frasso Telesino
- Ginestra degli Schiavoni
- Guardia Sanframondi
- Limatola
- Melizzano
- Moiano
- Molinara
- Montefalcone di Val Fortore
- Montesarchio
- Morcone
- Paduli
- Pago Veiano
- Pannarano
- Paolisi
- Paupisi
- Pesco Sannita
- Pietraroja
- Pietrelcina
- Ponte
- Pontelandolfo
- Puglianello
- Reino
- San Bartolomeo in Galdo
- San Giorgio del Sannio
- San Giorgio La Molara
- San Leucio del Sannio
- San Lorenzello
- San Lorenzo Maggiore
- San Lupo
- San Marco dei Cavoti
- San Martino Sannita
- San Nazzaro
- San Nicola Manfredi
- San Salvatore Telesino
- Sant'Agata de' Goti
- Sant'Angelo a Cupolo
- Sant'Arcangelo Trimonte
- Santa Croce del Sannio
- Sassinoro
- Solopaca
- Telese Terme
- Tocco Caudio
- Torrecuso
- Vitulano

== Demographics ==
As of 2026, the population is 257,968, of which 49.3% are male, and 50.7% are female. Minors make up 13.9% of the population, and seniors make up 25.7%.

Historical population

Year	Pop.	±%
1861	221,426	—
1871	232,658	+5.1%
1881	237,161	+1.9%
1901	261,738	+10.4%
1911	267,424	+2.2%
1921	277,750	+3.9%
1931	293,985	+5.8%
1936	304,578	+3.6%

Year	Pop.	±%
1951	333,203	+9.4%
1961	314,253	−5.7%
1971	287,613	−8.5%
1981	289,143	+0.5%
1991	293,026	+1.3%
2001	287,042	−2.0%
2011	284,900	−0.7%
2021	265,055	−7.0%

Source: ISTAT

=== Immigration ===
As of 2025, the foreign-born population is 17,006, making up 6.6% of the total population. The 5 largest foreign countries of origin are Switzerland (2,407), Romania (2,063), Ukraine (1,525), Germany (1,063) and Morocco (832).

== Main sights ==
=== Benevento ===
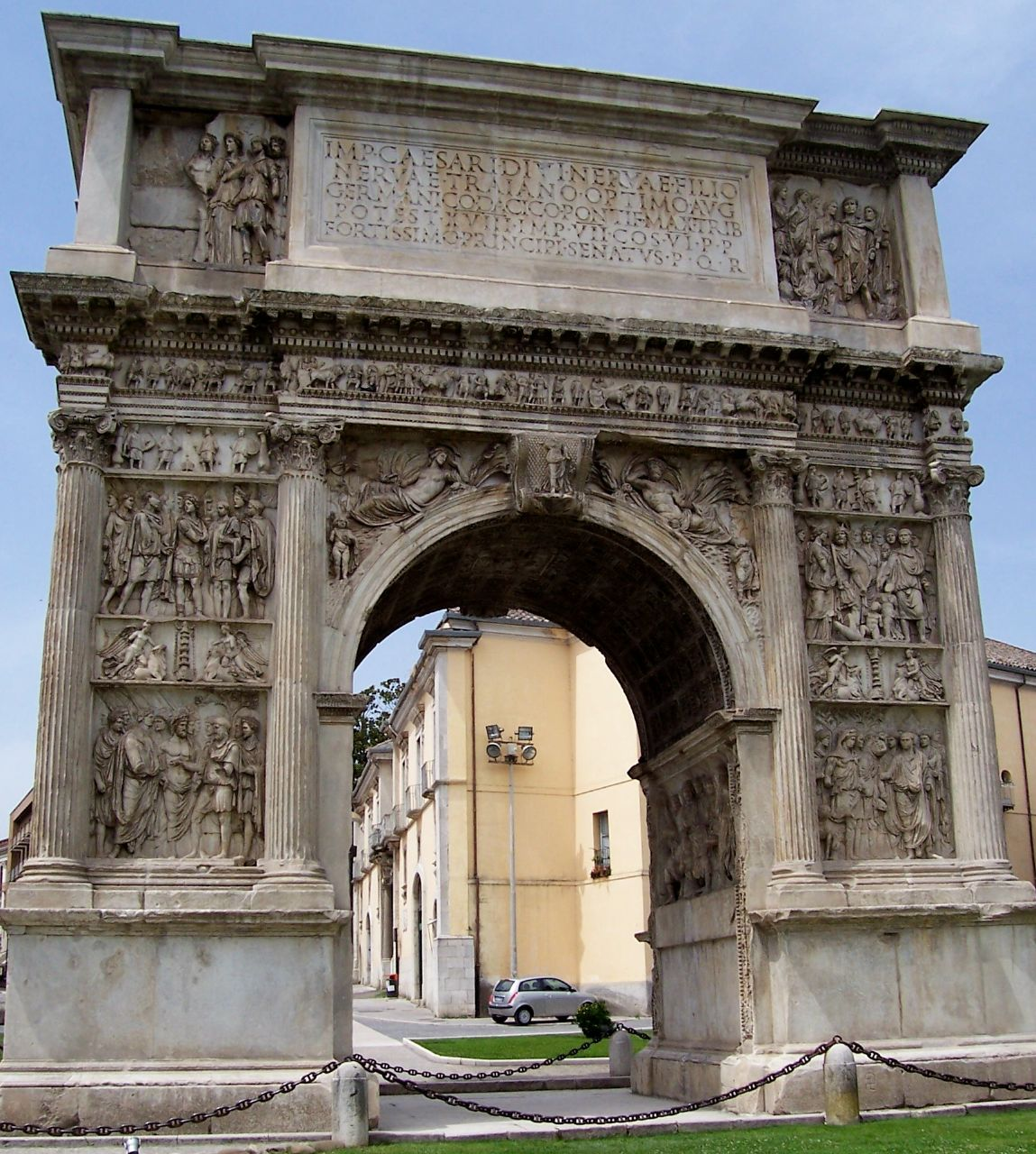
Arch of Trajan

The importance of Benevento in classical times is vouched for by the many remains of antiquity which it possesses, of which the most famous is the triumphal arch erected in honour of Trajan by the senate and people of Rome in 114, with important reliefs relating to its history. Enclosed in the walls, this construction marked the entrance in Benevento of the Via Traiana, the road built by the Spanish emperor to shorten the path from Rome to Brindisi. The reliefs show the civil and military deeds of Trajan. A great part of the arch is decorated with scenes in bas relief: particularly the pillars directed to the town represent scenes of peace and military scenes. The two faces of the Arch are identical in the arrangement of the reliefs. That the reliefs are for the most part not merely fanciful, nor chiefly conventional and decorative in theme and treatment, is also clear at first sight. They plainly refer to actual events and actions in the life of Trajan, whose effigy, sometimes decapitated, appears in all but two of them, one of which is the only one on all the Arch that is substantially defective. The height of the monument is of 15,60 meter, with an arch of 8 meter, a structure composed of limestone rocks and a marble covering. The arch was put during the Middle Age in the fenced area of the town, in order to represent the Porta Aurea, on account of its fair proportions and the wealth and excellence of its sculptural adornments.

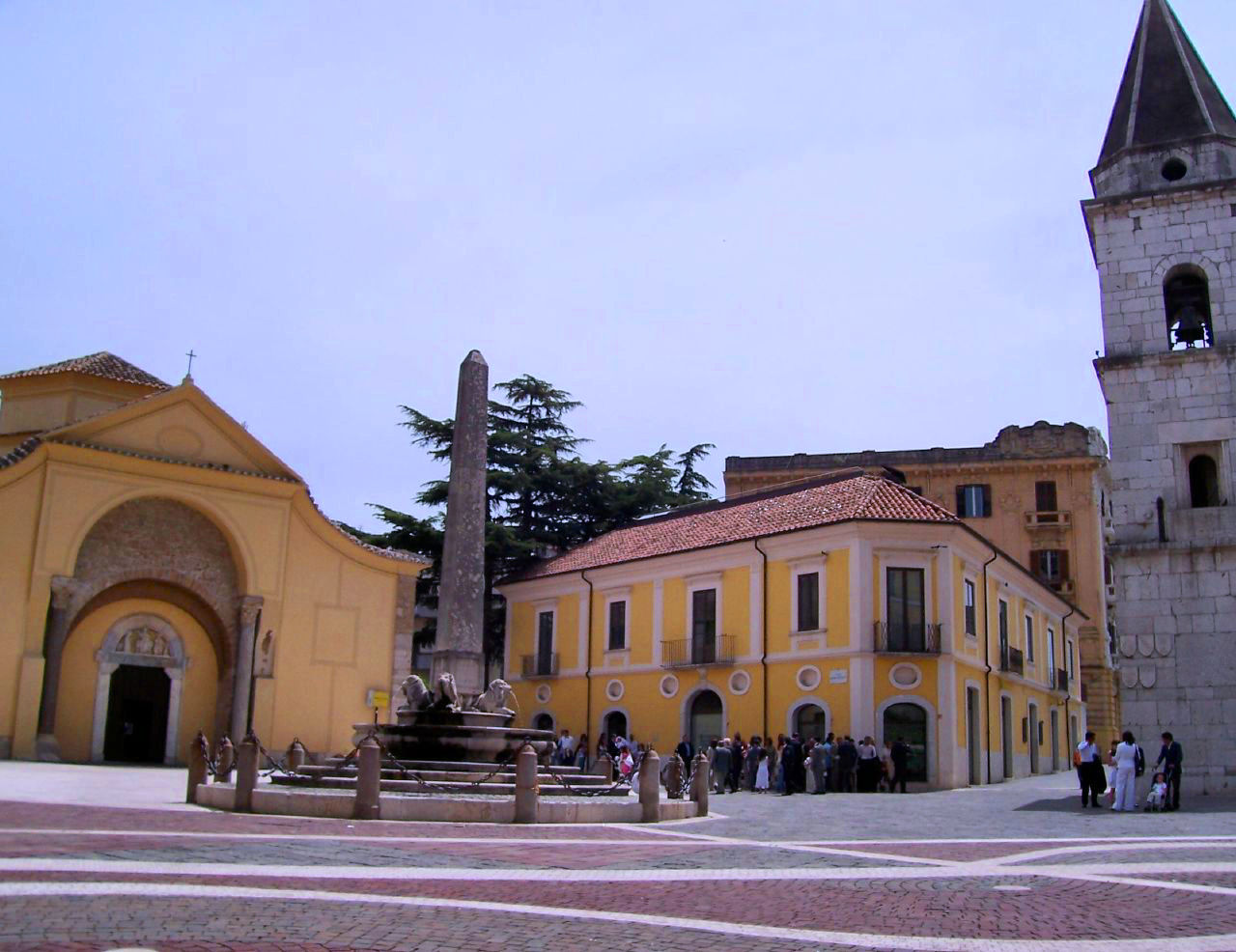
The church of Santa Sofia

The church of Santa Sofia is a circular Lombard edifice dating to c. 760, now modernized, of small proportions, and is one of the main examples of religious Lombard architecture. The plan consists of a central hexagon with, at each vertex, columns taken from the temple of Isis; these are connected by arches which support the cupola. The inner hexagon is in turn enclosed in a decagonal ring with eight white limestone pillars and two columns next to the entrance. The church has a fine cloister of the 12th century, constructed in part of fragments of earlier buildings. This cloister today is the location of the Museo del Sannio. The church interior was once totally frescoed by Byzantine artists: fragments of these paintings, portraying the Histories of Christ, can be still seen in the two side apses. Santa Sofia was almost destroyed by the earthquake of 1688, and rebuilt in Baroque forms by commission of the then cardinal Orsini of Benevento (later Pope Benedict XIII). The original forms were hidden, and were recovered only after the discussed restoration of 1951. In 2011, it became a UNESCO World Heritage Site as part of a group of seven inscribed as Longobards in Italy, Places of Power (568-774 A.D.).

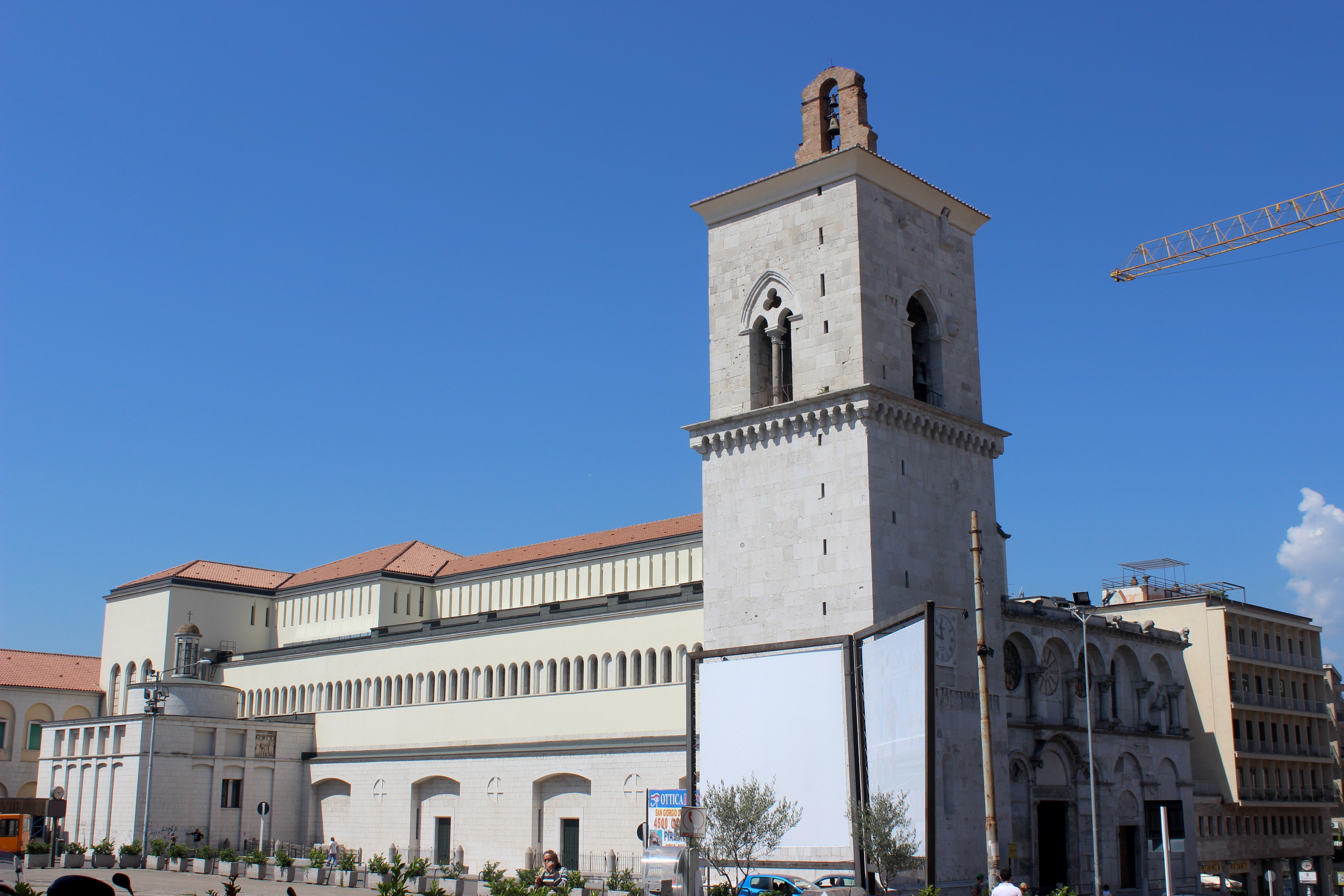
Benevento Cathedral

The Benevento Cathedral, with its arcaded façade and incomplete square campanile (begun in 1279 by the archbishop Romano Capodiferro) dates from the 9th century. It was rebuilt in 1114, the façade inspired by the Pisan Gothic style. Its bronze doors, adorned with bas-reliefs, are notable example of Romanesque art which may belong to the beginning of the 13th century. The interior is in the form of a basilica, the double aisles carried on ancient columns. There are ambones resting on columns supported by lions, and decorated with reliefs and coloured marble mosaic, and a candelabrum of 1311. A marble statue of the apostle San Bartolomeo, by Nicola da Monteforte, is also from the 14th century. The cathedral also contains a statue of St. Giuseppe Moscati, a native of the area. The cathedral was completely destroyed in 1943 because of bombardments: what remained of the cathedral were just the bell tower, the façade and the crypt. Another testimony of the cathedral is the 12th-century bronze door, the Janua Major, composed of 72 tiles with bas relief, whose fragments were rebuilt after the Second World War. The current monument, with its modern aspect, was completed in 1965 and restored between 2005 and 2012.

=== Montesarchio ===
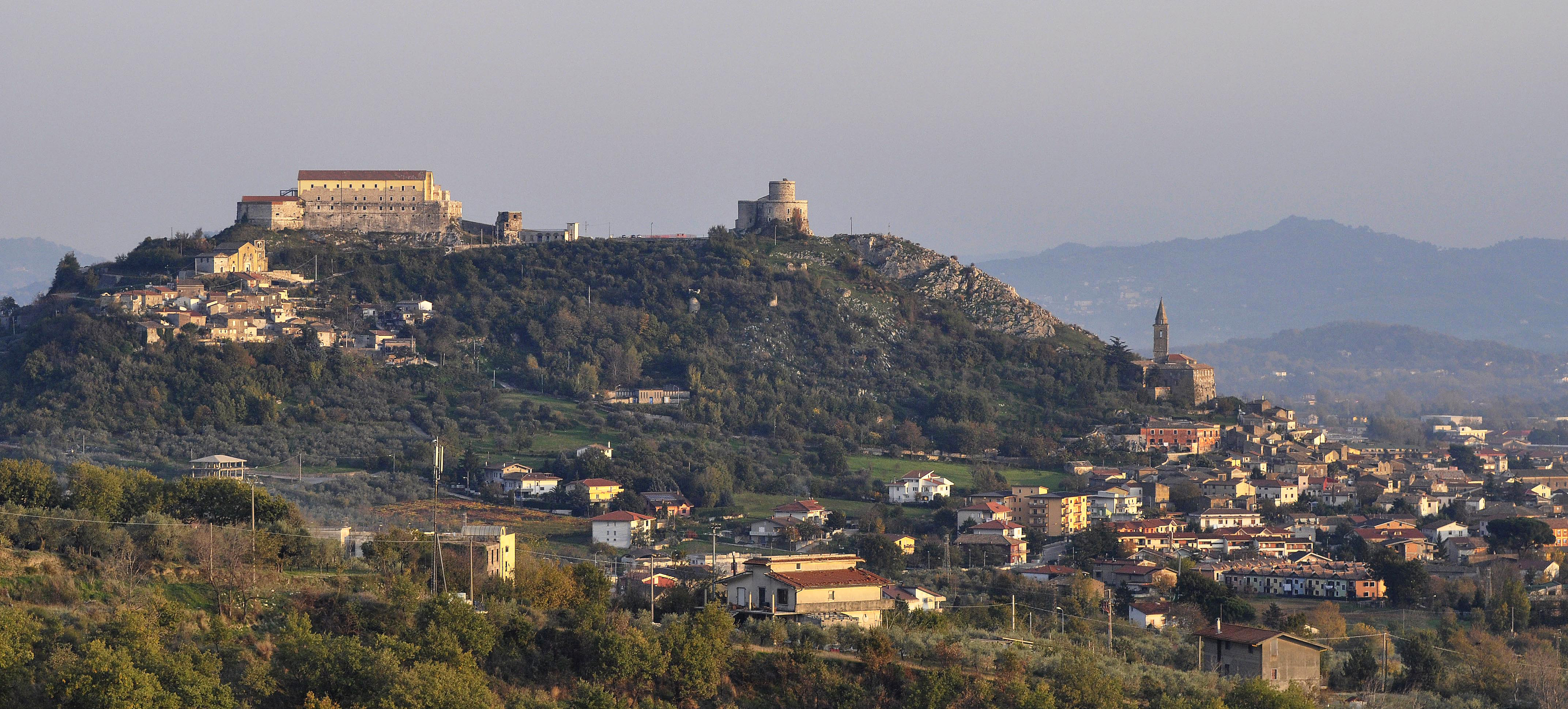
Montesarchio

Mains sights of Montesarchio are:

- The D'Avalos Castle, later turned into a jail by the Bourbon Kings of Two Sicilies.
- Abbey of St. Nicholas.
- Church of St. Francis.
- Ancient marble fountain, in the main square.

=== Sant'Agata de' Goti ===
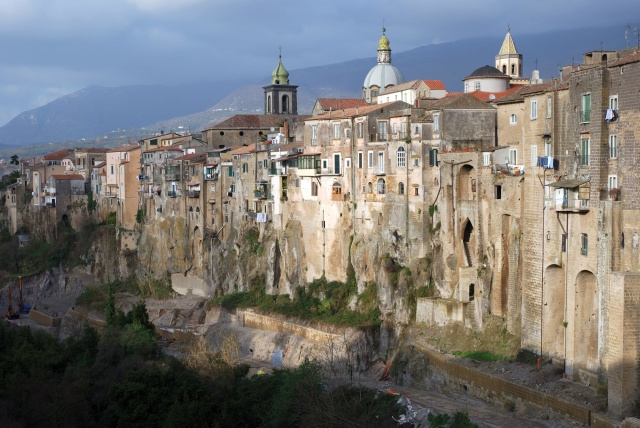
Sant'Agata de' Goti

Mains sights of Sant'Agata de' Goti are:

- Cathedral (Duomo), founded in the 10th century, dedicated to the Assumption of Mary. Due to the repeated reconstruction, little remains of the original edifice. The Romanesque crypt shows parts which could belong to several pre-existing buildings, including Roman or earlier ones.
- Church of San Menna (10th century).
- Castle, used as Ducal Palace.
- Palace and church of St. Francis (1282).
- Gothic church of the Annunziata (13th century). It houses 15th-century frescoes, and a diptych of the Annunciation dating to the same age.
- The Council Room in City Hall was decorated in 1899 by Vincenzo Severino.

=== San Marco dei Cavoti ===
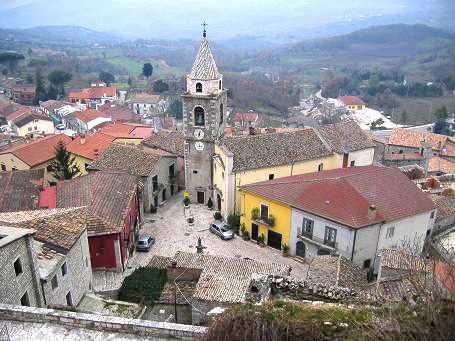
San Marco dei Cavoti

Mains sights of San Marco dei Cavoti are:

- Torre Provenzale ("Provençal Tower"), a 14th-century jail later turned into a bell tower.
- Church of Maria SS.del Carmine (14th century), remade and provided with new frescoes in the 18th century.
- Rural church of Santa Barbara (16th century)
- Palace Jelardi (18th century)
