= San Marco dei Cavoti =

- Comune
- Comune di San Marco dei Cavoti
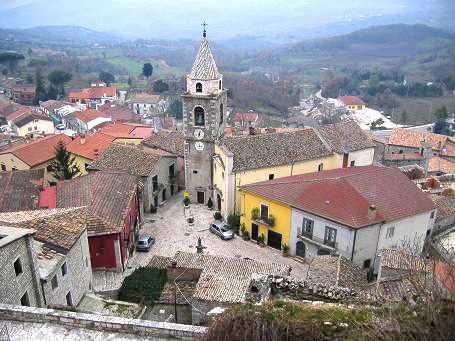

- Location within Italy Location within Campania
- Coordinates: 41°18′N 14°52′E
- Country: Italy
- Region: Campania
- Province: Benevento (BN)
- Frazioni: Aia del Fuoco, Borgognone, Calisi, Capoiazzo, Casaiarocca, Casone Cocca, Catapano, Ciannavera, Coperchiata, Cretazzi, Cuponi, Fontana dell'Olmo, Fontanelle, Fontecanale, Fonte dei Cavi, Fonte di Stelle, Fonte Zuppino, Francisi, Franzese, Iaminardi, Leccata, Maddalena, Montedoro, Montelse, Nevizzica, Padino, Paolella, Perreri, Peschiti, Piana delle Cardarelle, Piana delle Logge, Pilabove, Piloni, Pirosa, Riccetto, Ripa, Rocce, San Severo, Santa Maria la Macchia, Sole Bianco, Stampone, Tamburrino, Toppo della Chiesa, Toppo San Silvestro, Toppo Santa Barbara, Tosti, Turone, Valle di Stefano, Zenna

Government
  - Mayor: Giovanni Rossi

Area
  - Total: 48.8 km^{2} (18.8 sq mi)
- Elevation: 695 m (2,280 ft)

Population (1 January 2015)
  - Total: 3,422
  - Density: 70.1/km^{2} (182/sq mi)
- Demonym: Sanmarchesi
- Time zone: UTC+1 (CET)
  - Summer (DST): UTC+2 (CEST)
- Postal code: 82029
- Dialing code: 0824
- Patron saint: St. Mark
- Saint day: April 25
- Website: Official website

San Marco dei Cavoti (Italian pronunciation: [sam ˈmarko dei kaˈvɔːti]) is a comune (municipality) in the Province of Benevento in the Italian region Campania, located near the Fortore River valley.

San Marco is one of the best-known places in Italy for the production of torrone. There are around 10 companies in the production of this product, mainly family owned.

In the past the internal economy was dominated by textile productions, but later the production fell along with the Italian trends.

== Main sights ==
- Torre Provenzale ("Provençal Tower"), a 14th-century jail later turned into a bell tower.
- Church of Maria SS.del Carmine (14th century), remade and provided with new frescoes in the 18th century.
- Rural church of Santa Barbara (16th century)
- Palace Jelardi (18th century)

== Notable people ==
- Lido Anthony "Lee" Iacocca
