= Clotilde Micheli =

Beatified Italian Roman Catholic

Blessed Maria Serafina of the Sacred Heart
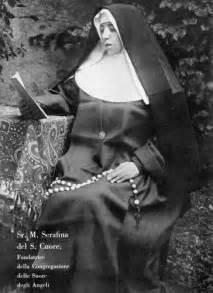

Virgin
- Born: 11 September 1849; Imér, Tyrol, Austrian Empire
- Died: 24 March 1911 (aged 61); Faicchio, Benevento, Kingdom of Italy
- Resting place: Faicchio, Italy
- Venerated in: Roman Catholic Church
- Beatified: 28 May 2011, Faicchio, Benevento, Italy by Cardinal Angelo Amato
- Feast: 24 March

Clotilde Micheli (11 September 1849 - 24 March 1911), known by her religious name Maria Serafina of the Sacred Heart, was an Italian Roman Catholic professed religious who established a religious congregation known as the Sisters of Angels.

Micheli was beatified in Benevento in 2011. Cardinal Angelo Amato presided over the celebration on the behalf of the pontiff.

== Life ==
Clotilde Micheli was born in Imer, Austrian Empire on 11 September 1849. She received Confirmation at the age of three in 1852 from the Bishop of Trent Johann Nepomuk von Tschiderer zu Gleifheim.

During her childhood Micheli reported having an apparition in which her guardian angel came to her with an invitation from the Blessed Virgin Mary to consecrate herself as a virgin to her. Micheli received her First Communion in 1858 at the age of nine and after this felt a strong pull to the religious life; she spent her nights in long periods of Eucharistic adoration. As a child she received her education from her mother who instilled in her a sense of virtue and the fundamental Christian ethics. On the night of 2 August 1867 – in the parish church of her hometown — the Blessed Mother appeared with angels around her and showed her that it was Micheli's mission to found a religious congregation for the purpose of worshiping the Holy Trinity, with special devotion to Our Lady and the Angels, as models of prayer and service.

Micheli received the consolation of a friend and went to Venice for the spiritual guidance of Domenico Agostini, who advised her to draft a Rule; she was frightened at the prospect of this and believed she had no inspiration so returned in sadness to her hometown having written nothing. Micheli relocated to Padua in 1867 close to the priest Angelo Piacentini whom she confided her doubts to. She remained under his spiritual direction until his death in 1876; in 1878 she realized that her parents — without her knowledge — were in the process of arranging a marriage for her. Her response to this was to flee to Epfendorf in the Kingdom of Württemberg. Micheli remained there until 1885 where she worked as a nurse in a clinic that the Elizabethan sisters ran. However her mother died in 1883 and her father followed in 1885 around the time she left Epfendorf for her hometown and remained there alone until 1887 when she decided to discern her project for a congregation.

In May 1887, she, alongside her niece Giuditta, set out on foot for a pilgrimage to Rome and made it an objective to stop at all Marian sanctuaries along the route as a means of receiving further inspiration for her project. In August she arrived in Rome and joined the congregation known as the Suore Immacolatine; she took the habit and received the name Maria Annunziata. She remained with that congregation until 1891 and served as the Mother Superior of a convent in the village of Sgurgola in the Diocese of Anagni. She came to know the Franciscan priest Francesco Fusco da Trani while she was in Assisi during her pilgrimage and he wrote to her in order to advise her to leave her congregation and go to Piedimonte d'Alife where Bishop Antonio Scotti had plans for an congregation of his own. However upon meeting Scotti she realized their plans were not at all similar.

Micheli then travelled to Caserta and, alongside the sister Filomena Scaringi, remained in a household with people who provided her with both material and spiritual support. She set her own house in Casolla with two women and led to the Bishop of Caserta, Enrico De Rossi, authorizing the small congregation Micheli had established as the Sisters of the Angels on 28 June 1891. She discarded her previous religious name and took the name Maria Serafina of the Sacred Heart. During her lifetime the congregation flourished with a total of fifteen houses being established. The congregation would later spread elsewhere to places such as Indonesia and Benin. A house in Faicchio opened in June 1899 as a place for formation.

≤Micheli became quite ill in 1895, almost close to death, and refused medical treatment. Instead she was moved elsewhere for a period of rest in order to recover from her illness. Micheli died on 24 March 1911. Her remains are interred in Faicchio.

== Beatification ==
The beatification process commenced on 9 July 1990 after the Congregation for the Causes of Saints under Pope John Paul II declared the nihil obstat ("nothing against") to the cause which also granted her the title Servant of God. The diocesan process spanned from 1 October 1990 until 15 March 1992 and saw the thorough investigation of her life as well as the visions that she was prone to. Upon the closure of this process all documentation was submitted to Roman officials for investigation on their end; the so-called "Roman Phase" commenced on 2 July 1993 after the diocesan process was cleared of having done its work according to the set criteria.

The postulation compiled and submitted the positio to Rome for further investigation while the large dossier included biographical details as well as attesting to the manner in which she led her life according to Christian values. This also had to face the historical commission on 14 January 2003 who had to determine whether or not there were obstacles to the cause; the historians approved it and thus would allow the cause to continue. On 3 July 2009 Micheli was declared as venerable after Pope Benedict XVI acknowledged the fact that she had practiced a life of heroic virtue.

A miracle attributed to her intercession was investigated from 28 November 2003 to 25 January 2005; it was then submitted to Roman officials for further investigation and received formal ratification on 20 May 2005. The Rome-based medical board met in order to discuss if the healing was indeed a credible miracle and approved it after meeting on 3 December 2009 while consulting theologians approved it on 26 March 2010; the Congregation for the Causes of Saints followed suit on 8 June 2010 and passed it to Benedict XVI for his approval on 1 July 2010. Micheli was beatified on 28 May 2011 in Benevento. The postulator assigned to the cause is Giuseppina Romano.
