= Santa Maria in Gruptis =

Coordinates: 41°11′34″N 14°36′58″E

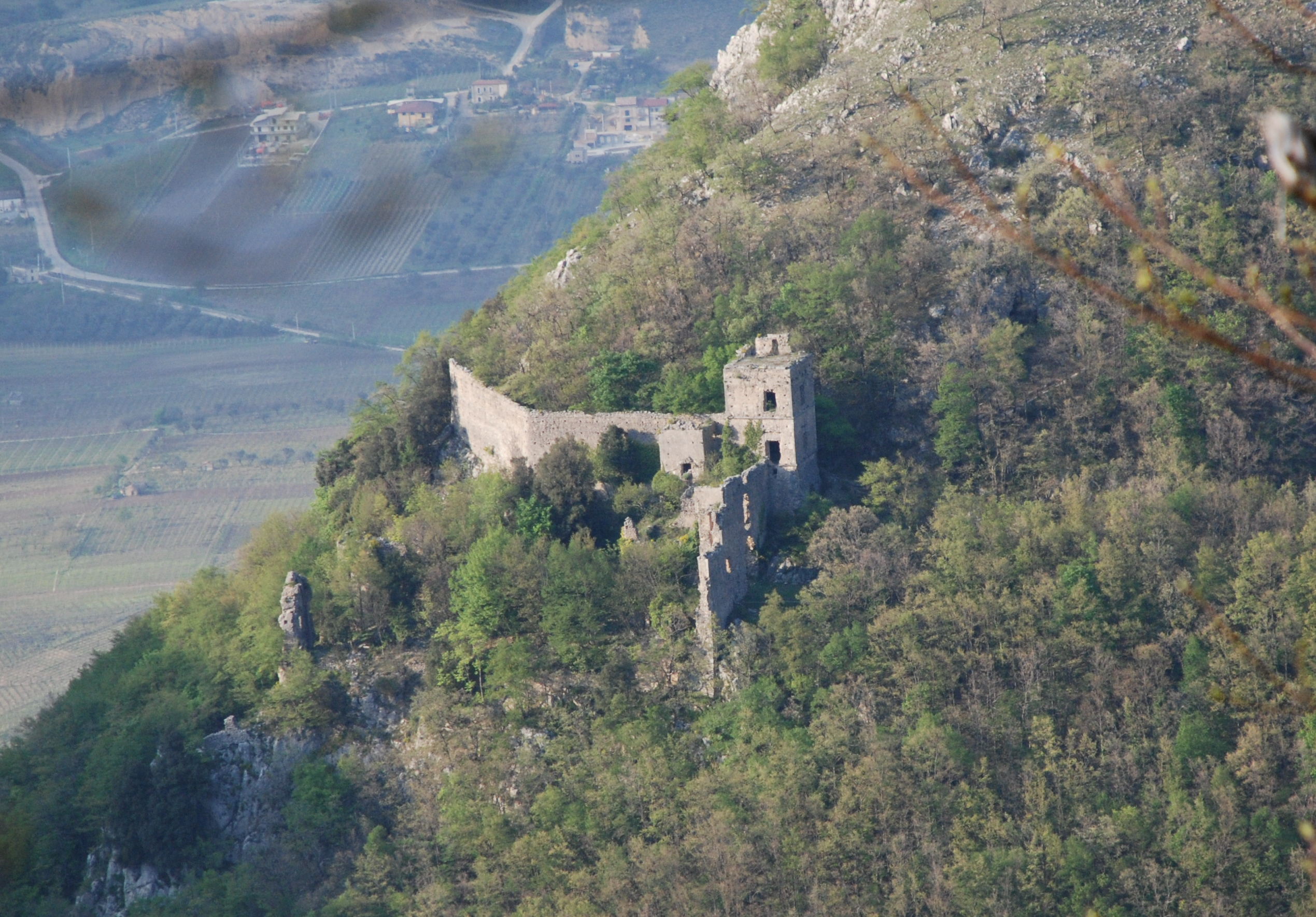
A view of the abbey

Santa Maria in Gruptis is a former abbey located in the comune of Vitulano, in the Campania region of Southern Italy. Founded in the 10th century and used by several monastic orders, it was deconsecrated in 1705, and is currently in ruins.

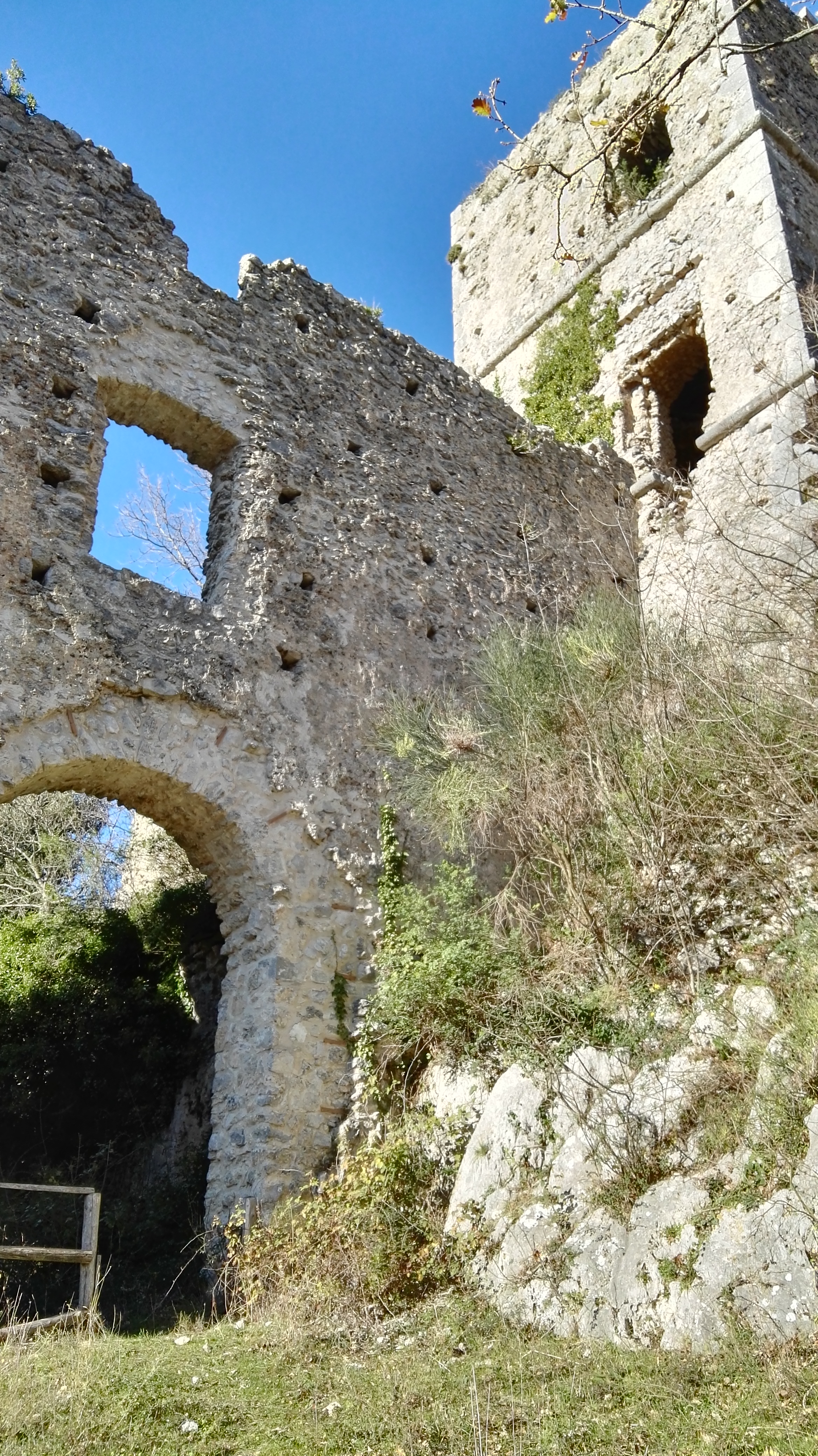
The tower and the entrance portal.

== Name ==
The name "in gruptis" refers to the karst caves in the area, which were used to gather and distribute water to the abbey. The oldest recorded name was Santa Maria di Monte Drago, in reference to the mountain where the abbey is located. The two names were used in the 12th century with inconsistent spellings, such as "Santa Maria di Monte Drocho", "Santa Maria in Cripta", "Santa Maria de la Grocta". In a 1545 decree by the then abbot Blasio Sellaroli the abbey was named Santa Maria dello Vallo di Vitulano ("Saint Mary of the Valley of Vitulano").

== Location ==
The former abbey is located at an elevation of 607 metres above sea level, on Mount Drago, one of the mountains composing the Taburno Camposauro massif, in the province of Benevento. It belongs to the comune of Foglianise, although geographically it is part of the Vitulano municipality. It is located on the side of a gorge known as "funno", in a steep and strategic position with a view over the valley. It can be reached only by foot, with hiking trails.

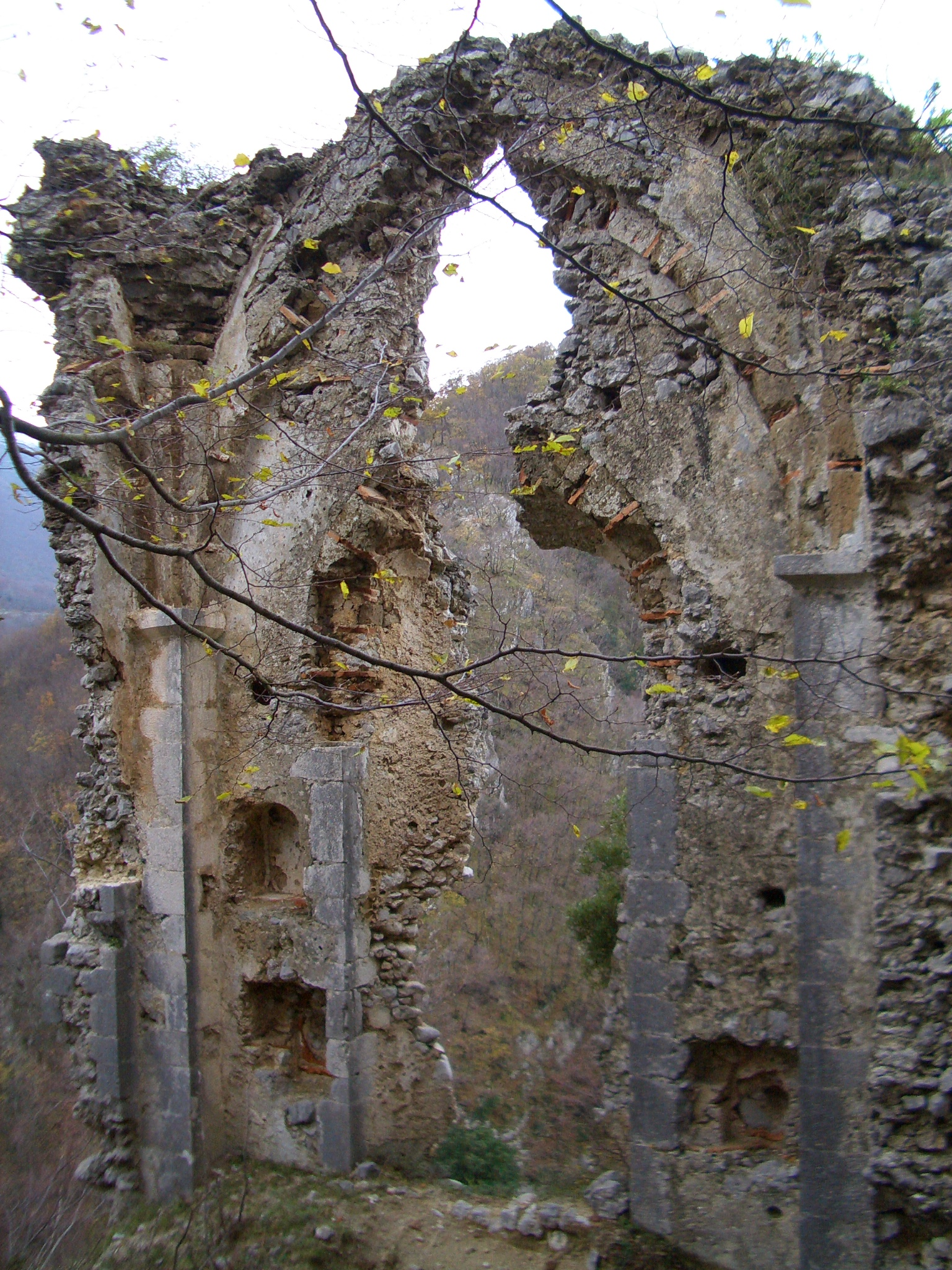
The ruins of the apse

== History ==
The abbey was founded between 940 and 944 by one of the Longobard princes of Benevento, either Atenulf II or Atenulf III. The first recorded documents related to the abbey date back to 1164. It was inhabited by a succession of monastic orders: at first the Benedictines monks, for whose use it was initially intended, then the Celestines and then the Humiliati. The abbey owned several fiefs. In 1303 the Anjous attempted to incorporate the abbey into another abbey, that of Santa Maria in Mazzocca, near Foiano di Val Fortore. A popular revolt from the inhabitants of the area halted the plan.

In 1660, the abbey was given to the Camaldolese monks, but it was abandoned after the 1688 Sannio earthquake. It was deconsecrated by Cardinal Orsini (later Pope Benedict XIII) in 1705 because of its state of neglect and the continued attacks by brigands, who later used it as a refuge because of its strategic position. The parchments produced in the abbey were bought at the beginning of the 19th century by antiquarians, and were donated by their heirs to the Società Napoletana di Storia Patria (it), where they are still kept.

== Ruins ==
Today large portions of ruins of the abbey remain. Still visible are the tower, the entrance portal, and part of the encircling walls, which were built at a later date. Of the ancient church remains the apse.
