= Castelpoto =

- Comune
- Comune di Castelpoto
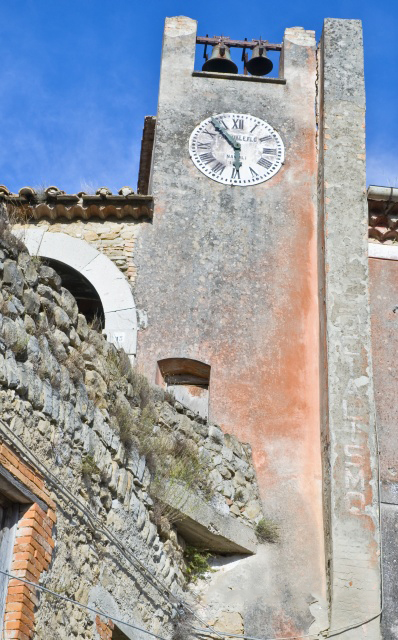
- The watch tower of Castelpoto

- Location within Italy Location within Campania
- Country: Italy
- Region: Campania
- Province: Benevento (BN)

Government
  - Mayor: Vito Fusco

Area
  - Total: 11.78 km^{2} (4.55 sq mi)
- Elevation: 285 m (935 ft)

Population (1 January 2020)
  - Total: 1,168
  - Density: 99.15/km^{2} (256.8/sq mi)
- Demonym: Castelpotani
- Time zone: UTC+1 (CET)
  - Summer (DST): UTC+2 (CEST)
- Postal code: 82030
- Dialing code: 0824
- ISTAT code: 062018
- Patron saint: Constantius of Capri
- Saint day: 14 May
- Website: Official website

Castelpoto is a comune (municipality) in the Province of Benevento in the Italian region Campania, located about 50 km (31 mi) northeast of Naples and about 7 km (4.3 mi) west of Benevento.

Castelpoto borders the following municipalities: Apollosa, Benevento, Campoli del Monte Taburno, Foglianise, Vitulano.
