= Ruviano =

- Comune
- Comune di Ruviano
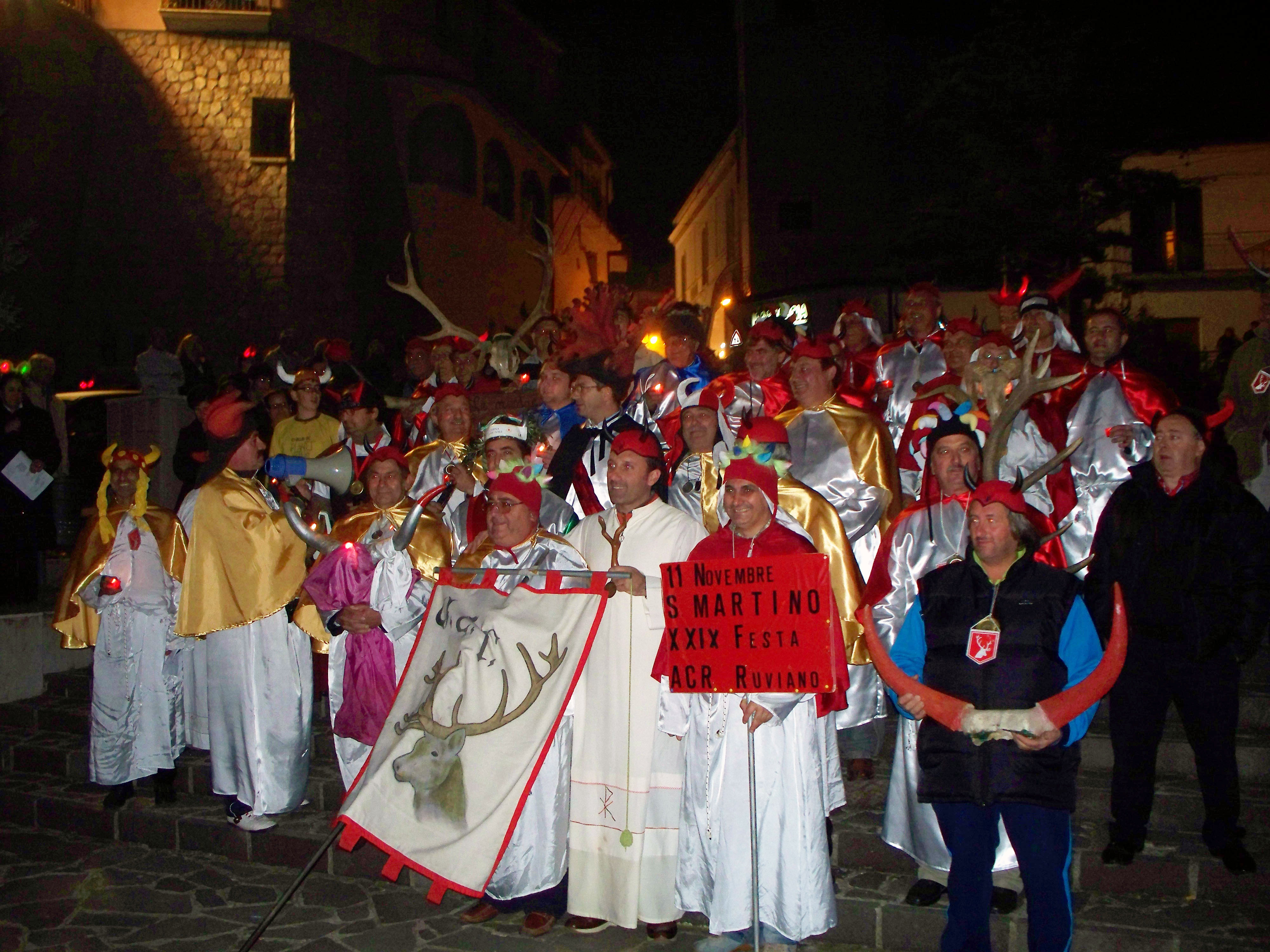

- Location within Italy Location within Campania
- Coordinates: 41°13′N 14°25′E
- Country: Italy
- Region: Campania
- Province: Caserta (CE)

Government
  - Mayor: Roberto Cusano

Area
  - Total: 24.4 km^{2} (9.4 sq mi)
- Elevation: 80 m (260 ft)

Population (31 December 2010)
  - Total: 1,839
  - Density: 75.4/km^{2} (195/sq mi)
- Demonym: Ruvianesi
- Time zone: UTC+1 (CET)
  - Summer (DST): UTC+2 (CEST)
- Postal code: 81010
- Dialing code: 0823
- Patron saint: St. Leo
- Saint day: 10 November, First Sunday in May
- Website: Official website

Ruviano is a comune (municipality) in the Province of Caserta in the Italian region Campania, located about 45 kilometres (28 mi) northeast of Naples and about 20 kilometres (12 mi) northeast of Caserta.

Ruviano borders the following municipalities: Alvignano, Amorosi, Caiazzo, Castel Campagnano, Faicchio, Gioia Sannitica, Puglianello.
