= Dugenta =

- Comune
- Comune di Dugenta
- Location within Italy Location within Campania
- Coordinates: 41°8′N 14°27′E
- Country: Italy
- Region: Campania
- Province: Benevento (BN)
- Frazioni: Santa Maria Impesole, San Nicola

Government
  - Mayor: Clemente Di Cerbo

Area
  - Total: 16.0 km^{2} (6.2 sq mi)
- Elevation: 55 m (180 ft)

Population (1 January 2020)
  - Total: 2,721
  - Density: 170/km^{2} (440/sq mi)
- Demonym: Dugentesi
- Time zone: UTC+1 (CET)
  - Summer (DST): UTC+2 (CEST)
- Postal code: 82030
- Dialing code: 0824
- ISTAT code: 062027
- Patron saint: Saint Andrew
- Saint day: 30 November
- Website: Official website

Dugenta (Campanian: Rocenti) is a comune (municipality) in the Province of Benevento in the Italian region Campania, located about 35 kilometres (22 mi) northeast of Naples and about 30 kilometres (19 mi) west of Benevento.

Dugenta borders the following municipalities: Castel Campagnano, Frasso Telesino, Limatola, Melizzano, Sant'Agata de' Goti.

== Geography ==
Dugenta is located along the valley of fiume Volturno and surrounded by the hills of Melizzano, Frasso Telesino, Sant'Agata de' Goti and Limatola.

It is about 45 km from Benevento, 50 km from Naples and 20 km from Caserta.

The residential area rises along five divergent streets, assuming a tentacled structure; however the road network is essentially composed by SSV Fondo Valle Isclero, ex SS 265 dei Ponti della Valle and by ex SS 87 Sannitica (Naples–Campobasso).

== History ==
There are various hypotheses regarding the etymology of the word "Dugenta" and of its older variation "Ducenta". The historian Gleijeses thought that this toponym derived from 'duae gentes', in the name of the alliance between Romans and Samnites that took place in these sites during the Roman expansion. Other theories instead connect this word to the original number of the villagers, about 200, or to the Roman centuriation. The name Ducenta appeared in a certificate dating back to 833 of Sicardo, Prince of Benevento. But the first evidence results from the donation made by Carlo I to Guglielmo of Belmonte in which it was defined as 'Casale' and valued a little more of 42 ounces. Then, it was given to Guglielmo of Vaudemont; it later passed to Addo de Souliac and finally to Pietro Braherio in 1291. At this point, the feud of Ducenta was separated from the homonymous castle, in which the Duke of Guisa was incarcerated in 1648 while attempting to escape from Naples. The village passed from Siginolfo di Telese to Andrea of Capua (that bought it in 1511) and later to other possessors of the County of Caserta like Annibale Monsorio in 1563. When feudalism was abolished in 1806, the Corsi's family from Firenze was invested by the title of Marquis of Ducenta. During the battle of Volturno in 1860, Ducenta was crossed by the 8000 men of the general Von Mechel that fought against Garibaldi's army guided from general Bixio. In 1943 Germans and Americans stationed around Dugenta that suffered the tragic effects of crossfire and bombings. In 1956 Dugenta gained its independence from Melizzano becoming an autonomous municipality.

== Architecture ==
=== Medieval Castle ===
The Medieval Castle is located in the historical centre of Dugenta and it has been the scene of some war events which happen to be fundamental for the formation of the Neapolitan Reign. It was donated to Guglielmo di Belmonte from Carlo I d'Angiò in 1268 and was part of Caserta County. Later, it passed to Adam de Vasis and then to Roberto D'Erville, who owned it until 1282. For the following years it has had several owners and, in 1459, Ferdinando I of Naples gave it to Giovanni della Ratta, along with the manors of Caserta, Limatola, Dugenta, Frasso Telesino and Melizzano. The Medieval Castle of Dugenta therefore arose as defensive structure of Valle. It had to be connected with other castles in the area with which exchanged fire and smoke signals, especially for alarms. It has never been explored entirely and, according to the legend, it has underground paths which should connect it with the castles of Limatola and Maddaloni. Currently, as a consequence of an earthquake that took place in 1980, very little has remained of the Medieval Castle of Dugenta, except for the boundary walls, the high base and one of the four towers.

=== Palazzo Vanvitelliano ===
The building dates back to the late XVII century and until now it has undergone several restorations that have changed its structure. It consists of two floors whose partially modified openings has been recently modified and decorated by a series of spandrels enriched by fine decorations. A stone well is placed on the right facade of the atrium and the courtyard features a stairway that leads to the apartments of the main floor. Three caves, accessible from the same courtyard, were built to accommodate pig farming at disposal of the Royal Palace of Caserta and the palace wings also contain farmers' room indeed. Then, this structure was turned into stables and shelter for people during World War II. During the 1980s it was used to house wineries. Currently, the palace is waiting to be reconstructed.

=== Chiesa Madre di S. Andrea Apostolo ===
It is one of the oldest churches of the diocese and it has a very simple structure, composed of a single nave. On the outside, there is a beautiful bell tower rising from the centre of the village, which has a mural on it representing S. Andrea Apostolo. The church was consecrated between 1110 and 1112 and in 1932 a second mural (representing Risen Christ) was painted by Tagliatela in order to decorate the vault at the entrance. Along the right wall, there's a shell-shaped fount (acquasantiera) made of stone. The church is adorned with several statues among which those of S. Teresina de Lisieux and S. Agnese.
