= Puglianello =

- Comune
- Comune di Puglianello
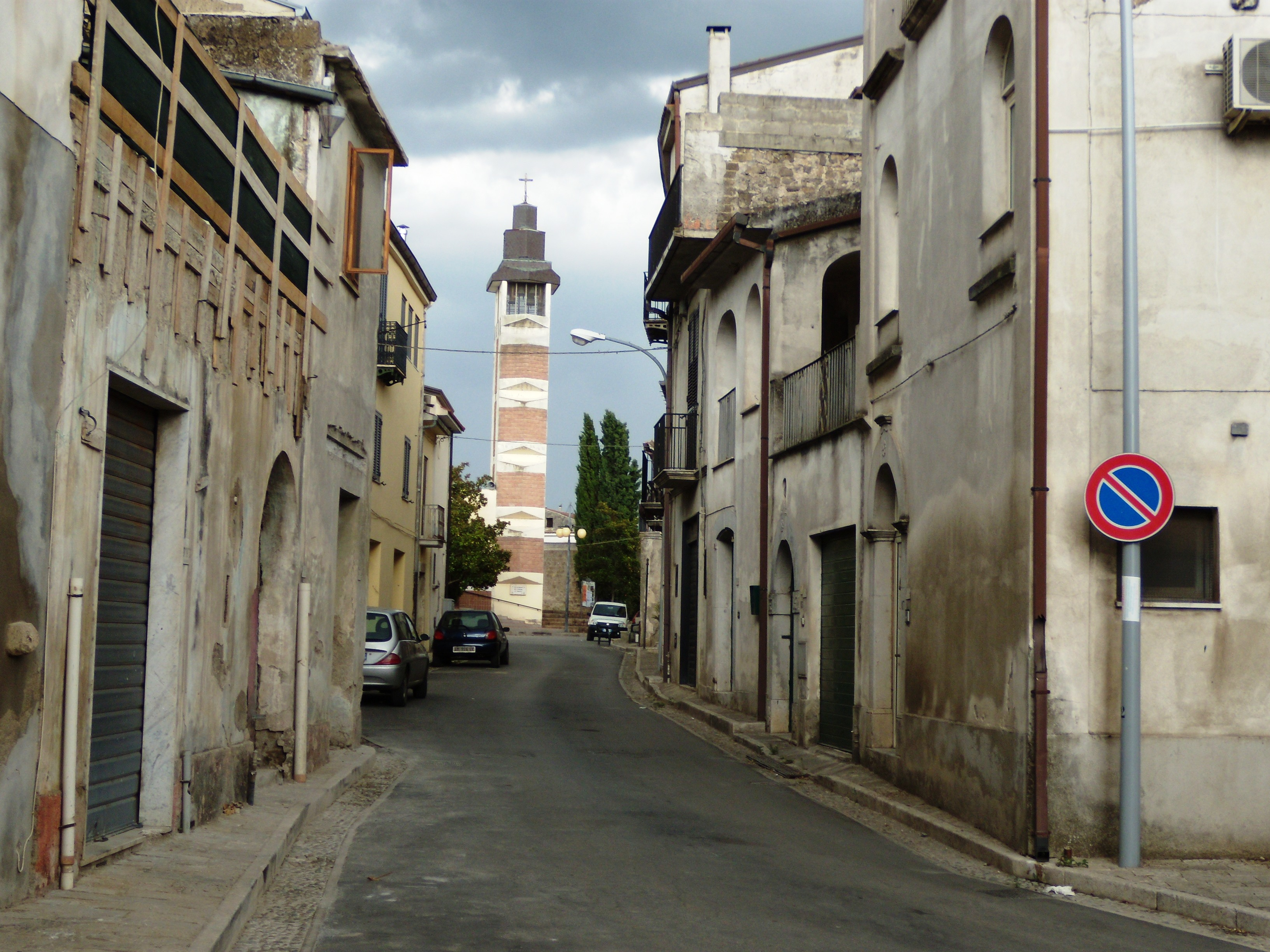

- Location within Italy Location within Campania
- Coordinates: 41°13′N 14°27′E
- Country: Italy
- Region: Campania
- Province: Benevento (BN)

Government
  - Mayor: Francesco Maria Rubano

Area
  - Total: 8.27 km^{2} (3.19 sq mi)
- Elevation: 61 m (200 ft)
- Highest elevation: 175 m (574 ft)
- Lowest elevation: 42 m (138 ft)

Population (1 January 2022)
  - Total: 1,286
  - Density: 156/km^{2} (403/sq mi)
- Demonym: Puglianellesi
- Time zone: UTC+1 (CET)
  - Summer (DST): UTC+2 (CEST)
- Postal code: 82030
- Dialing code: 0824
- ISTAT code: 062055
- Patron saint: James the Great
- Saint day: 25 July
- Website: Official website

Puglianello is a comune (municipality) in the Province of Benevento in the Italian region Campania, located about 45 km northeast of Naples and about 30 km northwest of Benevento.

Puglianello borders the following municipalities: Amorosi, Faicchio, Ruviano, San Salvatore Telesino.
