= Solopaca =

- Comune
- Comune di Solopaca
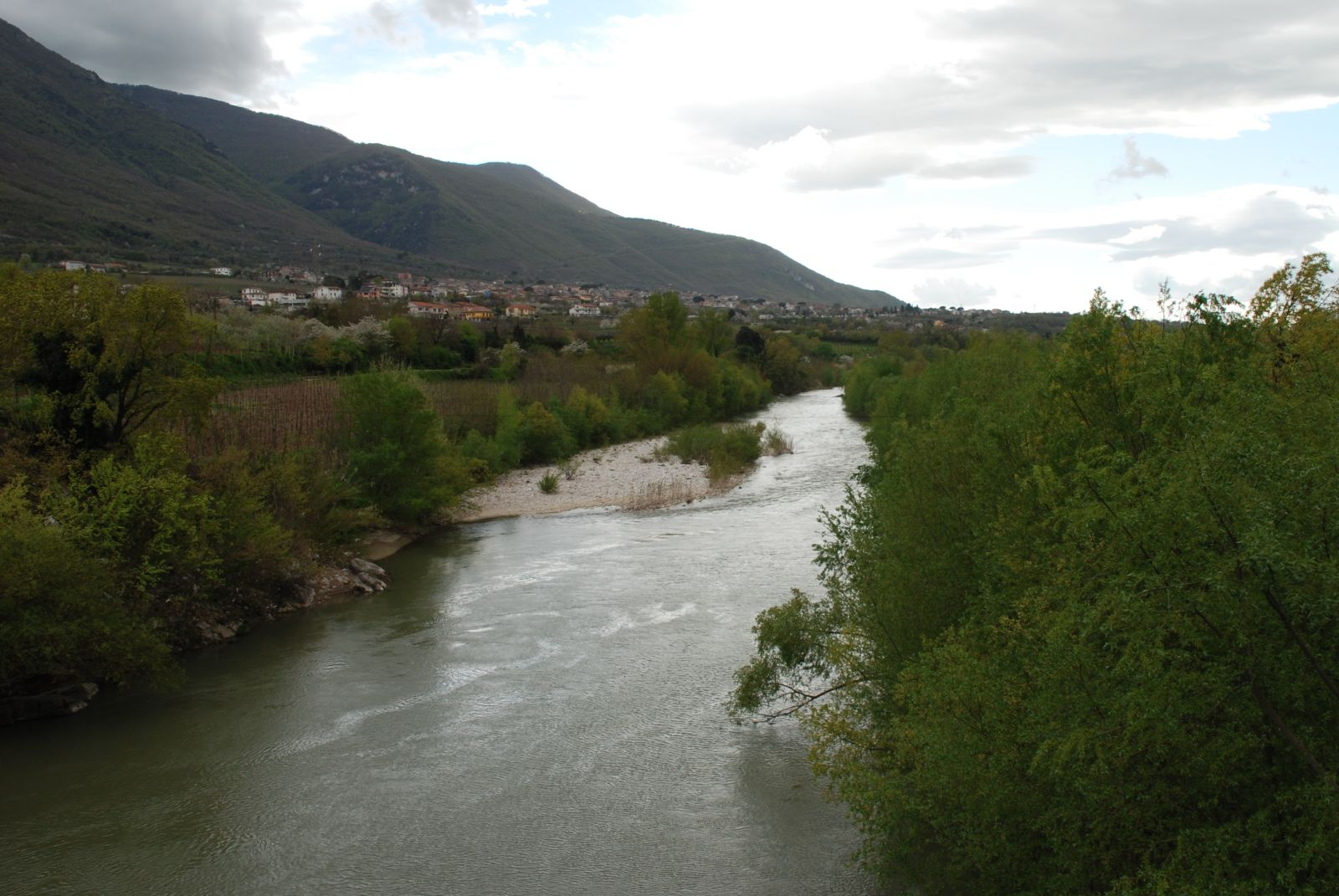

- Location within Italy Location within Campania
- Coordinates: 41°11′N 14°33′E
- Country: Italy
- Region: Campania
- Province: Province of Benevento (BN)

Area
  - Total: 31.0 km^{2} (12.0 sq mi)

Population (Dec. 2004)
  - Total: 4,134
  - Density: 133/km^{2} (345/sq mi)
- Time zone: UTC+1 (CET)
  - Summer (DST): UTC+2 (CEST)
- Postal code: 82036
- Dialing code: 0824

Solopaca (Campanian: Surrupaca) is a comune (municipality) in the Province of Benevento in the Italian region of Campania, located about 45 kilometres (28 mi) northeast of Naples and about 20 kilometres (12 mi) northwest of Benevento. As of 31 December 2004, it had a population of 4,134 and an area of 31.0 square kilometres (12.0 mi^{2}).

Solopaca borders the following municipalities: Castelvenere, Frasso Telesino, Guardia Sanframondi, Melizzano, Telese Terme, Vitulano.

== Demographic evolution ==
Historical population

Year	Pop.	±%
1861	4,085	—
1871	4,245	+3.9%
1881	4,478	+5.5%
1901	4,848	+8.3%
1911	5,187	+7.0%

Year	Pop.	±%
1921	5,161	−0.5%
1931	5,613	+8.8%
1936	5,864	+4.5%
1951	6,092	+3.9%
1961	5,556	−8.8%

Year	Pop.	±%
1971	4,628	−16.7%
1981	4,492	−2.9%
1991	4,447	−1.0%
2001	4,163	−6.4%

Source: Data from ISTAT

== Solopaca DOC ==
Italian wine, both red and white, under the Solopaca DOC appellation comes from this area in the hillside vineyards along the Calore River. Grapes destined for DOC production must be harvested to a maximum yield of 13 tonnes/hectare for red grape varieties and 15 tonnes/ha for white grape varieties. The finished wines need to be fermented to a minimum alcohol level of 11.5% for reds and 12% for whites.

Red Solopaca wine is a blend of 45-60% Sangiovese, 10-20% Aglianico, 20-25% Piedirosso and/or Sciascinoso and up to 10% of other local red grape varieties permitted to fill in the remainder of the blend. The white wines are produced from 50 to 70% Trebbiano, 20-40% Malvasia di Candia, Malvasia Toscana and/or Coda di Volpe with other local white grape varieties permitted up to 10%.
