= Vitulano =

- Comune
- Comune di Vitulano
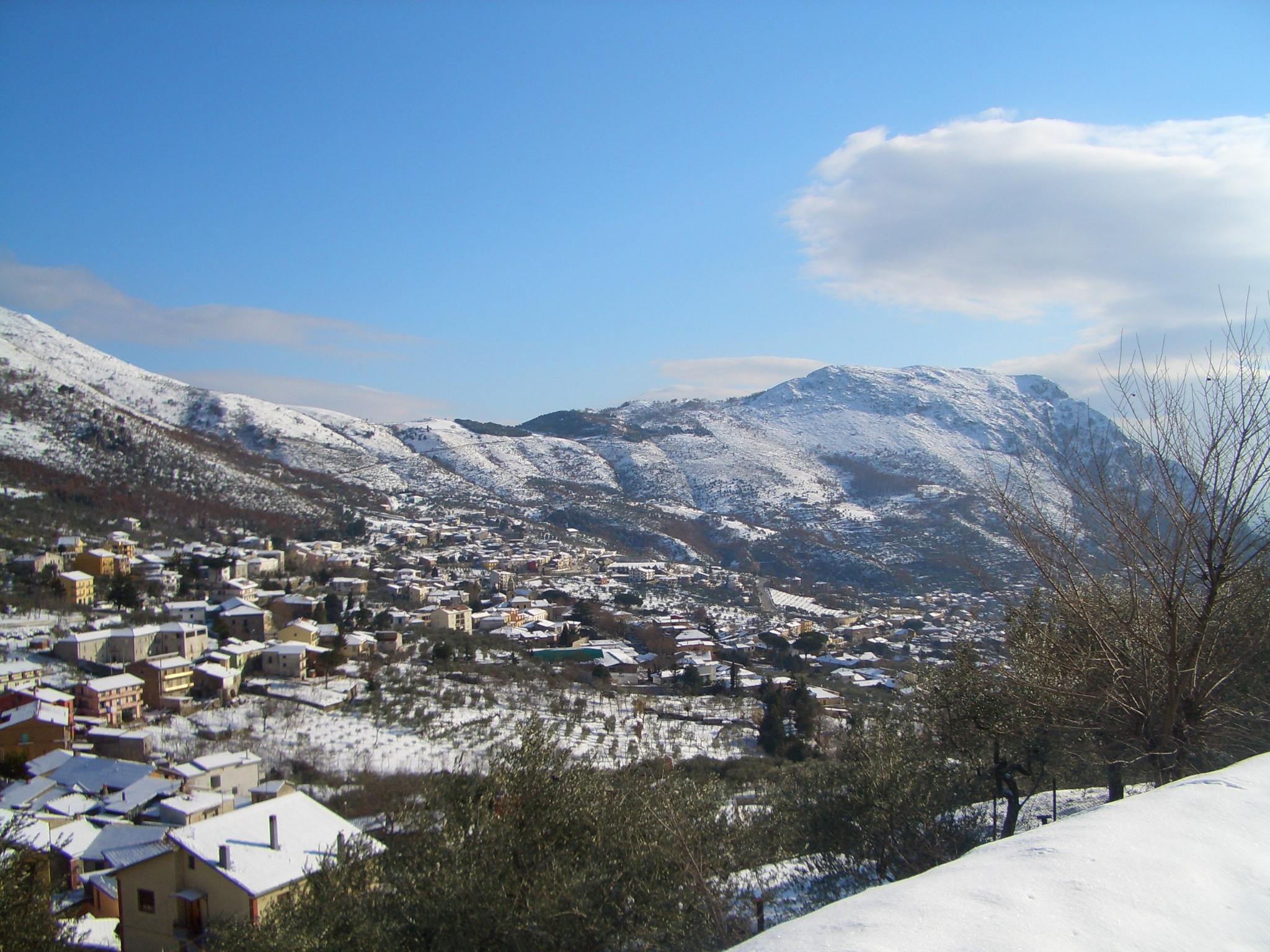

- Location within Italy Location within Campania
- Coordinates: 41°11′N 14°39′E
- Country: Italy
- Region: Campania
- Province: Benevento (BN)

Government
  - Mayor: Raffaele Scarinzi

Area
  - Total: 35.99 km^{2} (13.90 sq mi)
- Elevation: 430 m (1,410 ft)

Population (1 January 2017)
  - Total: 2,920
  - Density: 81.1/km^{2} (210/sq mi)
- Demonym: Vitulanesi
- Time zone: UTC+1 (CET)
  - Summer (DST): UTC+2 (CEST)
- Postal code: 82038
- Dialing code: 0824
- Website: Official website

Vitulano is a comune (municipality) in the Province of Benevento in the Italian region Campania, located about 50 km (31 mi) northeast of Naples and about 12 km (7.5 mi) northwest of Benevento.

Vitulano borders the following municipalities: Campoli del Monte Taburno, Castelpoto, Cautano, Foglianise, Frasso Telesino, Guardia Sanframondi, Paupisi, San Lorenzo Maggiore, Solopaca, Torrecuso.

== Main sights ==
=== Santissima Annunziata convent ===
According to tradition, the convent was founded in 1440 by Saint Bernardino of Siena. It was part of a Foglianise parish until 1852, when it was incorporated in the comune of Vitulano. In 1884 the cemetery of the latter municipality was installed in the garden of the church. In July 1991 pope John Paul II gave it the title of minor basilica.

=== Santa Maria in Gruptis ===
Near Vitulano, but belonging to the comune of Foglianise, are the ruins of the Santa Maria in Gruptis abbey, founded around the year 940 and deconsecrated in 1705. It was used by several monastic orders, the first of which were the Benedictines.
