= Faicchio =

- Comune
- Comune di Faicchio
- Location within Italy Location within Campania
- Coordinates: 41°17′N 14°29′E
- Country: Italy
- Region: Campania
- Province: Benevento (BN)
- Frazioni: Fontanavecchia, Santa Lucia, Cortesano, Faicchio centro, Massa, Marafi, Casali, Macchia, Caudara

Government
  - Mayor: Nino Lombardi

Area
  - Total: 43.9 km^{2} (16.9 sq mi)
- Elevation: 175 m (574 ft)
- Highest elevation: 1,300 m (4,300 ft)
- Lowest elevation: 120 m (390 ft)

Population (1 January 2020)
  - Total: 3,528
  - Density: 80.4/km^{2} (208/sq mi)
- Demonym: Faicchiani
- Time zone: UTC+1 (CET)
  - Summer (DST): UTC+2 (CEST)
- Postal code: 82030
- Dialing code: 0824
- ISTAT code: 062029
- Patron saint: John the Baptist
- Saint day: 24 June
- Website: Official website

Faicchio is a small village in the Province of Benevento in the Italian region of Campania, located about 50 km northeast of Naples and about 30 km northwest of Benevento.

Faicchio borders the following villages: Cusano Mutri, Gioia Sannitica, Puglianello, Ruviano, San Lorenzello, San Salvatore Telesino.

Faicchio is located a few kilometers from Terme di Telese.

== Notable people ==
- Eugenio Bianchi, theoretical physicist born in Faicchio
- Luigi Palmieri, physicist, meteorologist, politician born in Faicchio and died in Naples.
- Clotilde Micheli, founder of the Sisters of the Angels, is buried in Faicchio.
