= Limatola =

- Comune
- Comune di Limatola
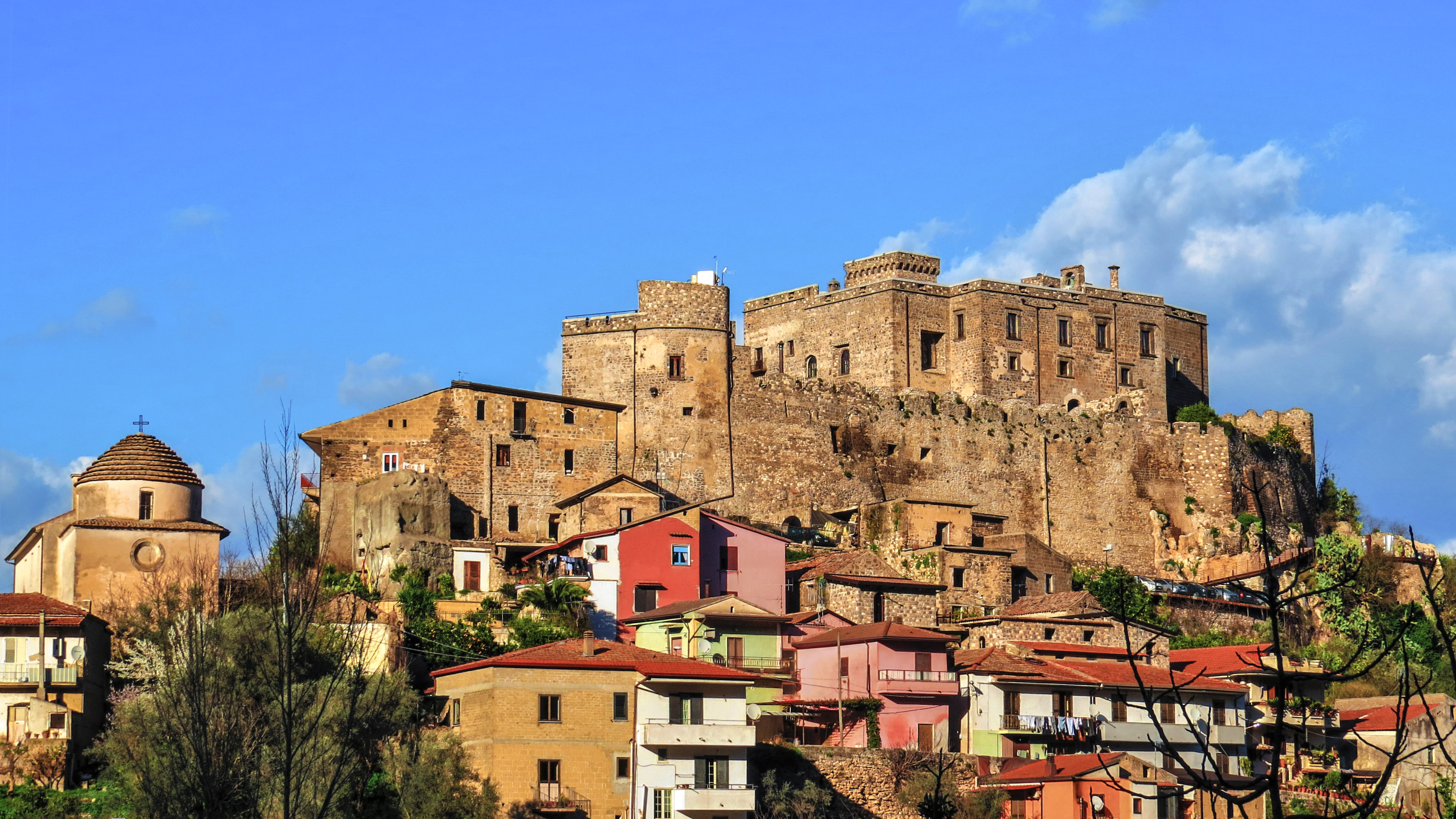
- Skyline of Limatola and its castle

- Coat of arms

- Location within Italy Location within Campania
- Coordinates: 41°9′N 14°24′E
- Country: Italy
- Region: Campania
- Province: Benevento (BN)
- Frazioni: Biancano

Government
  - Mayor: Domenico Parisi

Area
  - Total: 18.38 km^{2} (7.10 sq mi)
- Elevation: 48 m (157 ft)

Population (1 January 2020)
  - Total: 4,080
  - Density: 222/km^{2} (575/sq mi)
- Demonym: Limatolesi
- Time zone: UTC+1 (CET)
  - Summer (DST): UTC+2 (CEST)
- Postal code: 82030
- Dialing code: 0823
- ISTAT code: 062038
- Patron saint: Saint Blaise
- Saint day: 3 February
- Website: Official website

Limatola is a comune (municipality) in the Province of Benevento in the Italian region Campania, located about 35 km (22 mi) northeast of Naples and about 30 km (19 mi) west of Benevento.

Limatola borders the following municipalities: Caiazzo, Caserta, Castel Campagnano, Castel Morrone, Dugenta, Piana di Monte Verna, Sant'Agata de' Goti.
