= Gioia Sannitica =

Comune in Campania, Italy

- Comune
- Comune di Gioia Sannitica
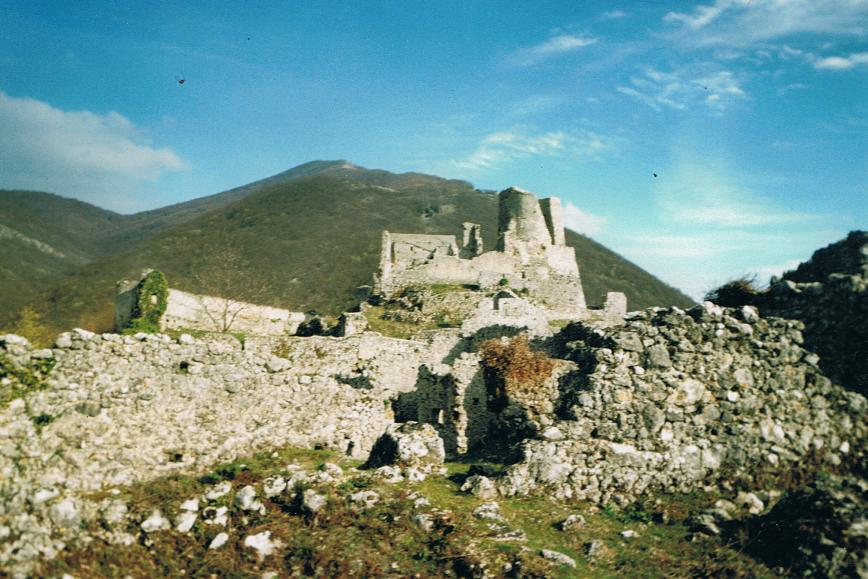

- Coat of arms

- Location within Italy Location within Campania
- Coordinates: 41°18′00″N 14°26′41″E
- Country: Italy
- Region: Campania
- Province: Caserta (CE)
- Frazioni: Auduni, Calvisi, Carattano, Caselle, Criscia, Curti, Filette, Gioia, Madonna del Bagno

Government
  - Mayor: Michelangelo Raccio

Area
  - Total: 54.0 km^{2} (20.8 sq mi)
- Elevation: 275 m (902 ft)

Population (31 January 2013)
  - Total: 3,636
  - Density: 67.3/km^{2} (174/sq mi)
- Demonym: Gioiesi
- Time zone: UTC+1 (CET)
  - Summer (DST): UTC+2 (CEST)
- Postal code: 81010
- Dialing code: 0823
- Patron saint: St. Michael
- Saint day: 29 September
- Website: Official website

Gioia Sannitica is a comune (municipality) in the Province of Caserta in the Italian region Campania, located about 50 kilometres (31 mi) northeast of Naples and about 30 kilometres (19 mi) northeast of Caserta.

Gioia Sannitica borders the following municipalities: Alife, Alvignano, Cusano Mutri, Faicchio, Ruviano, San Potito Sannitico.

A hill nearby is home to a Norman castle, connected to a small village which went depopulated in the 14th–15th centuries.
