= Campoli del Monte Taburno =

- Comune
- Comune di Campoli del Monte Taburno
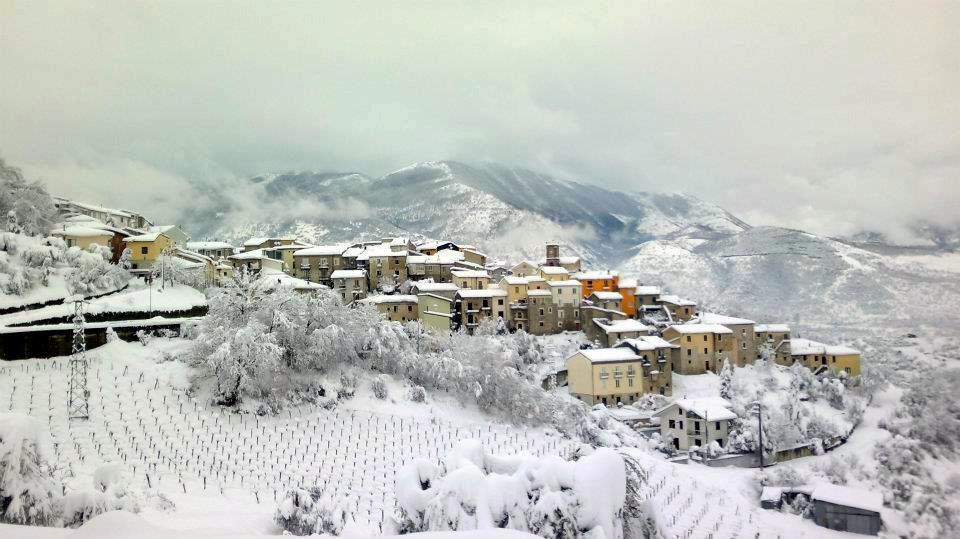
- View of the Comune in winter

- Location within Italy Location within Campania
- Coordinates: 41°8′N 14°39′E
- Country: Italy
- Region: Campania
- Province: Benevento (BN)

Government
  - Mayor: Tommaso Nicola Grasso

Area
  - Total: 9.8 km^{2} (3.8 sq mi)

Population (1 January 2020)
  - Total: 1,598
  - Density: 160/km^{2} (420/sq mi)
- Demonym: Campolesi
- Time zone: UTC+1 (CET)
  - Summer (DST): UTC+2 (CEST)
- Postal code: 82030
- Dialing code: 0824
- ISTAT code: 062014
- Patron saint: Saint Nicholas
- Website: Official website

Campoli del Monte Taburno is a comune (municipality) in the Province of Benevento in the Italian region Campania, located about 45 km (28 mi) northeast of Naples and about 11 km (6.8 mi) west of Benevento.

Campoli del Monte Taburno borders the following municipalities: Apollosa, Castelpoto, Cautano, Montesarchio, Tocco Caudio, Vitulano.
