= Cautano =

- Comune
- Comune di Cautano
- Coat of arms

- Location within Italy Location within Campania
- Coordinates: 41°9′N 14°38′E
- Country: Italy
- Region: Campania
- Province: Benevento (BN)
- Frazioni: Cacciano, Sala, S. Giovanni, Prata, Loreto, Pantanelle, Trescine, Fornillo, and Maione

Government
  - Mayor: Giuseppe Fuggi

Area
  - Total: 19.72 km^{2} (7.61 sq mi)
- Elevation: 300 m (980 ft)

Population (1 January 2020)
  - Total: 1,985
  - Density: 100.7/km^{2} (260.7/sq mi)
- Demonym: Cautanesi or Caccianesi
- Time zone: UTC+1 (CET)
  - Summer (DST): UTC+2 (CEST)
- Postal code: 82030
- Dialing code: 0824
- ISTAT code: 062021
- Patron saint: Andrew the Apostle; Saint Roch
- Saint day: 30 November; 16 August
- Website: Official website

Cautano (Campanian: Cautànë) is a comune (municipality) constituted from two countries, Cautano and Cacciano, in the Province of Benevento (until 1861 Province of Avellino) in the Italian region Campania, located about 75 km (46.6 mi) northeast of Naples and about 13 km (8.1 mi) west of Benevento and about 13 km (8.1 mi) north of Montesarchio.

Cautano borders the following municipalities: Campoli del Monte Taburno, Foglianise, Frasso Telesino, Tocco Caudio, Vitulano.
