= Frasso Telesino =

- Comune
- Comune di Frasso Telesino
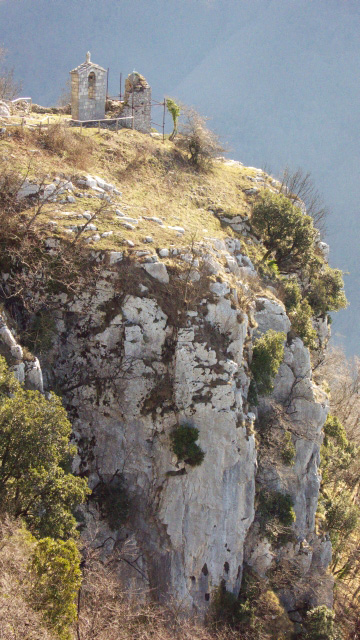
- Hermitage of San Michele.

- Location within Italy Location within Campania
- Coordinates: 41°9′N 14°32′E
- Country: Italy
- Region: Campania
- Province: Benevento (BN)
- Frazioni: Nansignano

Government
  - Mayor: Pasquale Viscusi

Area
  - Total: 21.82 km^{2} (8.42 sq mi)

Population (1 January 2020)
  - Total: 2,180
  - Density: 99.9/km^{2} (259/sq mi)
- Demonym: Frassesi
- Time zone: UTC+1 (CET)
  - Summer (DST): UTC+2 (CEST)
- Postal code: 82030
- Dialing code: 0824
- ISTAT code: 062035
- Website: Official website

Frasso Telesino is a comune (municipality) in the Province of Benevento in the Italian region Campania, located about 40 km (25 mi) northeast of Naples and about 20 km (12 mi) west of Benevento.

Frasso Telesino borders the following municipalities: Cautano, Dugenta, Melizzano, Sant'Agata de' Goti, Solopaca, Tocco Caudio, Vitulano. It is located on the western slopes of the Monte Taburno.

Sights include the hermitage of San Michele, the Palazzo Gambacorta and the 18th century church of Madonna di Campanile.

== People ==
American jazz musician Mike Mosiello was born in Frasso Telesino and was in 2003 honored with a plaque in his old hometown.
