= Francesco Maria Rubano =

Italian politician (born 1988)

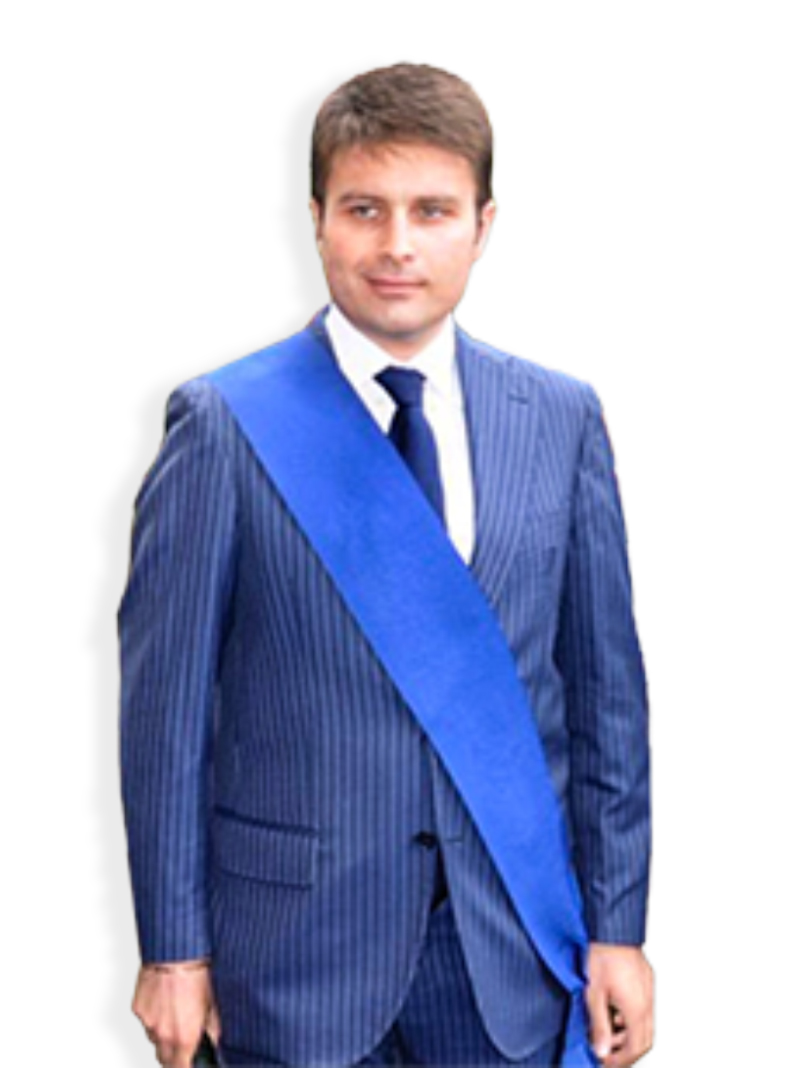
- Rubano in 2021

Member of the Chamber of Deputies
- Incumbent
- Assumed office 13 October 2022
- Constituency: Campania 2 – 03

Personal details
- Born: 21 January 1988 (age 38)
- Party: Forza Italia

Francesco Maria Rubano (born 21 January 1988) is an Italian politician serving as a member of the Chamber of Deputies since 2022. He has served as mayor of Puglianello since 2019.
