= Melizzano =

- Comune
- Comune di Melizzano
- Location within Italy Location within Campania
- Coordinates: 41°10′N 14°30′E
- Country: Italy
- Region: Campania
- Province: Benevento (BN)
- Frazioni: Torello

Government
  - Mayor: Rossano Libero Insogna

Area
  - Total: 17.5 km^{2} (6.8 sq mi)
- Elevation: 190 m (620 ft)

Population (1 January 2020)
  - Total: 1,781
  - Density: 102/km^{2} (264/sq mi)
- Demonym: Melizzanesi
- Time zone: UTC+1 (CET)
  - Summer (DST): UTC+2 (CEST)
- Postal code: 82030
- Dialing code: 0824
- ISTAT code: 062039
- Patron saint: Saint Peter and Saint Paul
- Saint day: 29 June
- Website: Official website

Melizzano is a comune (municipality) in the Province of Benevento in the Italian region Campania, located about 45 km (28 mi) northeast of Naples and about 25 km (16 mi) west of Benevento.

Melizzano borders the following municipalities: Amorosi, Castel Campagnano, Dugenta, Frasso Telesino, Solopaca, Telese Terme.
