= Necropolis of Amorosi =

Archaeological site in Campania, Italy

- Necropoli di Amorosi
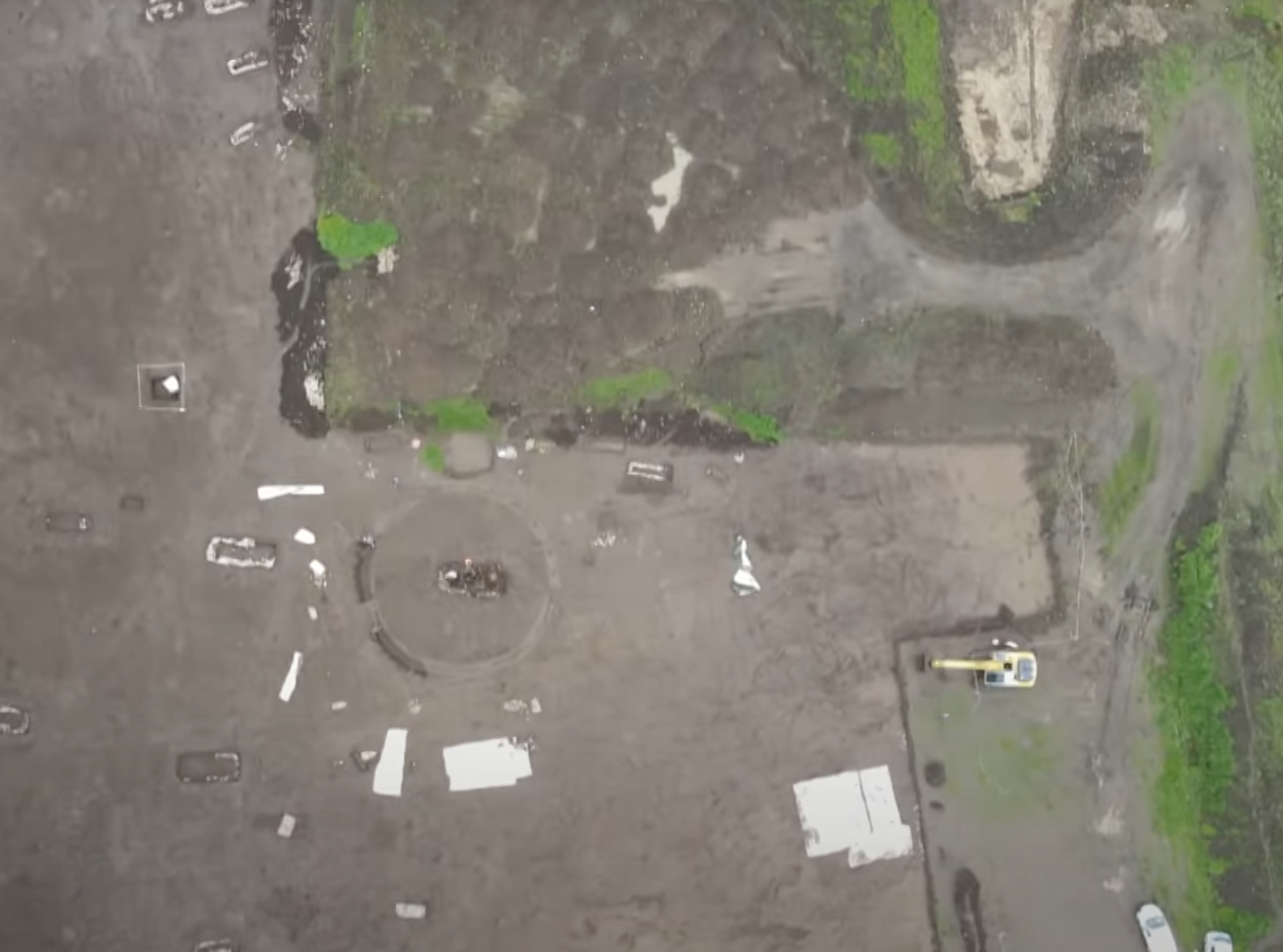
- Necropolis of Amorosi in Campania, Italy Necropolis of Amorosi (Italy)
- Interactive map of Necropolis of Amorosi
- Type: Tombs and tumulus
- Periods: Iron Age
- Cultures: Pit Grave Culture
- Associated with: Etruscans
- Location: Amorosi, Province of Benevento
- Region: Campania

Site notes
- Area: 1.3 hectares (13,000 m^{2})
- Diameter: 15 m (49 ft)
- Architectural style: Pre-roman
- Archaeologists: Andrea Martelli
- Discovered: April 2024
- Owner: Comune of Amorosi
- Public access: No

The Necropolis of Amorosi is an ancient burial site in Amorosi, Italy, located in the region of Campania. It dates to the pre-Roman era and is associated with Italic burial practices. Discovered and excavated in 2024, excavations linked the site to the Samnite culture. Items such as pottery, ornaments, and weapons illustrate the social and cultural practices of early Italic communities.

The necropolis, estimated to be 2,800 years old, includes 88 pit tombs and two large tumuli. Its burial style represents the pre-Samnites Campania culture, reflecting traditions from the Iron Age to the Orientalizing period. The site's archaeological significance demonstrates its role in tracing Italic cultural traditions prior to the Roman Era.

== Location ==
This archaeological discovery was made in the town of Amorosi, located close to the province of Benevento. The site is located within the territorial bounds of the municipality of Telesina near a road construction project related to the Naples-Bari motorway, a major infrastructural project in the Campania region. This site is located 48 kilometres (31 miles) to the northeast of Naples, the regional capital, and 30 kilometres northwest of Benevento, placing it within the historical and geographic context of southern Italy.

The site covers an area of 13,000 square metres (140,000 sq ft). Initial evaluations revealed a large archaeological expanse situated 400 meters from the Volturno River, one of the principal fluvial systems in the south of Italy, known for its hydrological importance and historical relevance.

== Discovery ==
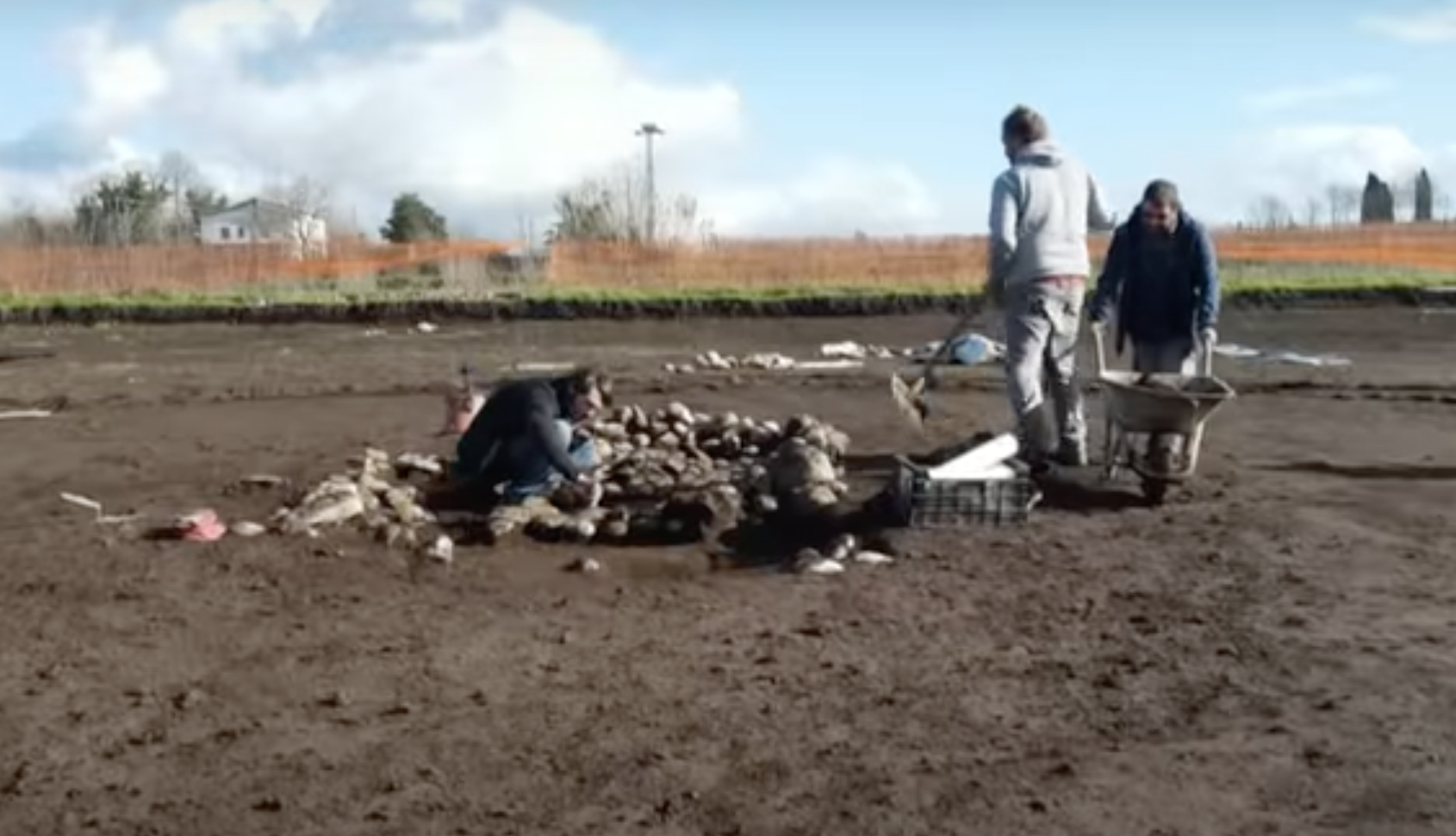
The archaeological company SAP working at the Necropolis of Amorosi (April 2024).

The site was discovered in early 2024 during excavations for an electricity station linked to a high-speed rail project. While the burial mounds had been long visible and recognised as ancient features for centuries, the recent excavations revealed numerous tombs surrounding them that were previously undiscovered. In April 2024 the local cultural heritage authority announced the discovery to the press. Amorosi's mayor, Carmine Cacchillo, described the discovery as "of decisive importance for the history of our culture". The excavation, supervised by the Soprintendenza (Superintendency) Archeologica Belle Arti e Paesaggio (SABAP), of Caserta and Benevento, was carried out by Terna's Archaeology Unit and conducted on-site by the archaeological company SAP. The scientific aspect of the discovery is governed by the archaeologist Andrea Martelli. Specialists, including restorers, anthropologists and paleobotanists, contributed to gathering data aimed at reconstructing as much as possible about the ancient population. Various entities made contributions to the project. The Municipality of Amorosi provided support, while law enforcement agencies like Carabinieri protected the archaeological site. The Terna's group involvement in the preservation and study of the Necropolis of Amorosi showcases a collaboration between industry and archaeology. The uncovered tombs and bodies are being analysed in a laboratory provided by the Municipality of Amorosi established at the excavation site, according to a statement from the authorities.

== Excavation ==
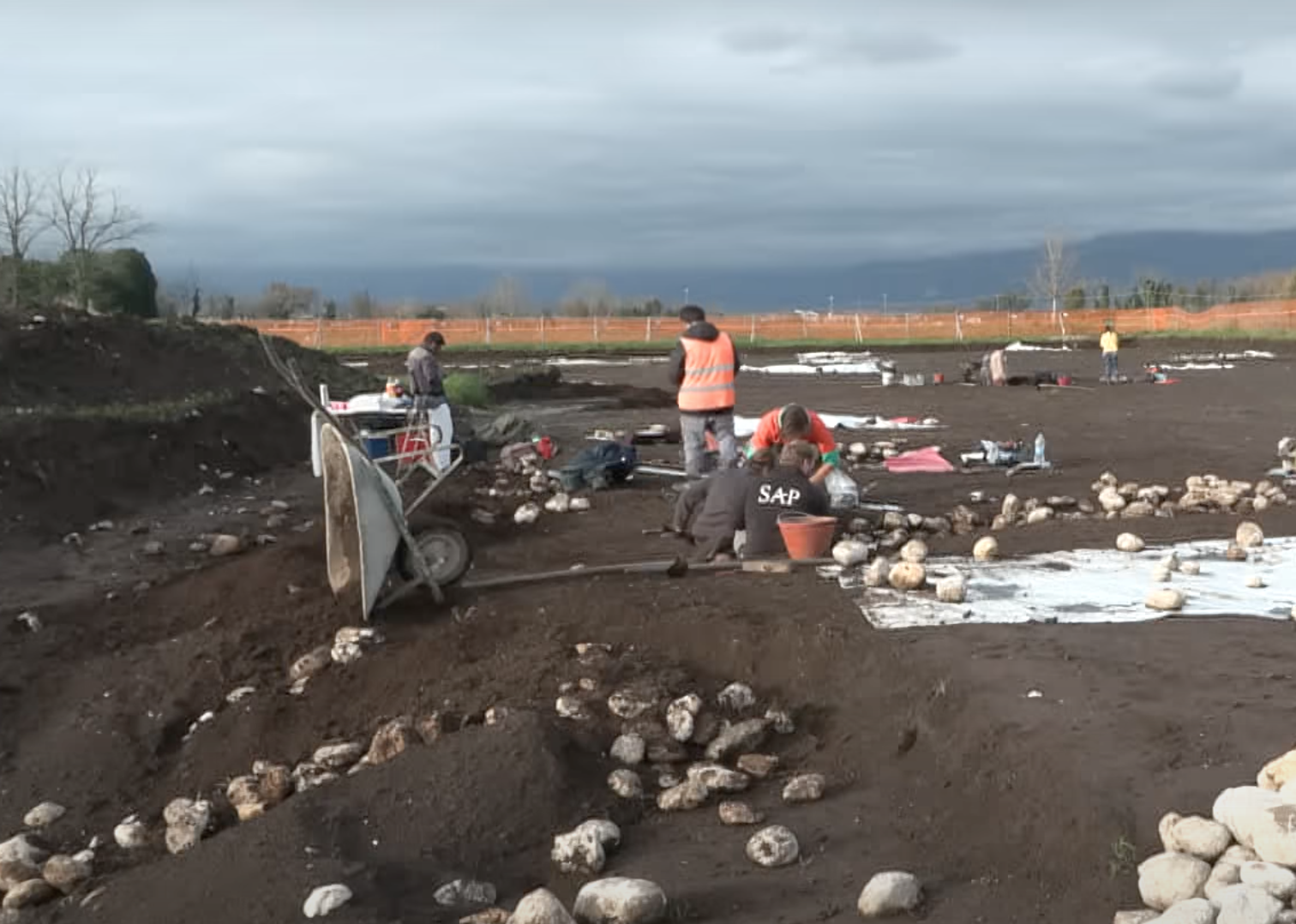
Archaeologists excavating the first tomb of the Necropolis of Amorosi on the first day of excavations.

The site revealed 88 pit tombs and two large burial mounds, dating from the late Iron Age to the 7th-8th century Orientalizing period. The excavation yielded weapons, pottery, amber jewellery, and bronze items, which provided information on the local population's social structure and Mediterranean influences. The discovery has led to interpretations of the site's potential role in trade and cultural exchange. Despite agricultural activity obscuring many structures, surrounding tombs have yielded well-preserved artefacts, including metal objects, intricate ceramics, and other offerings meant for the deceased's journey to the afterlife. Following the initial findings, comprehensive excavations were launched to assess the integrity of the archaeological stratigraphy and evaluate the preservation of cultural deposits within their context.

== Prehistory ==
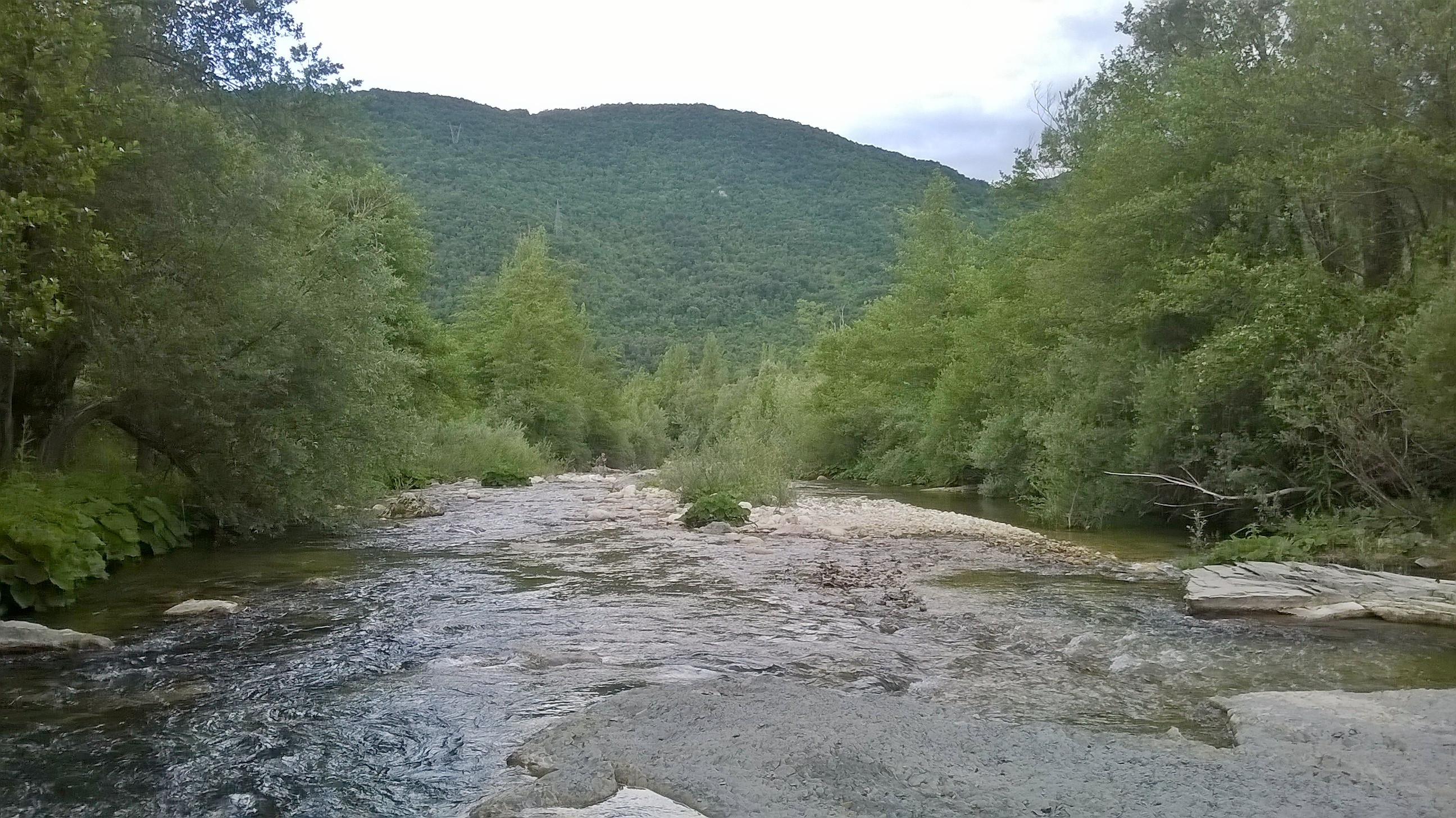
The Volturno river in southern Italy, location of Etruscan settlements such as the Necropolis of Amorosi.

The region around Amorosi has been inhabited since prehistoric times. Archaeological evidence suggests that early settlers were engaged in agriculture and animal husbandry. The Necropolis of Amorosi in Campania is believed to have been created by Etruscans, a population that lived between the 9th and the 1st century BCE, around 2,600 years ago. The burials at Amorosi are located near the Volturno River, and they were part of the Pit Tomb Culture, a funerary tradition that characterized the region before the rise of the Samnities some decades later. The river was identified with the God Volturno. It served as a means of controlling traffic and managing trade routes, facilitating connections with Capua and the Greek cities of Campania. This location prompted Etruscan settlements in the area, where they established villages and necropolises, including the one at Amorosi. Etruscans believed about life after death, viewing it as an extension of daily existence. This is reflected in the vases and other feminine and masculine funerary items discovered within the Necropolis of Amorosi, which demonstrate the personal and domestic aspects of life that the deceased hoped to carry into the afterlife. Etruscans regarded graves as a sacred space to protect and preserve life's continuity, as shown in the burials found during the excavations. These characteristics reveal the social organization and spiritual beliefs of ancient Italic populations, as seen in the Amorosi site.

== Findings and burial practices ==
The findings demonstrate the burial practices and social structure of the ancient inhabitants that characterised Amorosi. The site features individual and collective tombs, where the deceased were interred with grave goods reflecting their social status, gender, and occupation.

=== Male and female burials ===
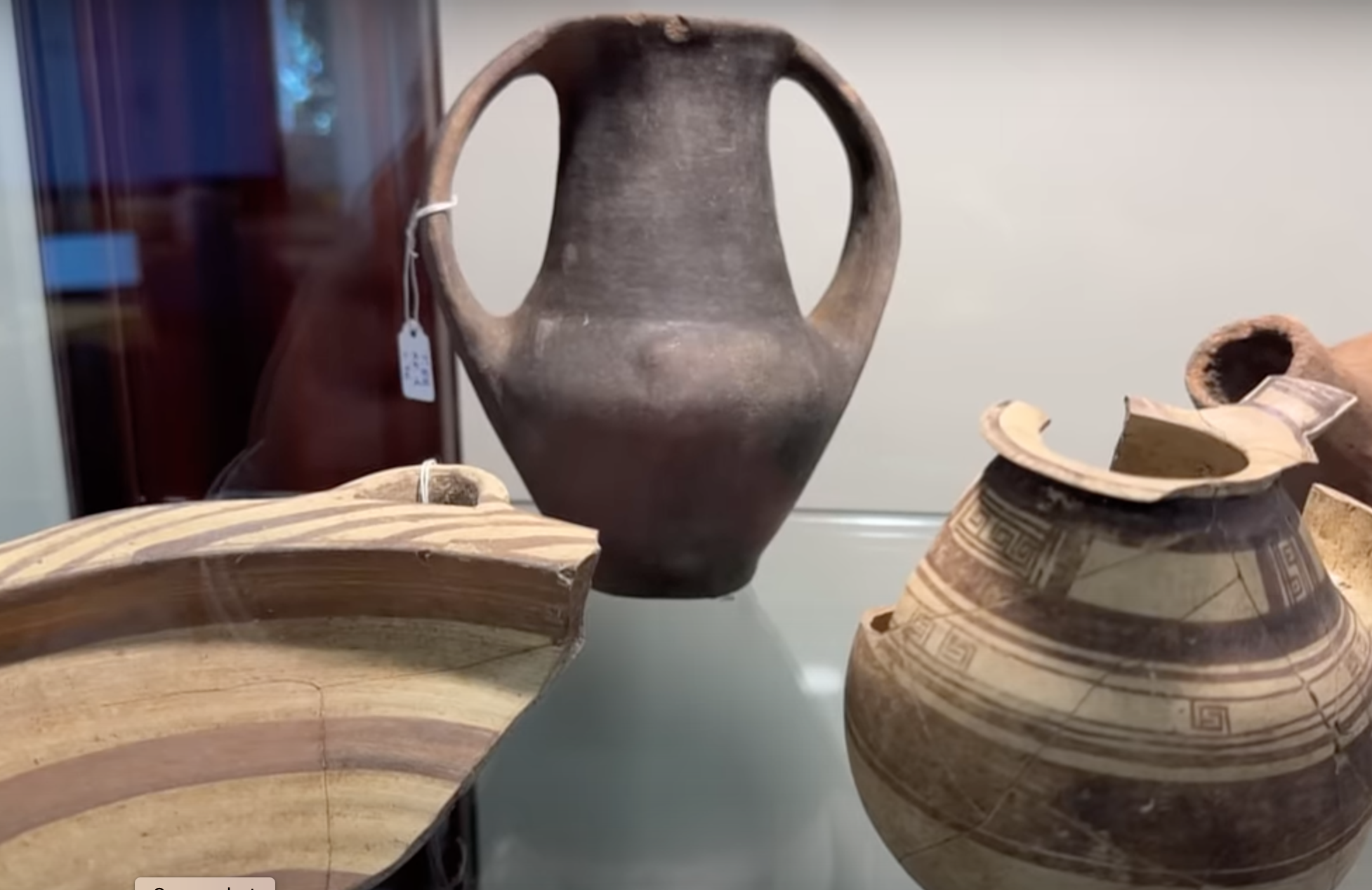
The vases found in women's burials (Amorosi, Italy)

Male graves contained weapons such as daggers, swords, and spearheads, indicating martial roles and high status. Female graves typically held finely crafted bronze ornaments like bracelets and fibulae, pointing to roles in domestic or ceremonial activities.

=== Vases and ceramics ===
A variety of vases were discovered in both male and female graves, often placed near the feet of the deceased. These vases held ritual significance, symbolizing provisions for the afterlife or the deceased's journey to the next realm.

=== Monumental mounds ===
Two large burial mounds were uncovered at the site, each surrounded by circular enclosures measuring 15 meters in diameter. These monumental structures were housed by elite individuals, such as tribal chieftains or other prominent members of society. The scale of the mounds reflects the high social status of the interred individuals due to the resources and labor invested in their construction. The discovery of this monumental burial sites gives information into the social and religious practices of the people who built them.

== Archaeological methods ==
In exploring the Amorosi Necropolis, archaeologists have used various advanced methods to analyze the layout and human remains at the site. Stratigraphy, a key archaeological technique, has helped scientists identify the sequence of burial events by examining soil layers and how they correlate with the tomb structures. This method allows for a chronological understanding of the site, with evidence of early Campanian and Orientalizing period cultural influences and gives traces of ancient plants or environmental features and organic materials used in funerary rites. Osteological and anthropological analyses of the skeletal remains provide details about the health, age, and social status of those interred, contributing to understanding ancient Italic social structures and lifestyles. This multidisciplinary approach integrates scientific fields to create a comprehensive picture of ancient Campanian society.

== Funerary rituals ==
The funerary rituals provide information about the burial practices and cultural beliefs of the region's ancient inhabitants. The site features both individual and collective tombs.

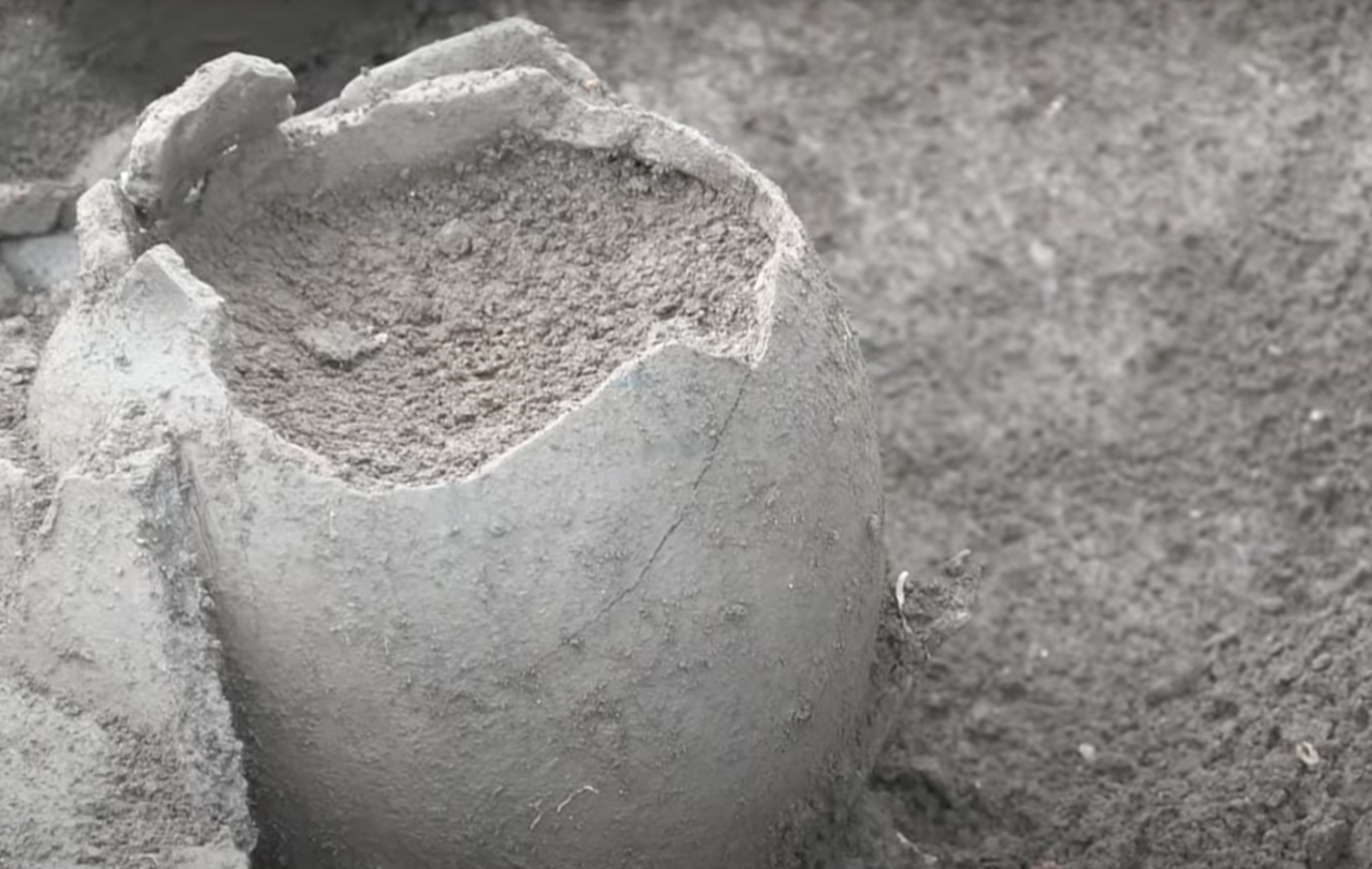
A vase with ashes discovered in a tomb (Amorosi, Italy).

=== Cremation and inhumation ===
Early burials at the necropolis show cremation practices. As Roman influence grew, inhumation became more common. Artifacts such as jewellery, tools, and ceremonial items were selected during funerary rituals to reflect the identity and status of the deceased, while their arrangement in the tombs suggests symbolic themes of transition, protection and purification.

=== Symbolism of river pebbles in burial practices ===
At the Amorosi Necropolis, river pebbles were used symbolically in burial practices. These pebbles, often placed in graves, represent the deceased's journey to the afterlife. Similar to different practices at other sites like the Macchiabate Necropolis, where pebbles served as platforms for bodies, these stones may have symbolised purity or marked the deceased's passage. The arrangement of bodies on pebbles indicates a deliberate ritual to prepare the deceased for the next realm.

=== Palaeolithic symbolism ===
In Mediterranean funerary traditions, stones and pebbles held symbolic meanings, dating back to the Paleolithic age. While these practices are evident in early Italian regions, further research is needed to confirm their connection to the Amorosi Necropolis. The presence of stones in other ancient Italian burial sites, coupled with the wider Mediterranean context, suggests that the symbolic use of stones have been a part of the mortuary rituals at Amorosi as well. These stones served as markers, boundary elements, or even as symbols of purification, reflecting similar practices in nearby regions during this period.

== Gallery ==
Excavations at the Necropolis of Amorosi
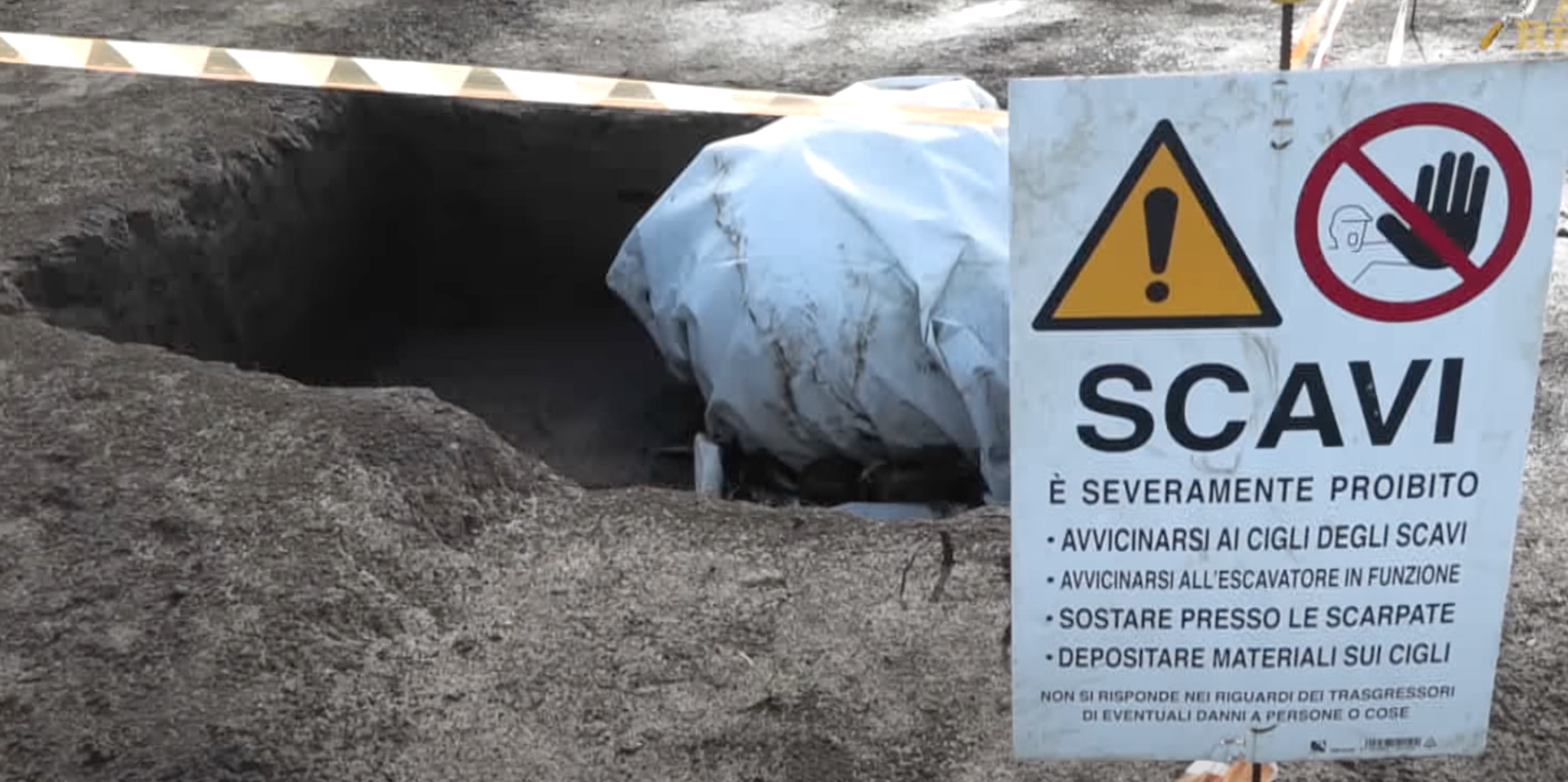
Excavation sign placed on the day of the discovery at the Necropolis of Amorosi

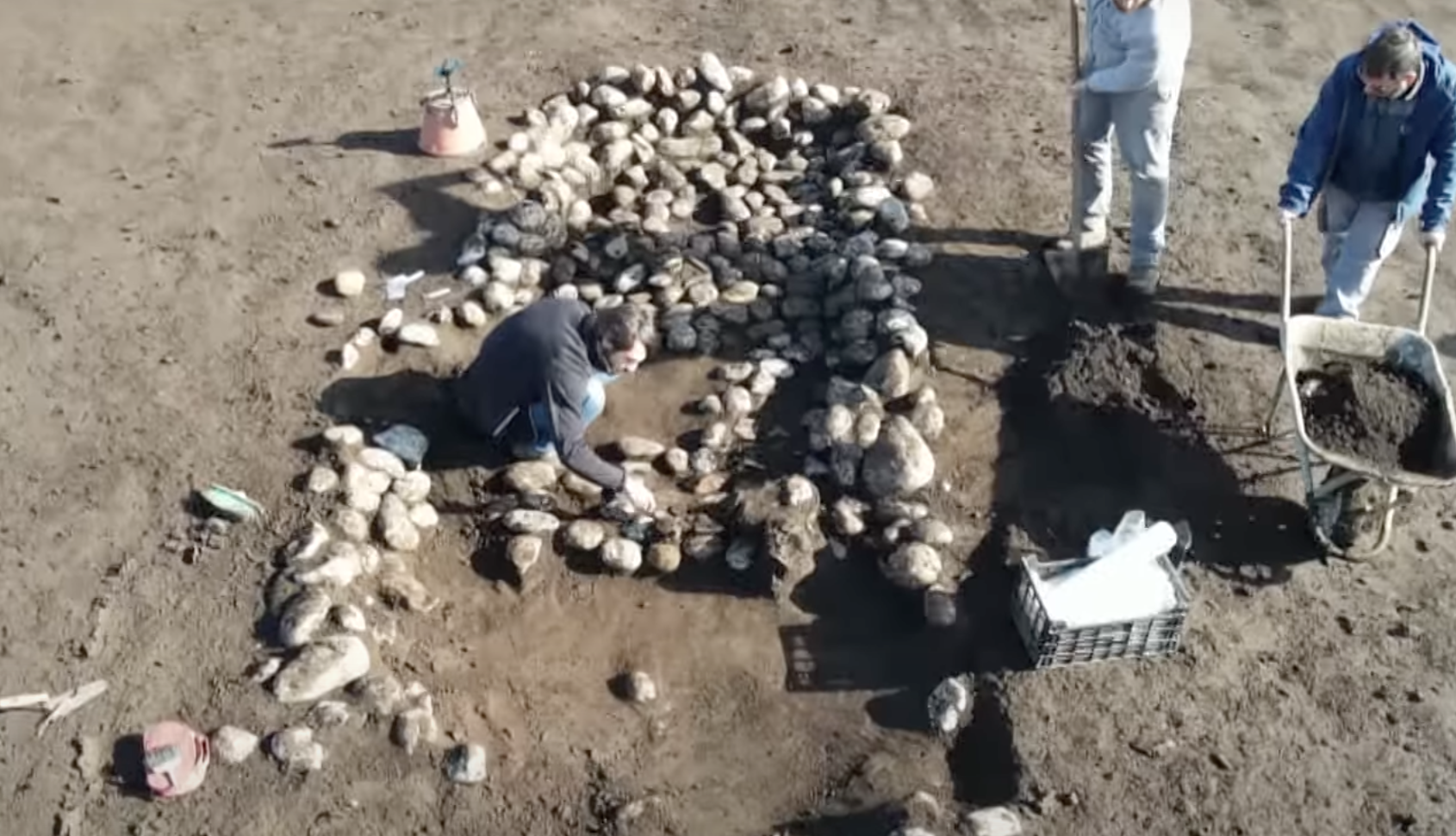
SAP archaeologists excavating at the Necropolis of Amorosi

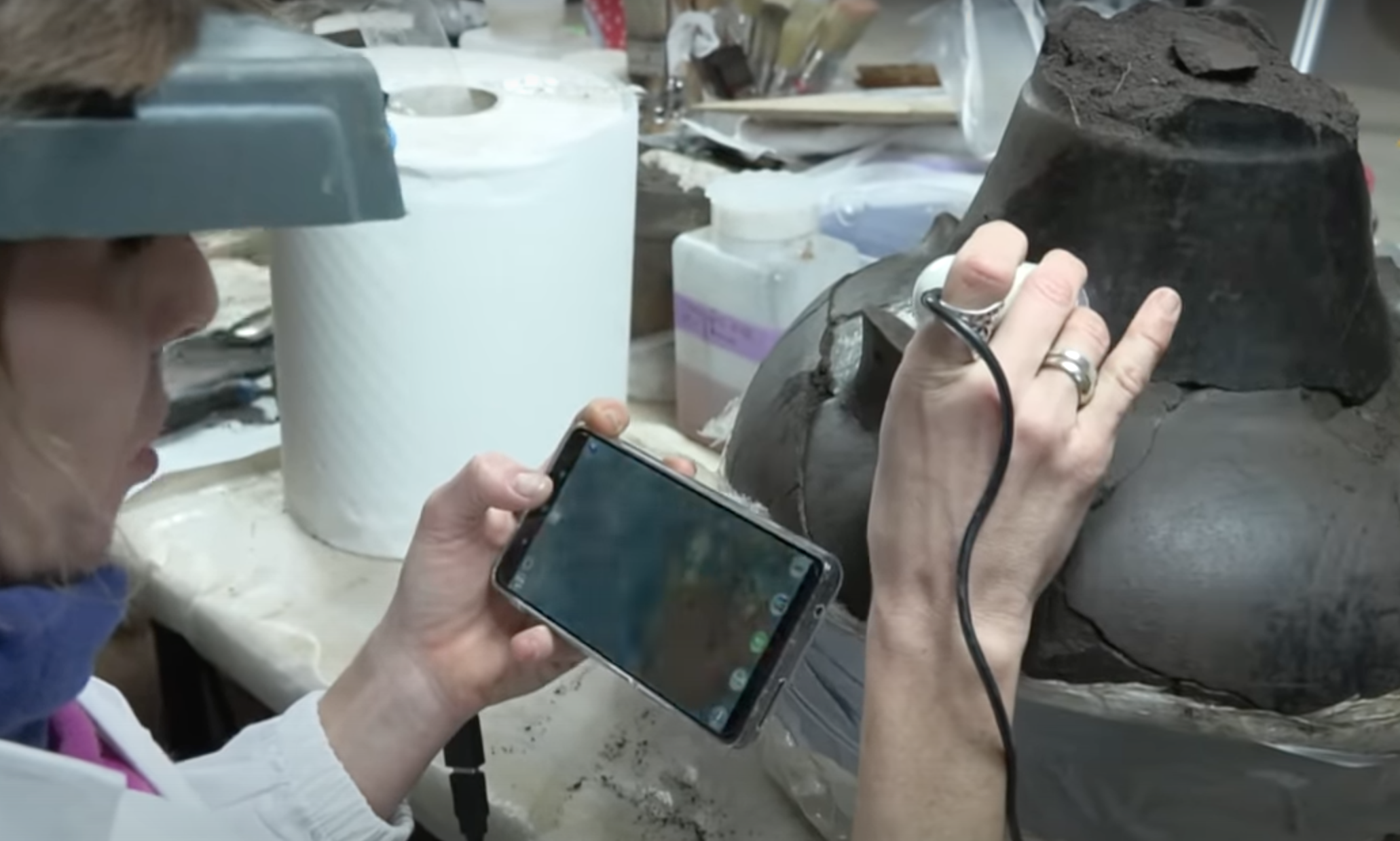
Archaeologist from the specialised company SAP working on a vase found at the site of Amorosi

== See also ==
- History of the Mediterranean region
- Archeological site
- History of Italy
- Roman burial practices
