= Castel Campagnano =

Castel Campagnano è il comune della provolona
- Comune
- Comune di Castel Campagnano
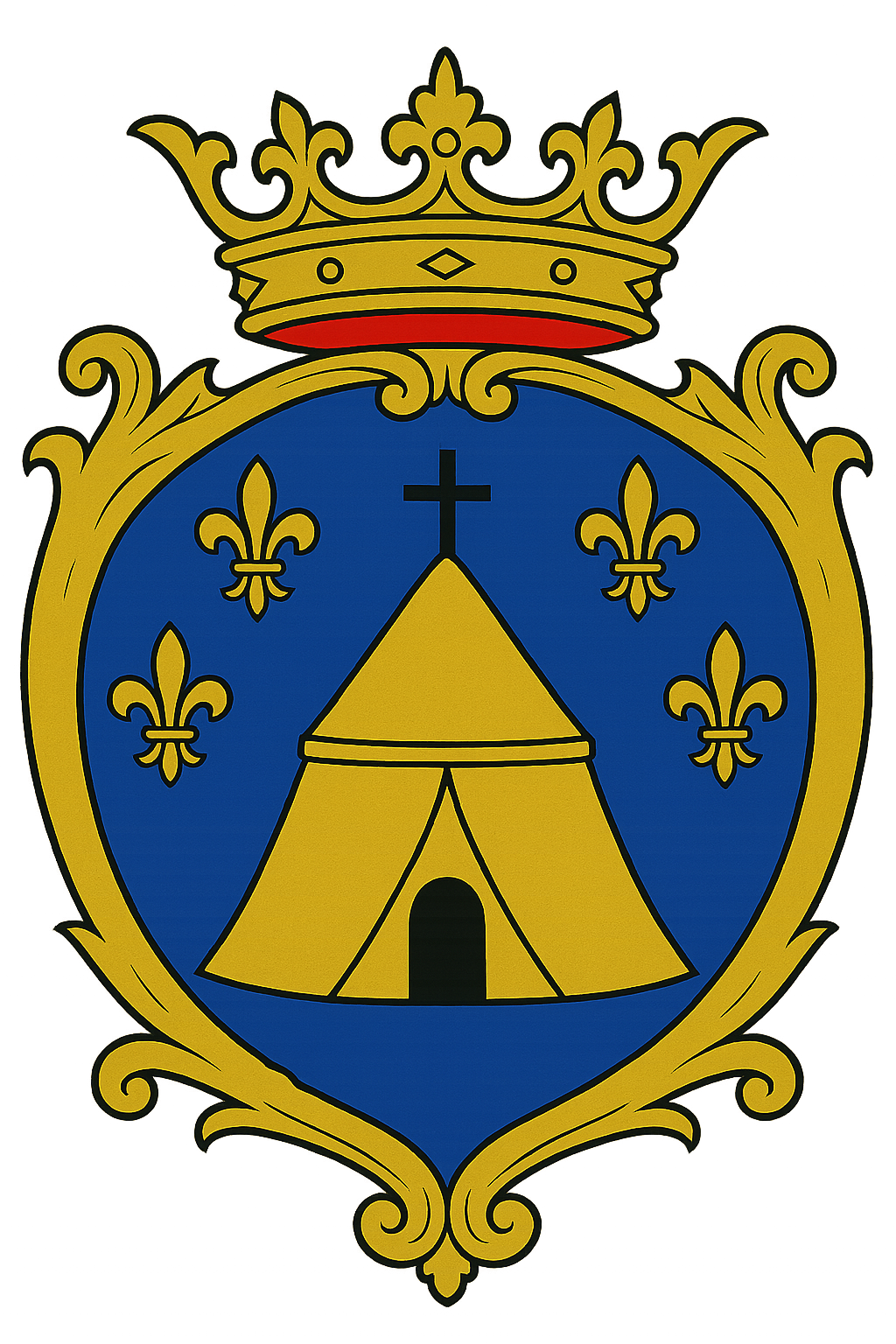
- Coat of arms

- Location within Italy Location within Campania
- Coordinates: 41°11′N 14°27′E
- Country: Italy
- Region: Campania
- Province: Caserta (CE)

Government
  - Mayor: Gennaro Marcuccio

Area
  - Total: 17.5 km^{2} (6.8 sq mi)
- Elevation: 58 m (190 ft)

Population (31 March 2017)
  - Total: 1,546
  - Density: 88.3/km^{2} (229/sq mi)
- Demonym: Castelcampagnanesi
- Time zone: UTC+1 (CET)
  - Summer (DST): UTC+2 (CEST)
- Postal code: 81010
- Dialing code: 0823
- Website: Official website

Castel Campagnano is a comune (municipality) in the Province of Caserta in the Italian region Campania, located about 40 kilometres (25 mi) northeast of Naples and about 15 kilometres (9 mi) northeast of Caserta.

Castel Campagnano borders the municipalities of Caiazzo and Ruviano in the province of Caserta, and Amorosi, Dugenta, Limatola, Melizzano in the province of Benevento.

Castel Campagnano is a small agricultural center located on the right bank of the river Volturno, near Caserta. The surrounding hills are characterised by vineyards, olive trees and dense vegetation. The frazione of Squille is south of the municipal area. Today, Castel Campagnano's economy revolves mostly around agriculture, small industries and tourism.

Castel Campagnano is a member of Cittaslow.

== Main sights ==
- Castle
- Parish of St. Mary of the Snow. The present building was renovated in 1753, and has a single nave.
- Church of Sant'Angelo

== Culture ==
A wine and oil festival is held in two days in June.
