= Apollosa =

- Comune
- Comune di Apollosa
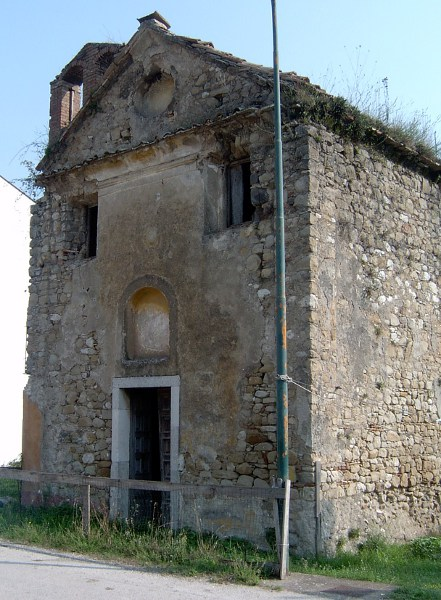
- Church of San Domenico

- Location within Italy Location within Campania
- Coordinates: 41°6′N 14°42′E
- Country: Italy
- Region: Campania
- Province: Benevento (BN)
- Frazioni: San Giovanni

Government
  - Mayor: Marino Corda

Area
  - Total: 21.0 km^{2} (8.1 sq mi)
- Elevation: 430 m (1,410 ft)

Population (1 January 2020)
  - Total: 2,557
  - Density: 122/km^{2} (315/sq mi)
- Demonym: Apollosani
- Time zone: UTC+1 (CET)
  - Summer (DST): UTC+2 (CEST)
- Postal code: 82010
- Dialing code: 0824
- ISTAT code: 062004
- Patron saint: Saint Anne
- Saint day: 26 July
- Website: Official website

Apollosa is a comune (municipality) in the Province of Benevento in the Italian region Campania, located about 50 km (31 mi) northeast of Naples and about 8 km (5.0 mi) southwest of Benevento.

Apollosa borders the following municipalities: Benevento, Campoli del Monte Taburno, Castelpoto, Ceppaloni, Montesarchio, San Leucio del Sannio.
