= Amorosi =

Comune in Campania, Italy

- Comune
- Comune di Amorosi
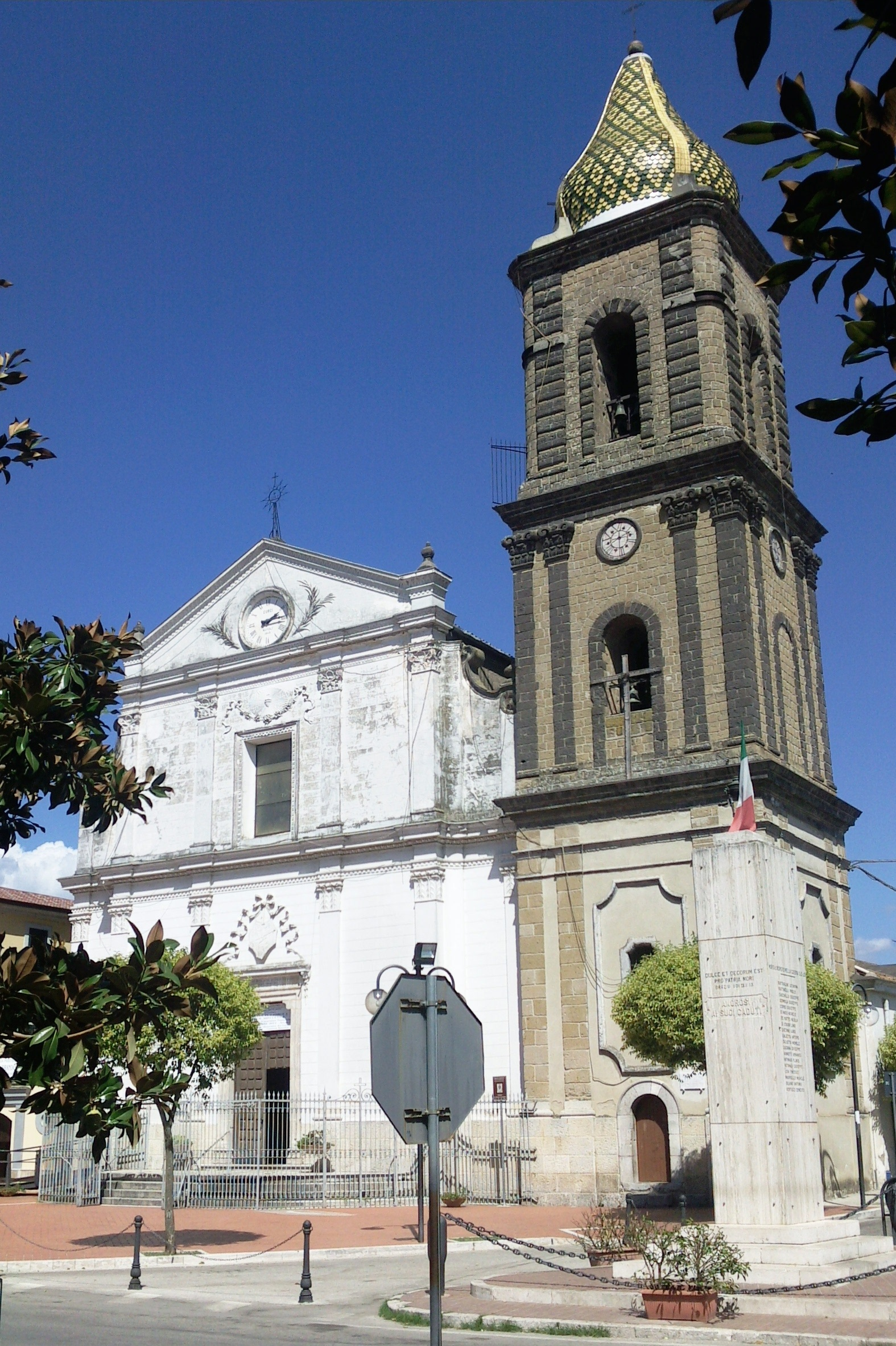
- Church of San Michele Arcangelo

- Location within Italy Location within Campania
- Coordinates: 41°12′N 14°28′E
- Country: Italy
- Region: Campania
- Province: Province of Benevento (BN)

Area
  - Total: 11.0 km^{2} (4.2 sq mi)

Population (1 January 2022)
  - Total: 2,631
  - Density: 239/km^{2} (619/sq mi)
- Demonym: Amorosino
- Time zone: UTC+1 (CET)
  - Summer (DST): UTC+2 (CEST)
- Postal code: 82031
- Dialing code: 0824
- ISTAT code: 062002
- Patron saint: Saint Michael Archangel
- Saint day: 29 September
- Website: www.comune.amorosi.bn.it

Amorosi is a comune (municipality) in the Province of Benevento in the Italian region Campania, located about 45 km (28 mi) northeast of Naples and about 30 km (19 mi) northwest of Benevento. As of 1 January 2020, it had a population of 2,709 and an area of 11.0 km^{2} (4.2 sq mi).

Amorosi borders the following municipalities: Castel Campagnano, Melizzano, Puglianello, Ruviano, San Salvatore Telesino and Telese Terme.

== Archaeology ==
In 2024, an Iron Age necropolis dating back to the 8th-7th centuries BCE was discovered near Amorosi during the construction of an electric station. Artifacts found at the site include a variety of vases, weapons, and bronze ornaments.

== Demographic evolution ==
Historical population

Year	Pop.	±%
1861	1,642	—
1871	1,850	+12.7%
1881	2,103	+13.7%
1901	2,306	+9.7%
1911	2,547	+10.5%
1921	2,565	+0.7%

Year	Pop.	±%
1931	2,675	+4.3%
1936	2,869	+7.3%
1951	3,296	+14.9%
1961	2,970	−9.9%
1971	2,626	−11.6%
1981	2,737	+4.2%

Year	Pop.	±%
1991	2,808	+2.6%
2001	2,761	−1.7%
2011	2,836	+2.7%
2021	2,645	−6.7%
2022	2,631	−0.5%

Source: Data from ISTAT

== See also ==
- Necropolis of Amorosi
