= San Salvatore Telesino =

- Comune
- Comune di San Salvatore Telesino
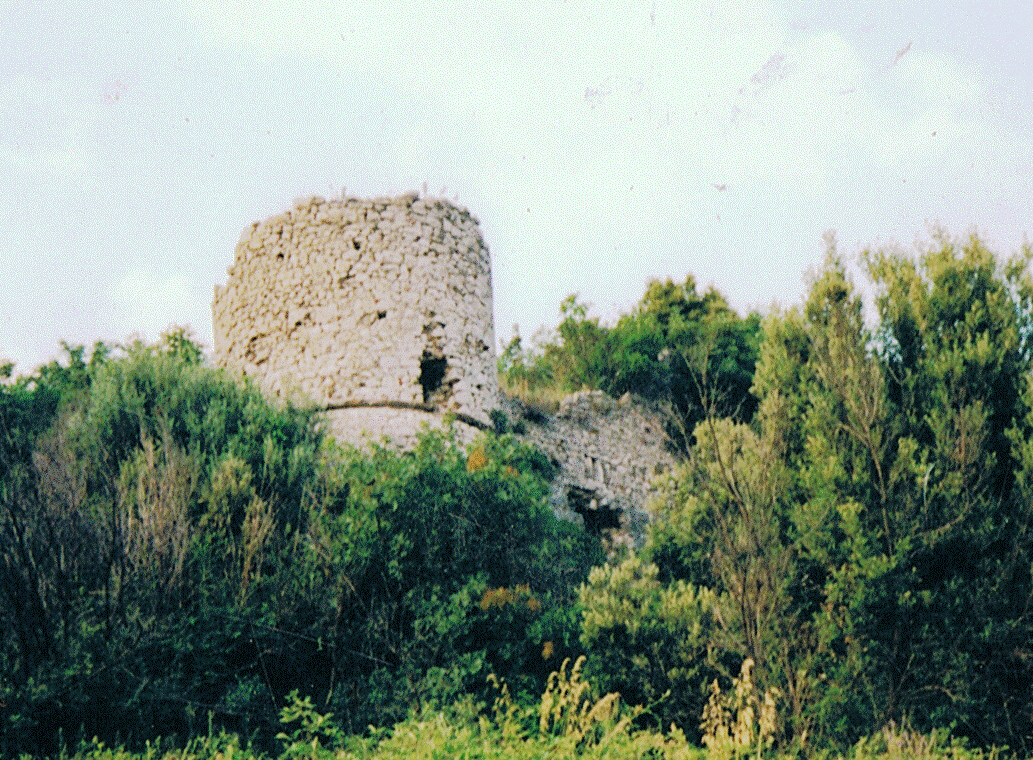
- Remains of the Rocca of San Salvatore.

- Coat of arms

- Location within Italy Location within Campania
- Coordinates: 41°14′N 14°30′E
- Country: Italy
- Region: Campania
- Province: Benevento (BN)
- Frazioni: Casale, Epitaffio, Banca

Government
  - Mayor: Fabio Massimo Leucio Romano

Area
  - Total: 18.1 km^{2} (7.0 sq mi)
- Elevation: 95 m (312 ft)

Population (31 December 2016)
  - Total: 4,024
  - Density: 222/km^{2} (576/sq mi)
- Demonym: Sansalvatoresi
- Time zone: UTC+1 (CET)
  - Summer (DST): UTC+2 (CEST)
- Postal code: 82035
- Dialing code: 0824
- Website: Official website

San Salvatore Telesino (Campanian: U Casàle) is a comune (municipality) in the Province of Benevento in the Italian region Campania, located about 50 kilometres (31 mi) northeast of Naples and about 25 kilometres (16 mi) northwest of Benevento.

San Salvatore Telesino borders the following municipalities: Amorosi, Castelvenere, Faicchio, Puglianello, San Lorenzello, Telese Terme. Sights include the remains of the ancient Telesia and of the former Rocca (castle), as well as the Abbey of San Salvatore.

== History ==
The communal territory includes the remains (walls, amphitheater) of the ancient Telesia, a Samnite city. In the 1st century BC a Roman colony was founded here. This colony, after the Lombard conquest, became the seat of a gastald. The Saracen raids of 847 and a following earthquake led to the abandonment of the city. A group of refugees from Telesia were sheltered by the monks of the Benedictine monastery of San Salvatore and given some terrain to build a new town, which took the name from the saint. The abbey ruled the village until its destruction in 1349 by an earthquake.

Later, the area was donated to Giovanni Monsorio, majordomo of king Ferdinand I of Aragon. The last feaudataries were the Carafa family.

== Main sights ==
=== Benedictine monastery of San Salvatore ===
The Benedictine monastery of San Salvatore was built around the 10th century. The first known abbot was Leopoldo, mentioned in 1075. In 1098, under the abbot Giovanni, the monastery hosted Saint Anselm of Aosta. The church has a naves and two aisles and it was recently restored. A fresco, dated around 1300, shows St. Scholastica and the monastery hosts an archeologic exhibit since 2010.

=== Church of Santa Maria Assunta ===
The church is located in the old town and is home to a picture of the Annunciation of the Virgin. Canvesses in the church include: a Transfiguration by the school of Giordano and a St. Leucius by Sarnelli. Also a mausoleum for the duke of Monsorio can be found.

=== Rocca (The Castle) ===
The remains of an old castle are visible on a nearby hill. The castle was built in the 13th century by the count of Sanframondo, in a strategic position on the Valle Telesina (Telesia Valley).

=== Telesia ===
An archaeological area on the provincial road from Telese Terme to San Salvatore. Remains include the walls, an amphiteathre, an aqueduct and the baths.
