= Casolla =

Casolla is an Italian surname. Notable people with the surname include:

- Francesco Casolla (born 1992), Italian footballer
- Giovanna Casolla (born 1945), Italian opera singer

== See also ==
- Casella (disambiguation)
