= Foglianise =

Foglianise Foglianensi
- Comune
- Comune di Foglianise
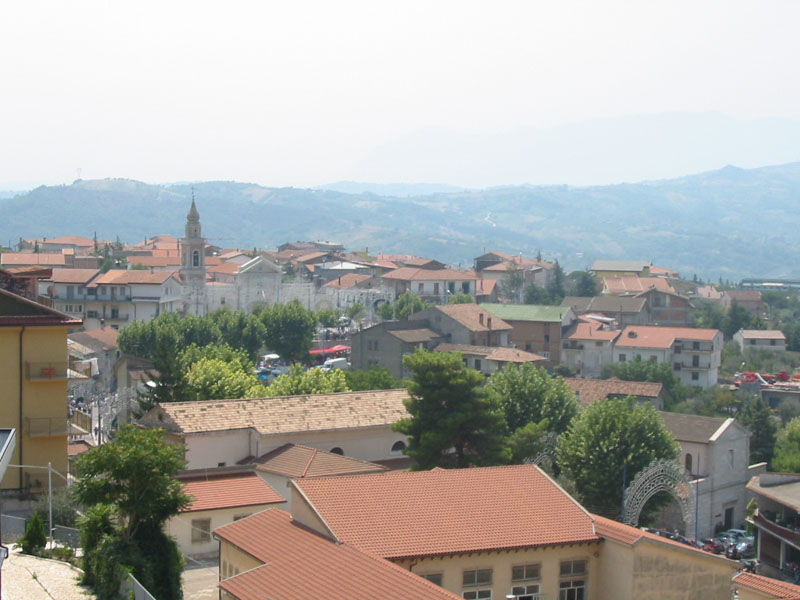

- Location within Italy Location within Campania
- Coordinates: 41°10′N 14°40′E
- Country: Italy
- Region: Campania
- Province: Benevento (BN)
- Frazioni: Cautani, Oliveto, Frascio, Palazzo, Barassano, S.Marco, Leschito, Sirignano, Prato, Ospedale, Dragonetta, Vaccara, Masseria Nuova, Utile, Fossi, Acquara, Mazzella, G.Viglione, Trescine, Palmenta, Badia, Iannilli, Cienzi, Scafa

Government
  - Mayor: Giovanni Mastrocinque (Rinascita Democratica (Democratic Party))

Area
  - Total: 11.77 km^{2} (4.54 sq mi)
- Elevation: 350 m (1,150 ft)

Population (1 January 2020)
  - Total: 3,582
  - Density: 304.3/km^{2} (788.2/sq mi)
- Demonym: Foglianesari
- Time zone: UTC+1 (CET)
  - Summer (DST): UTC+2 (CEST)
- Postal code: 82030
- Dialing code: 0824
- ISTAT code: 062030
- Patron saint: St. Roch; St. Cyriacus
- Saint day: 16 August; 8 August
- Website: Official website

Foglianise (Beneventano: Figlianese or Fuglianese) is a comune (municipality) in the Province of Benevento in the Italian region Campania, located about 50 kilometres (31 mi) northeast of Naples and about 10 kilometres (6.2 mi) northwest of Benevento. Foglianise borders the following municipalities: Benevento, Castelpoto, Cautano, Torrecuso, and Vitulano.

== History ==
Of prehistoric origins, Foglianise is known locally for the Grain Festival that takes place each August.

The discovery of Neolithic pottery and ceramic objects testifies to the antiquity of the human civilisation here, which may date back to the Samnite era. The area is rich in water and pasture, so the economy of that time was probably pastorally based.

A Latin epigraphy believed to date from the 3rd century AD and dedicated to the goddess Fortuna Folianensis, indicates that the name Foglianise was of Roman origin, possibly connected with a substantial land owner named Folius Oriens. There appear to have been significant economic changes in the 3rd and 4th centuries involving changes to the route of the road to Telesia. Roman era relics include the remains of a water storage tank.
