= Church of San Menna =

Church in Sant'Agata de' Goti, Italy

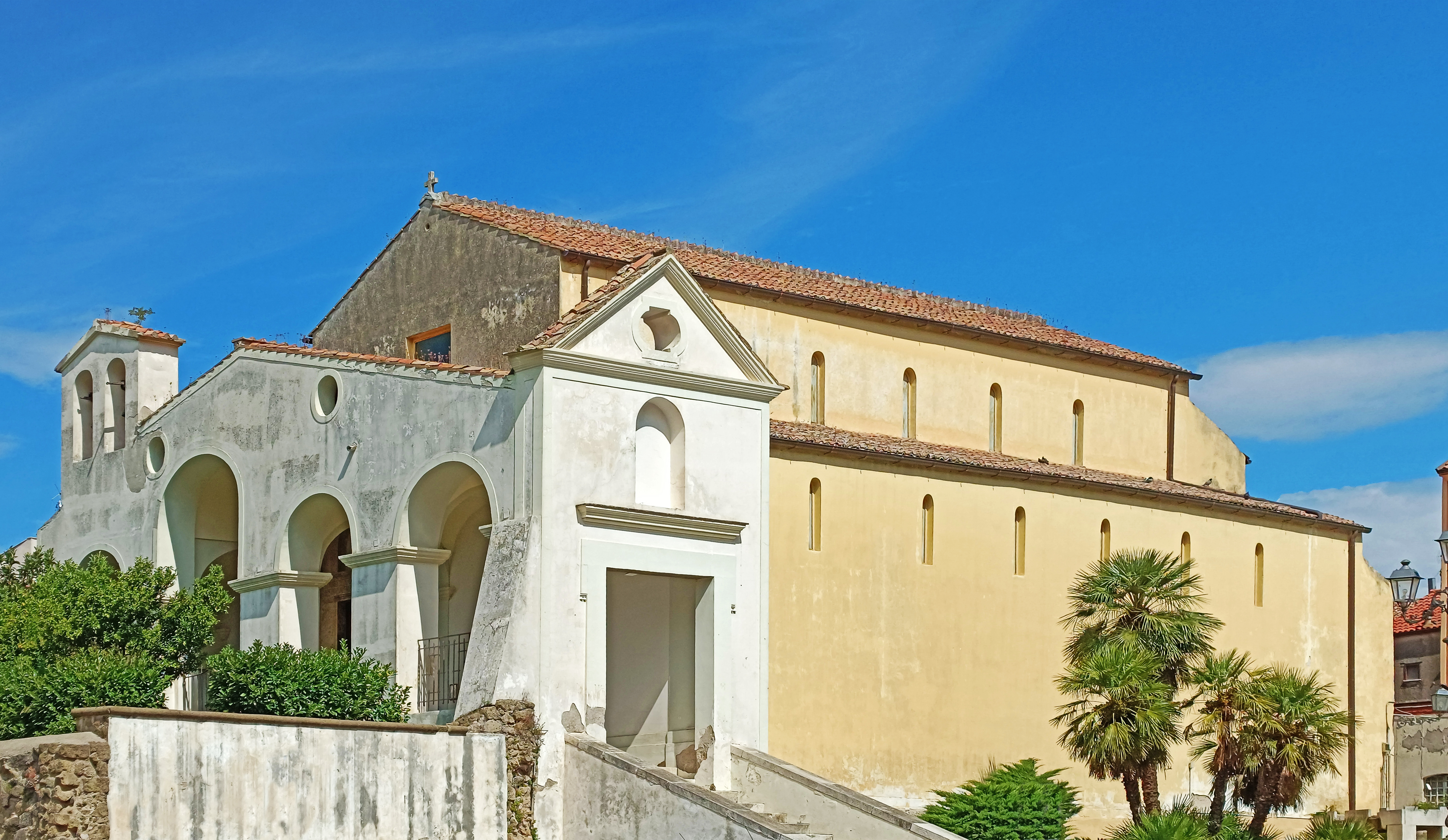
- Exterior

- 41°05′19″N 14°30′13″E
- Location: Sant'Agata de' Goti, Campania, Italy
- Address: Piazza Castello, snc
- Denomination: Catholic

History
- Founder: Robert of Alife
- Dedication: Menna
- Consecrated: September 4, 1100

Architecture
- Style: Romanesque (church); Baroque (atrium)
- Groundbreaking: late 11th century or early 12th century
- Completed: by 1108

The church of San Menna, formerly San Pietro, is a Catholic place of worship in Sant'Agata de' Goti, in the province of Benevento and diocese of Cerreto Sannita-Telese-Sant'Agata de' Goti.

The church, dedicated on Sept. 4, 1100 by Pope Paschal II and built a few years earlier at the behest of Count Robert of Alife, holds within it important testimonies of Romanesque art in southern Italy, such as the oldest presbyteral structure with most of the original elements still in place, as well as the oldest opus sectile floor, both modeled after the Desiderian basilica of Montecassino.

== History ==
Menna, a hermit on the Taburno Camposauro near Vitulano, already had a reputation for holiness during his lifetime and died around 538/584. In 1094, wishing to give greater luster to the Caiazzo Cathedral, Count Robert of Alife had the saint's remains transferred there; however, due to disagreements with the bishop of Caiazzo Constantine and the insistence of the metropolitan archbishop of Benevento Roffredo, on April 11 of a year between 1102 and 1007 (presumably 1103 or 1006) the relics were transferred to Sant'Agata de' Goti. There they were received in the pre-existing church of St. Peter, located at the southern end of the town, immediately inside the town wall, which was attached to a Benedictine men's monastery and served as a comital chapel. The mortal remains of St. Menna in Sant'Agata de' Goti became a pilgrimage destination, and the saint was attributed multiple miraculous healings.

The aforementioned church of St. Peter is to be identified with the present church of St. Menna. It was built at the behest of Robert of Alife between the end of the 11th century and the beginning of the next, and had presumably been completed in 1108, the year of the oldest document that makes express mention of it as “ecclesiæ beati Petri apostuli site infra munitionem nostri castelli civitatis Sanctæ Agathes.” The pre-existence of the building would also be supported by the presence within it of the relics of Saints Brizio and Socio, which therefore would have been venerated there even before the arrival of those of the hermit saint. The church was dedicated on September 4, 1100, by Pope Paschal II, who was in Samnium to strengthen relations with the Norman counties; it was dedicated to Jesus the Savior, the Virgin Mary, the True Cross and Saints Peter, Paul and Menna, as recorded in the dedicatory epigraph still visible in the building:

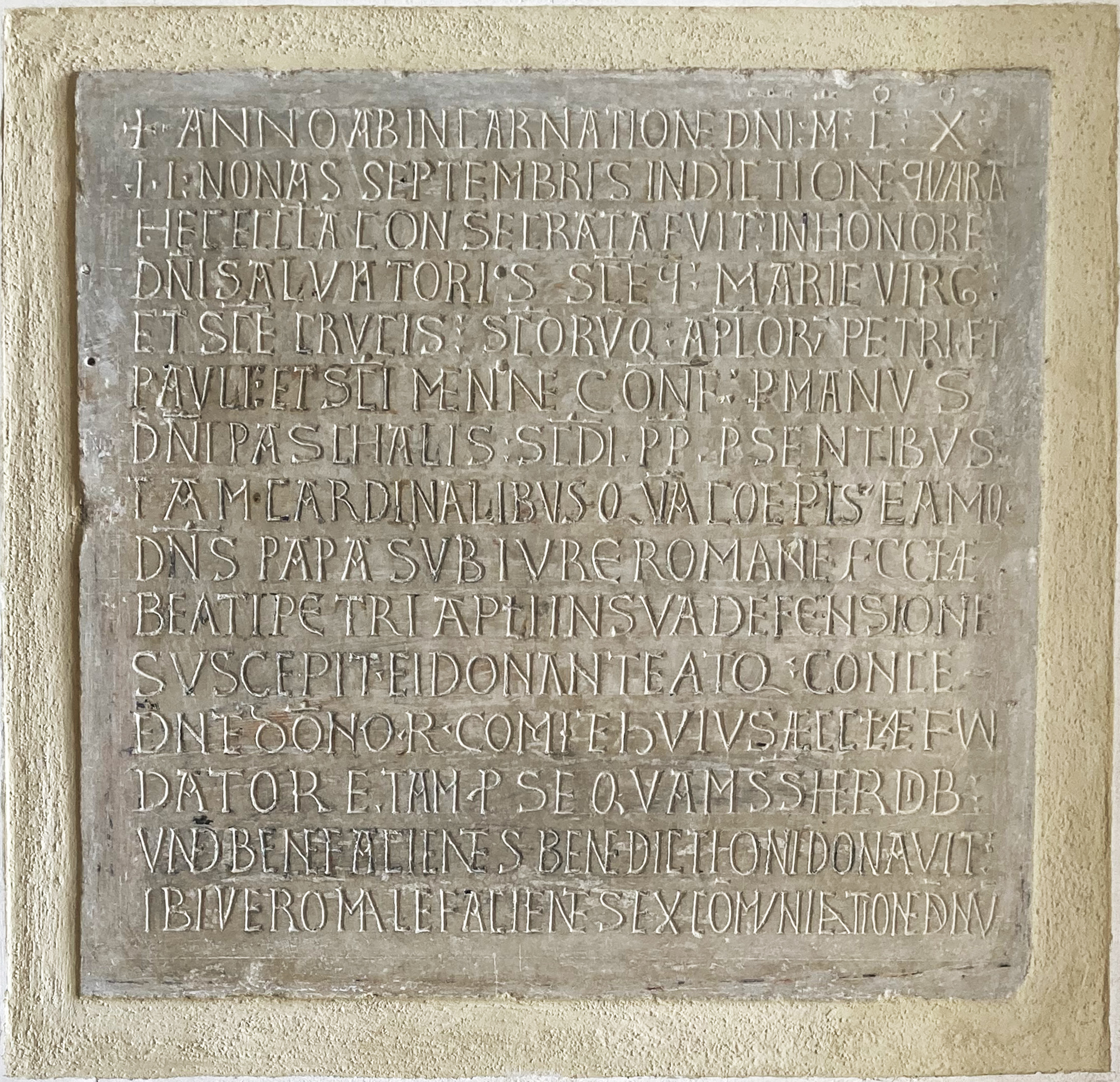
Dedicatory epigraph

† ANNO AB INCARNATIONE D(omi)NI M C° X° / II NONAS SEMPTEMBRIS INDICTIONE QUARTA / HEC ECCL(esi)A CONSECRATA FUIT IN HONORE<m> / D(omi)NI SALVATORIS S(anc)TEQ(ue) MARIE VIRG(inis) / ET S(an)C(t)E CRUCIS S(an)C(t)ORU(m)Q(ue) AP(osto)LORU(m) PETRI ET / PAULI ET S(an)C(t)I MENNE CONF(essoris) P(er) MANUS / D(omi)NI PASCHALIS S(e)C(un)DI P(a)P(e) P(rae)SENTIBUS / TAM CARDINALIBUS QUA(m) COEPIS EAMQ(ue) D(omi)N(u)S PAPA SUB IURE ROMANE ECCL(esi)AE / BEATI PETRI AP(osto)LI IN SUA DEFENSIONE / SUSCEPIT EI DONANTE ATQ(ue) CONCE / D(e)NTE DO(mi)NO R(oberto) COMITE HUIUS AECCL(esi)AE FUN / DATORE TAM P(ro) SEQUAM S(ui) Her<e>DIB(us) / UND(e) BENEFICIENTES BENEDICTIONI DONAVIT / IBI VERO MALEFICIENTES EXCOMMUNICATIONE DAMNAV(it)
"In the year 1100 from the Incarnation of the Lord, on the second day of the ninth of September, in the fourth indiction, this church was consecrated in honor of the Lord Savior, the Holy Virgin Mary, the Holy Cross, the Holy Apostles Peter and Paul and St. Menna the Confessor, by the hand of the Lord Pope Paschal II in the presence of both cardinals and bishops. The Lord Pope took it under the authority of the Roman Church of the Blessed Apostle Peter to defend it, which the Lord Count Robert, founder of this Church both for himself and for his heirs, had given and granted to him; from which he bestowed blessings on the benefactors, while condemning to excommunication the malefactors (who) would go there."

—Plaque commemorating the dedication of the church.

Between the 12th and mid-15th centuries the interior of the church was enriched with wall paintings on several occasions, so much so that it was described during the pastoral visitation of 1702 as “everywhere adorned with ancient paintings.”

In the minutes of pastoral visits in the first half of the 16th century, the church and abbey are indicated as no longer being entrusted to the order of St. Benedict, but to the Augustinians. They remained there until the suppression of the congregation in 1575 at the behest of Pope Gregory XIII, following which Pompeo Bozzuto was appointed commendatory abbot, on whose death (1584) the church with its annuities was entrusted to the Scottish Jesuit college in Rome, to which it remained subject until 1773; in 1590 San Menna became curacy of the parish of Sant'Angelo de Munculanis. In 1674 the altar of the church was desecrated by a certain Giacinto Cacciapuoti, who had rented the premises of the former abbey, who violated it in the hope of finding precious objects inside. For the greater safety of the relics that were instead kept there, they were moved to the cathedral; in 1701, at the request of the chapter, the bishop of Sant'Agata de' Goti Filippo Albini subjected them to a canonical survey.

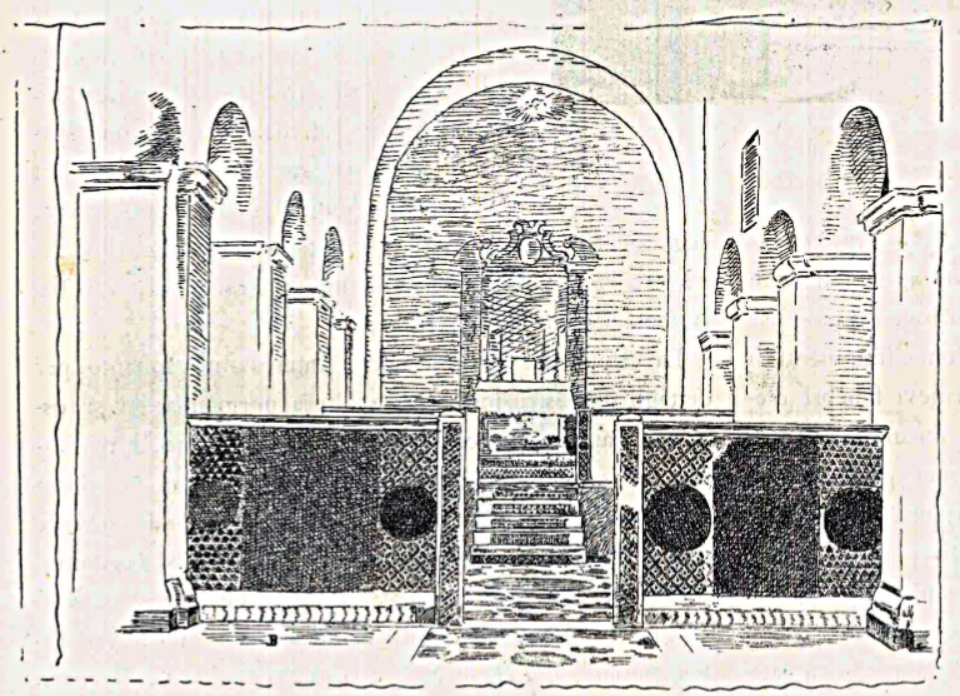
The interior of the church following eighteenth-century alterations, in an 1896 drawing by Émile Bertaux.

During the 18th century the church underwent some major alterations since, as evidenced by the record of the pastoral visit of 1702, it was in very poor condition. To reinforce the structure, in 1779 or 1789, the columns dividing the naves were incorporated within masonry pillars on which new arches, less wide than the medieval ones, were set; presumably in the same circumstance, the atrium and the outer rectilinear termination of the apses were built, and the frescoes were plastered white; in the Baroque period, moreover, the altar was provided with a stucco altarpiece. In 1846-1847 Abbot Filippo Ventapane unearthed the ancient wall paintings, which, however, upon his death (1892) were covered over again at the behest of the royal bursar's office.

In 1921 at the behest of Domenico Mustilli a masonry excavation was carried out in one of the pillars, which brought to light the column underneath. Between 1955 and 1957 major restoration work was carried out under the direction of Riccardo Pacini and Antonio Rusconi, as part of which all Baroque additions were removed. The 1980 Irpinia earthquake caused the roof of the left aisle to collapse, necessitating a restoration carried out in 1990-1992 and directed by Flavia Belardelli. In 2010, on the occasion of the ninth centenary since the dedication of the church, the relics of Saints Menna, Brizio and Socio, which were already kept under the altar of the church, were brought back there; on that occasion, Cardinal Secretary of State of the Holy See Tarcisio Bertone presided over a Eucharistic celebration on September 12. The following year a canonical survey was conducted on the relics, which, using the carbon-14 method, established the authenticity of the relics of St. Menna, while it ruled out the belonging of those of St. Brice to the bishop of Tours of the same name, who died in 444, since they were traced back to the period of the founding of the Santagatese church.

== Description ==
=== Architecture ===
Plan

The church of San Menna is located at the southern edge of the ancient town of Sant'Agata de' Goti, on a small hillock close to the Lombard town wall, opposite the comital castle and near the main gateway to the town. Its orientation along the north-south axis (with the apses to the north) rather than the usual east-west is attributable to the presence of pre-existing buildings.

The church is Romanesque in style, with a three-nave plan separated by arcades on columns, covered with wooden trusses and each ending in a semicircular apse. The early Christian basilica structure, despite the absence of the transept present in the prototype, is reminiscent of that of the Desiderian basilica of Montecassino (1066-1071), with a layout similar to that of several coeval buildings, such as the basilica of Sant'Angelo in Formis near Capua (1072-1087), the church of Santa Lucia in Gaeta (late 11th century) and the church of Santa Maria in Foro Claudio in Ventaroli (before 1087). In addition, San Menna would be the result of the readjustment of the architectural modules of the cathedral of Santa Maria Assunta in Sant'Agata de' Goti in its primitive layout in the last years of the 11th century, which, however, was Latin cross-shaped even then.

Despite the considerable elevation of the presbyteral area, the church of San Menna lacks a crypt; however, below the apses there are still some rooms intended for secular use, which can be accessed from outside the building, from the rear elevation.

Below are the main measurements of the church, with reference to the interior of the building:

| Parameter | Measurement |
|---|---|
| Length | 22,48 m |
| Width | 13,04 m |
| Length of nave | 6,46 m |
| Length of the aisles | 2,65 m |
| Surface area of the opus sectile floor | 260 m² approx. |

=== Exterior ===
Externally, the building has integrally plastered light-colored walls, with pitched roofs with brick tiles.

==== Facades ====
The main facade with the remains of the ancient circle of walls in front of it

The main facade, facing south, is salient and traces the building's internal layout. Leaning against it is the Baroque atrium, from the late 18th century, which is preceded by a coeval garden carved out of the space between the church and the wall in front, of which some remains are still visible in that section. Access to the pronaos, therefore, takes place laterally; while the western entrance (toward the area of the ancient monastery) is devoid of decorative elements, the eastern one (toward Piazza Castello) is characterized by a monumental staircase leading to a portal with stucco molding and cornice, surmounted by an arched niche and inserted in a façade that ends, at the top, with a triangular tympanum in which an oculus opens. The atrium opens toward the south with four asymmetrical arches on quadrangular pillars, of which the second from the left, located at the doorway to the interior of the church, is wider than the others; of the four bays into which the room is divided, only the main one is barrel-vaulted, while the remaining three are cross-vaulted. Above the first left arch of the atrium rises a two-arched bell gable tower, presumably dating from the 1955-1957 restorations; it replaces the old bell tower located on the left apsidiole, which was mutilated in the 20th century. A rectangular window opens in the upper part of the façade wall, at the nave.

The rear elevation of the church, on Viale Vittorio Emanuele III, consists of the wall that incorporates the three apses, dating from the late 18th century, an architectural feature that is absent everywhere in Campania's Romanesque context. The prominence of this wall with respect to the termination of the aisles is emphasized by the single-pitched roof sloping toward the north. A splayed and rounded monofora opens at each internal apse.

==== Portal ====
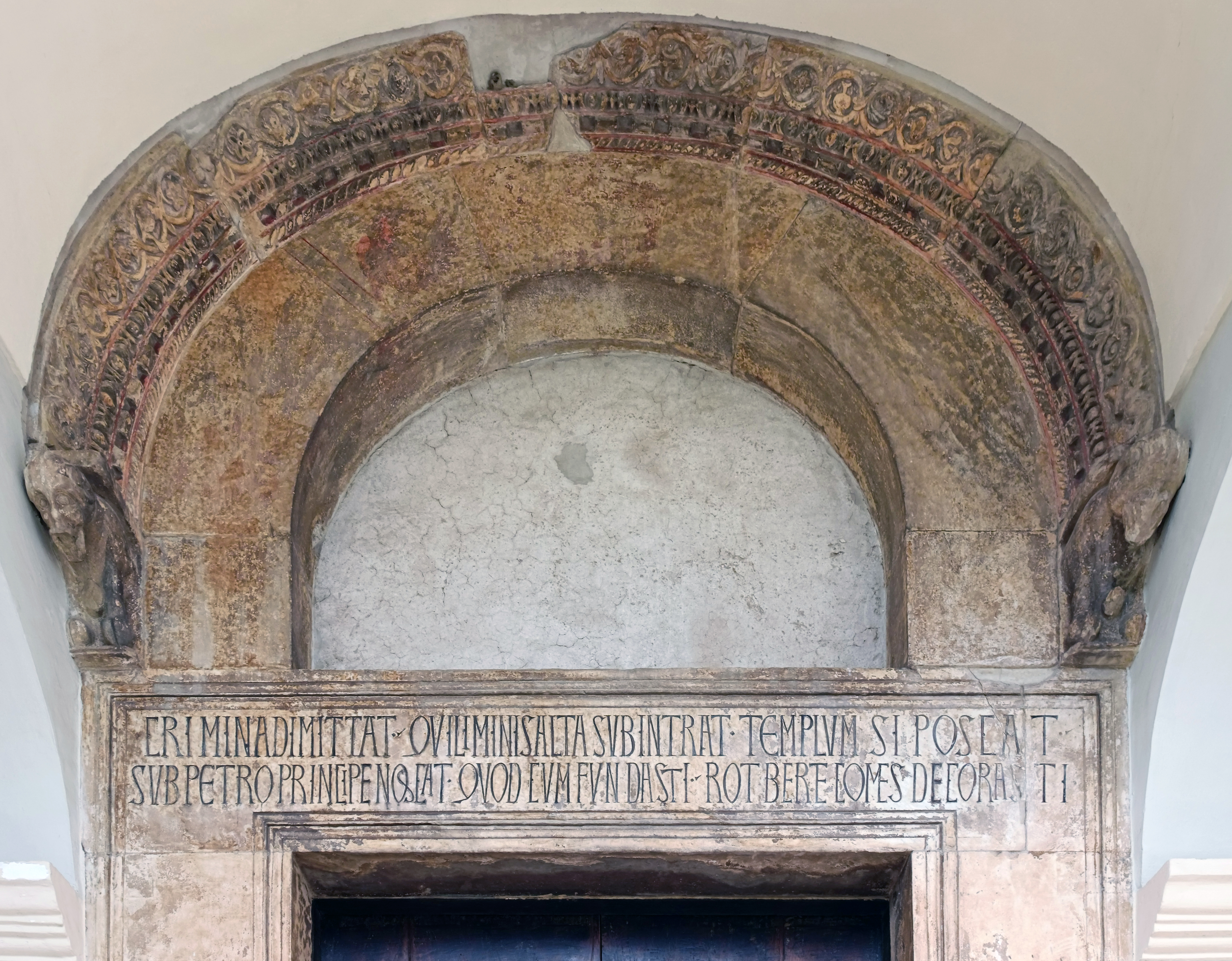
The lunette and architrave of the portal

Originally, the church had two entrances, of which the minor one, from the cloister, is found in the excavation in the outer wall of the left aisle, at the fifth arch. At present, the only portal is placed in the façade, along the longitudinal axis of the church. Its notable prominence from the counter-facade wall is attributable to its insertion, originally, within a forepart to which the Baroque atrium would later, in the 18th century, be attached, which replaced a prothyrum on columns, perhaps not dissimilar in its general configuration from that of the side portal of the former church of Santa Lucia in Gaeta. The portal, which in its present state is the result of reworkings, has a structure similar to those of the cathedral of Sant'Agata de' Goti, the former cathedral of Saints Bernard and Martin in Carinola and the basilica of Sant'Angelo in Formis near Capua. The opening, rectangular, is framed by a molding that, on the architrave, bears the following inscription:

CRIMINA DIMITTAT QUI LIMINIS ALTA SUBINTRAT TEMPLUM SI POSCAT / SUB PETRO PRINCIPE NOSCAT QUOD CUM FUNDASTI ROTBERTE COMES DECORASTI
Let him who crosses the steps of the threshold forsake his sins. If (anyone) asks, let him know that the temple is placed under Peter, Prince (of the Apostles), and that you, Count Robert, having founded it, have adorned it worthily.

—Inscription on the architrave of the portal.

This text, in Romanesque capitals, was formulated both as a call to conversion, as a reminder of the apostle Peter, the ancient titular of the building, and with it the universality of the Church, as well as a celebration of the building's founder, Count Robert of Alife. Above the architrave is the raised-arch lunette, around which is a semicircular projecting cornice resting on two elephant-shaped corbels, which are badly damaged. The archivolt is divided into five bands ornamented with bas-reliefs: the outermost one, which is wider than the others, is ornamented with a double wavy shoot with fruits and plant elements, projecting from the gaping jaws two sea serpents, placed at the ends; the next one with an oval and beaded motif; the third with a dice motif; and the fifth with a spiral relief.

=== Interior ===
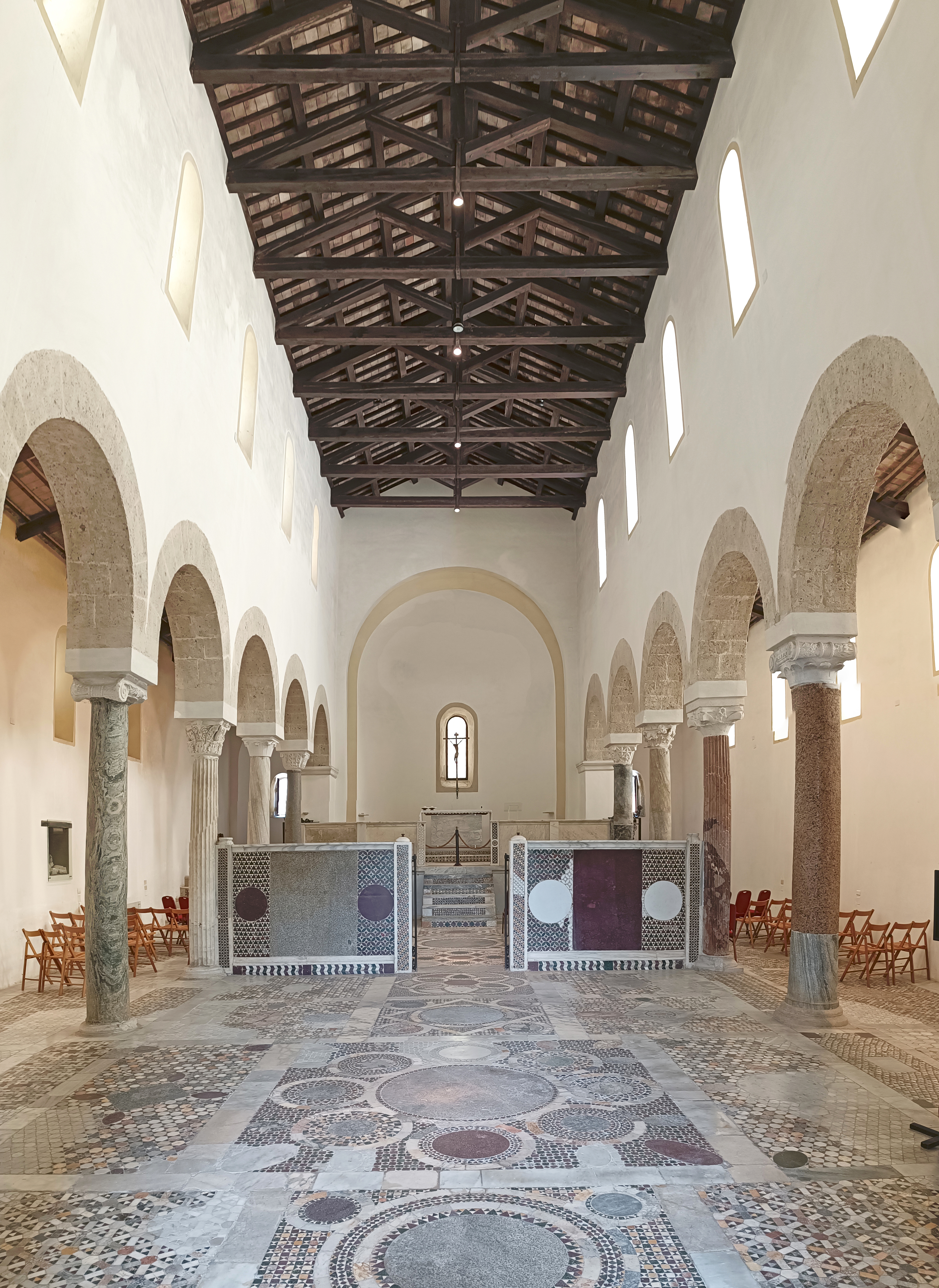
Interior

Internally, the three naves are separated by two rows of six semicircular arches each, which rest on ten reclaimed columns in different varieties of marble, and at the end on quadrangular half-pillars with simple stucco cornices. Of the columns, only four have ancient capitals: these are the two Ionic ones of the first two on the left, and the Corinthian ones of the third on the left and the fourth on the right. The first two capitals on the right are composite, specially made to compensate for the reduced height of the underlying shafts and to harmonize with the Ionic artifacts in front; the third capital on the right and the fourth on the left, on the other hand, are the result of a medieval reinterpretation of the Corinthian order. Finally, the column in each row closest to the apse features the reuse of a capital with geometrically interwoven decoration datable to the mid-11th century. The columns were composed in such a way as to allow the springing line of the arches to rise progressively in the direction of the chancel, according to a scenographic rather than structural purpose.

The aisles are lit by narrow arched monoforas that open six in the minor aisles, and five on each side in the major one. A monofora also opens in the center of each of the three apses. The walls are plastered white except for the arches between the aisles, which are left with exposed stonework. Halfway down the left aisle is a small quadrangular niche in which various stone artifacts found in the garden in front of the church atrium, including floor tiles and epigraphic fragments, have been placed.

==== Schola cantorum and presbytery ====
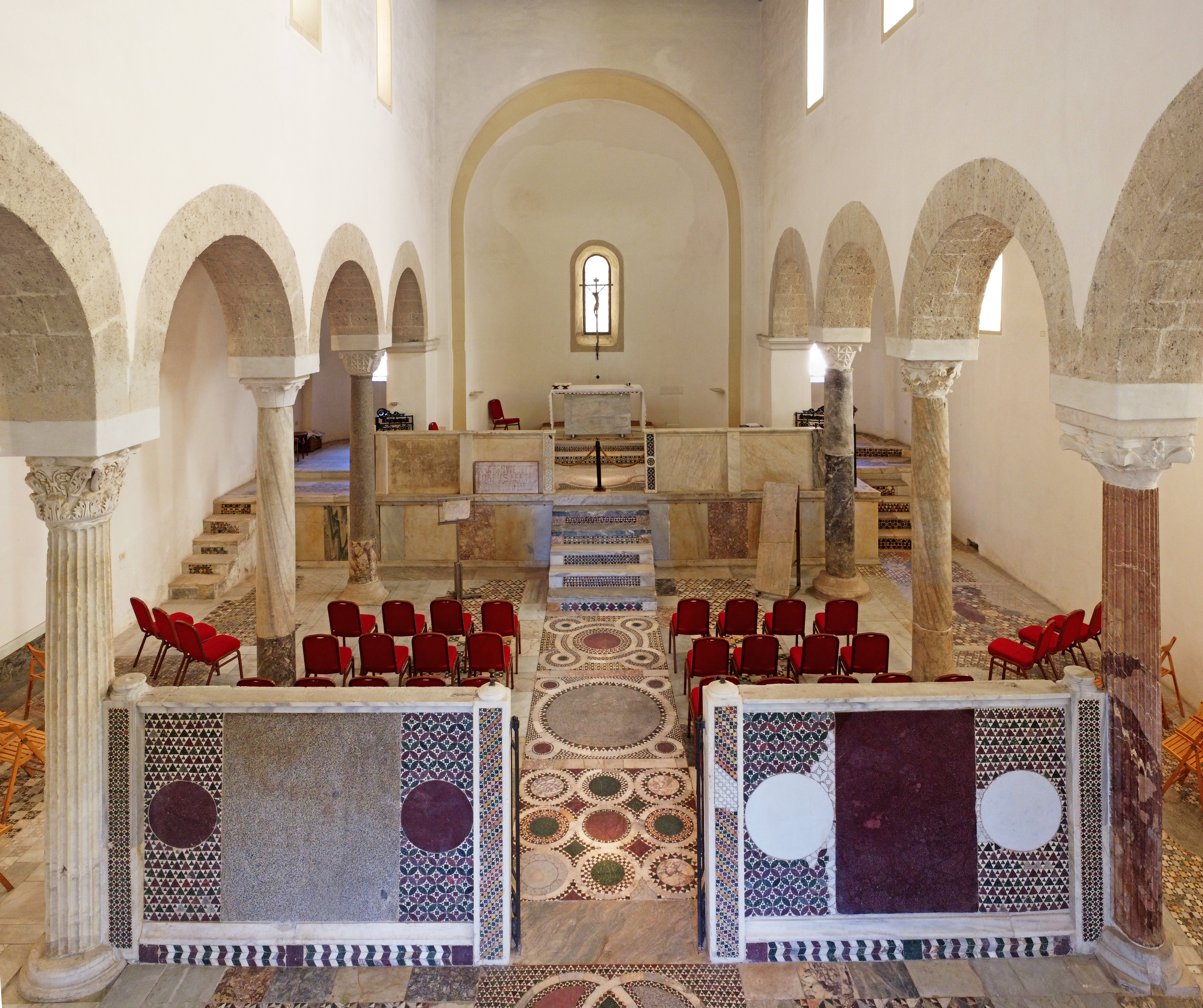
Schola cantorum, presbytery and apse

At the end of the nave, corresponding to the last two arches of each colonnade before the chancel, was originally the schola cantorum, which was dismantled during work in the late 18th century. Of the original enclosure, which enclosed the area on all three sides as in the Desiderian basilica of Monte Cassino, only the two front plutei remain in situ. The two surviving elements are made of masonry and present frontally a polychrome marble facing, symmetrical, consisting of a single rectangular central slab (in red porphyry on the right and in gray granite on the left) flanked by two lateral backgrounds, also rectangular but narrower, with geometric inlays that echo those of the church floor, in the center of which are two disks (in red porphyry, original, on the left and in white marble, the result of reconstruction, on the right). At the ends of each slab, there are small pillars also decorated with marble inlay, and surmounted by circular bases (perhaps of small columns or other decorative elements), similar to those of the thirteenth-century plutei of Roman origin in the former church of Santa Lucia in Gaeta, now partially reassembled in the cathedral of Saints Erasmus and Marcianus and Santa Maria Assunta. The base is ornamented with a trichrome zigzag motif interspersed with porphyry squares. The co-presence of marble slabs and mosaic elements, absent in the Cassinese prototype, was also found in the enclosure of the schola cantorum of Salerno Cathedral prior to the 1121-1136 reconstruction. There are no traces of the lost medieval monumental ambon, the presence of which is attested in the minutes of the pastoral visitation of 1538, which situates it inside the schola cantorum, on the left side.

The presbytery area, elevated above the rest of the church, entirely occupies the three apses with which the aisles end, and the terminal part of the hall corresponding to the last arch of each colonnade. The front boundary of the chancel is not rectilinear, but at the right apsidiole it is shifted backward. Of the two side apses, since the western one was in the later period repurposed as a sacristy, it is the eastern one that presents a floor layout as close as possible to the original one, with the exception of the connection with the main chancel, which was initially absent in both. The area is frontally screened by plutei consisting of marble slabs interspersed with pillars, of which only the two placed on either side of the central entrance are adorned with polychrome inlays (mostly lost in the one on the left); the wall below, which bridges the difference in level between the nave and chancel, is also covered with marble. The presbytery area is accessed via three small masonry staircases: the central one has five steps, while the two lateral ones have four steps each; the elevation, as well as the sides of the middle staircase, are ornamented with polychrome pavement motifs.

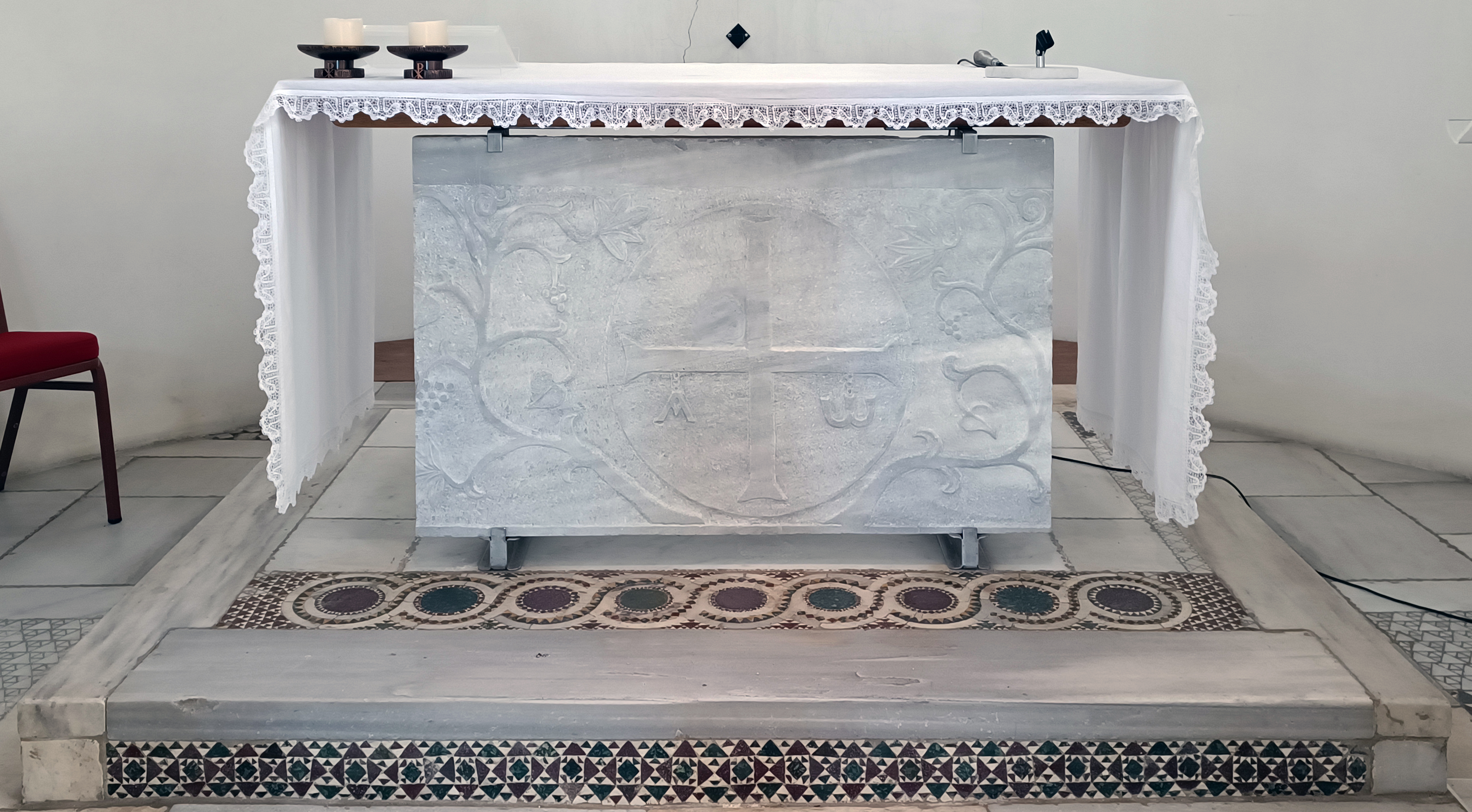
Altar

Inside the central apse the chancel is further elevated. In the center of the room is located the altar, currently the only one present inside the church. It consists of a provisional structure built following the dismemberment in the first half of the 1960s of the ancient medieval casket altar, which had remained intact over the centuries and whose remains are currently displayed in the second bay of the left aisle. Today's altar consists of a metal structure that holds the mensa, made of wood, connecting it to a slab of Proconnesian marble that serves as an antependium. The latter can be dated between the 8th and 10th centuries and features a bas-relief, off-center due to the tampering it has undergone, depicting a large Greek cross from whose side arms hang the letters alpha and omega; it is inscribed within a circle flanked by two vine shoots, with leaves. From the interior of the demolished altar comes a modestly sized opisthographic slab, currently on display in the hall, pertaining to the presence within it of the relics of Saints Menna, Brizio and Socio, which until their desecration in 1674 were placed within a child sarcophagus from the Roman era, in two separate housings identified by the two inscriptions:

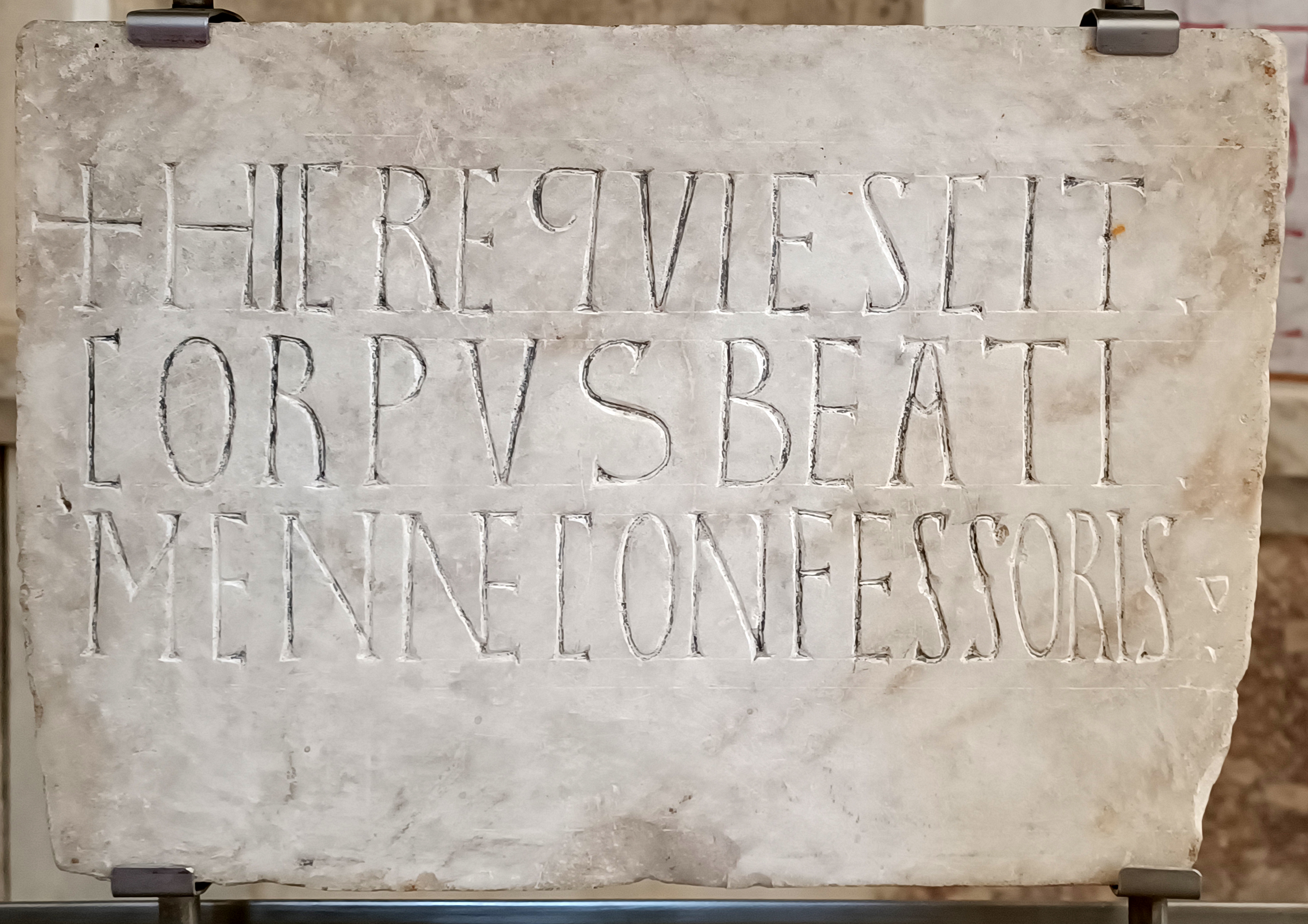
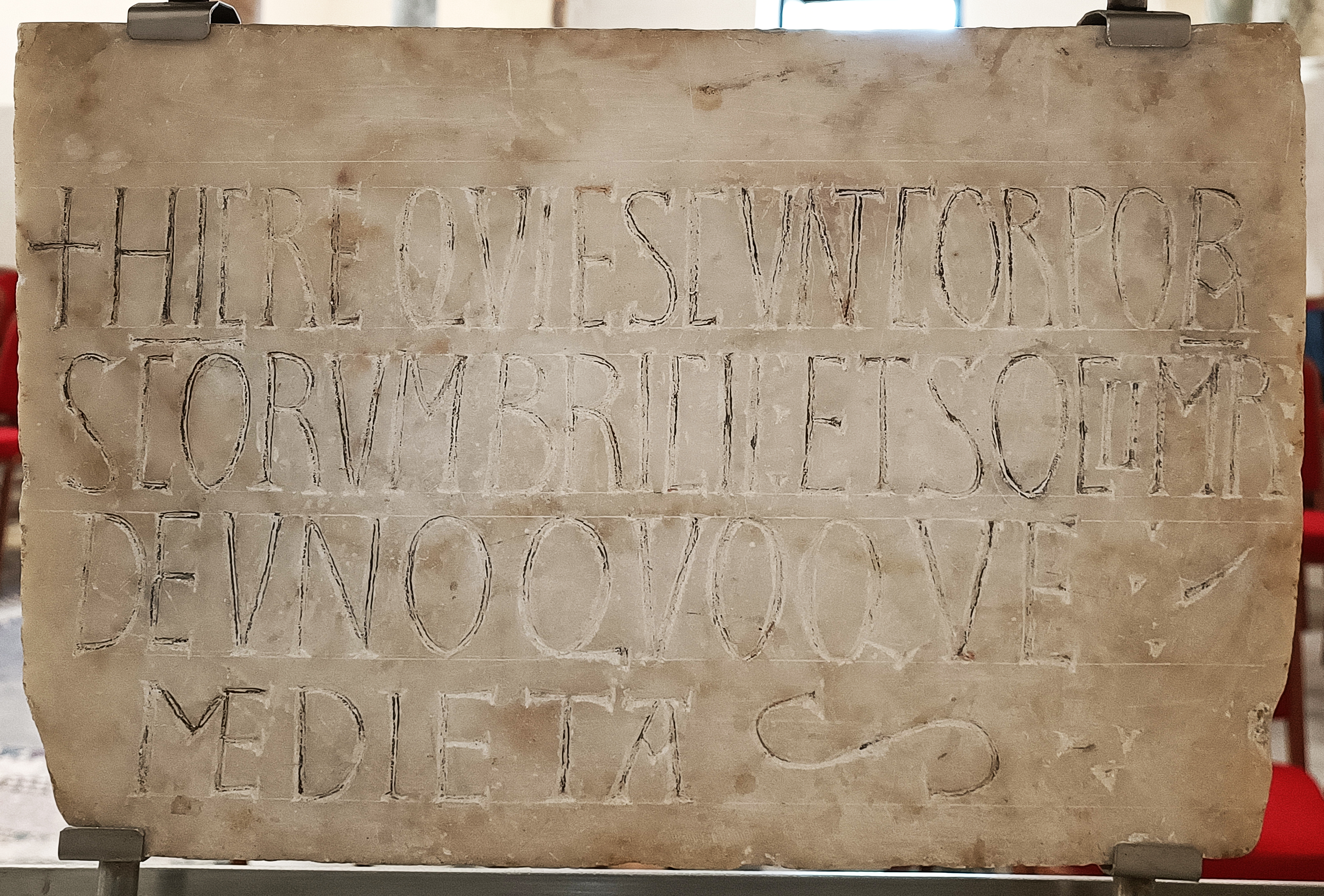
Opisthographic slab
HIC REQUIESCIT / CORPUS BEATI / MENNE CONFESSORIS
Here rests the body of Blessed Menna the confessor.

—Inscription pertaining to Saint Menna.

HIC REQUIESCUNT CORPORA / S(an)C(t)ORUM BRICII ET SOCII M(a)R(tirum) / DE UNOQUOQUE / MEDIETAS
Here rest the bodies of the martyred saints Brizio and Socio, each in its own half (of the urn).

—Inscription pertaining to Saints Brizio and Socio

Below the penultimate arch on the right, in an area close to that of the original burial, is displayed the tomb slab of Abbot Antonio De Tramonto, originally from Benevento, who died in 1316, engraved with the figure of the deceased and his coat of arms, along the edge of which is the following inscription:

HIC IACET VENERABILE IUVENIS QONDA(m) ABBAS ANTONIUS DE TRAMONTO CANONICUS BENEVENTANUS QUI OBIIT AN(n)O D(omi)NI MCCCLXI DIE XIII ME(n)SIS FEBRUARII XIIII I(n)DICCIO(n)IS CUI(us) A(n)I(m)A REQ(ui)ESCA(t) I(n) PACE
Here rests the venerable young man, once abbot Antonio De Tramonto, canon of Benevento, who died in the year of our Lord 1361, on February 13, the fourteenth indiction, whose soul may rest in peace.

—Inscription pertaining to Saint Menna.

==== Floor ====
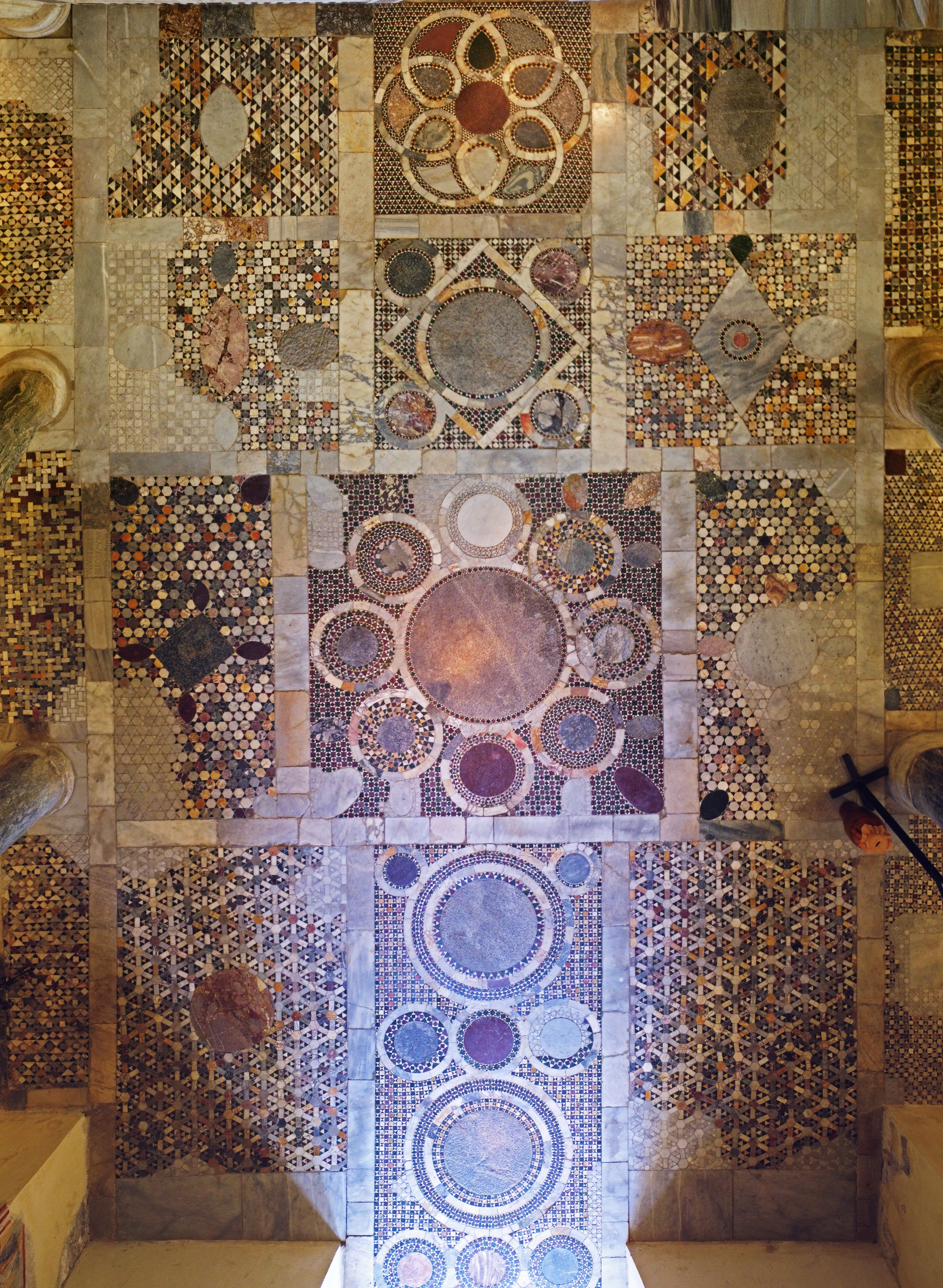
Floor of the nave

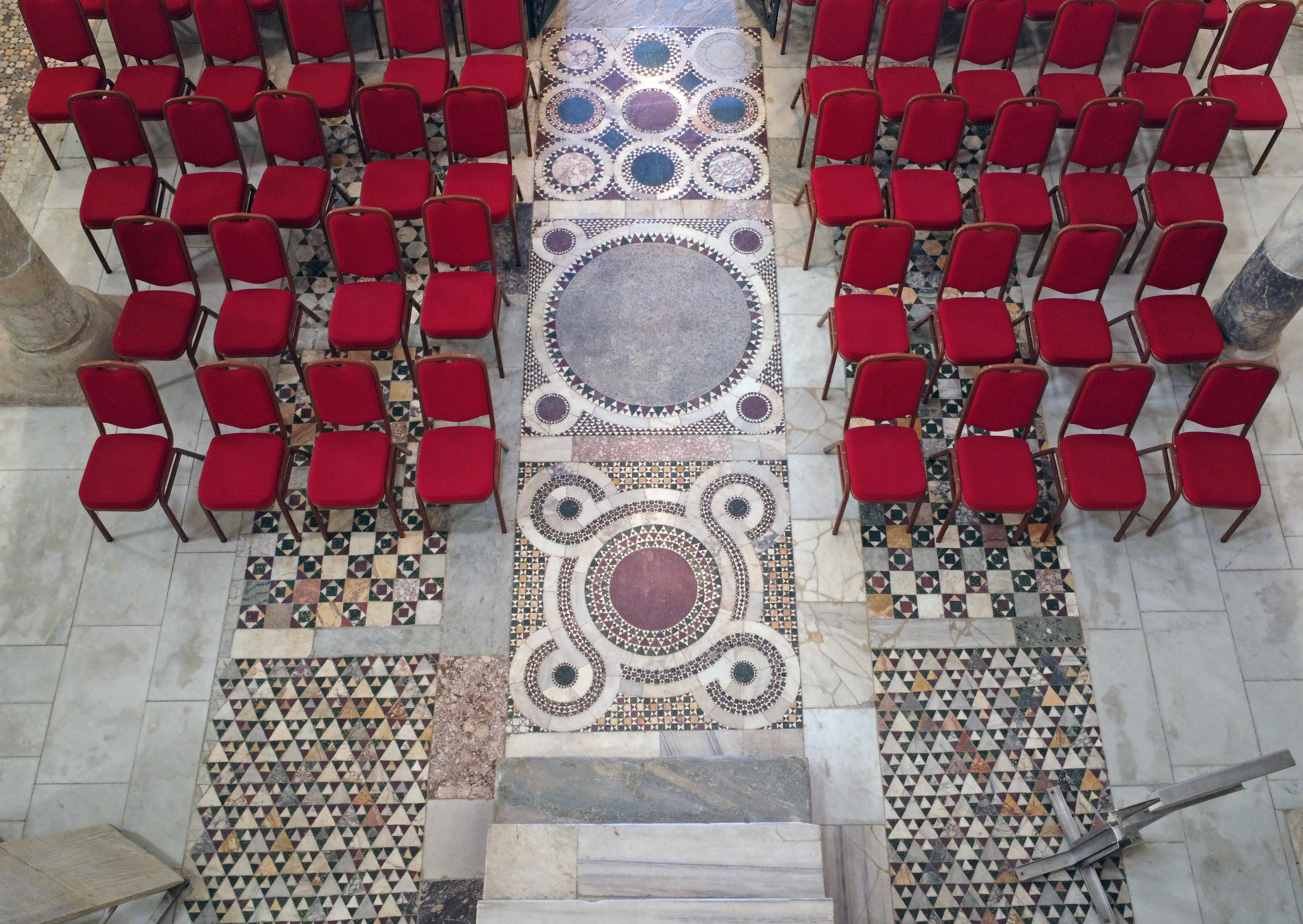
Floor of the schola cantorum (seen from the chancel side)

The interior floor of the entire church is characterized by a polychrome opus sectile mosaic pavement, contemporary with the building and largely unaltered, especially in the nave (the missing areas were restored as part of the restorations of the last quarter of the 20th century by means of white marble elements engraved with patterns similar to the respective lost ones). The floor is strongly inspired by the lost one of the Desiderian basilica of Montecassino, of which it is the most similar example; the link with the Cassinese mosaic pavement and that of Sant'Agata is as much in the arrangement of the panels as in the individual ornamental motifs as well as in the wide variety of elements present in the central band, which allows the work to be attributed to workers linked to the Benedictine abbey. Forty-four different marble types are recorded, with frequent use of ancient red porphyry and a very extensive use of salvaged materials, among which some epigraphic fragments stand out.

The mosaic pavement of the hall is developed in rectangular fields on either side of a central band, which follows the longitudinal axis of the church and is divided into two sections, of which the first corresponds to the space of the nave reserved for the faithful and the second to the area of the schola cantorum. The first panel has three granite rotæ interspersed with two sets of three smaller disks each, with four more disks in the corners. This is followed by a large square field in which is inscribed a large rota surrounded by eight smaller ones; this interlacing is connected to the outer frame by ovals, which are also present at the four corners. The first of the next two panels has a square, rotated 45 degrees, inscribing a rota and surrounded by four smaller discs; in the second, however, there is a phytomorphic motif with six petals, completely unprecedented compared to earlier floors, which would be taken up in variant form in the first half of the 13th century in the nave of the cathedral of Saints Peter and Paul in Sessa Aurunca. Immediately inside the schola cantorum is a panel containing nine rotæ having the same size but made of marble types alternating with each other, as are the cornices. The next one is almost entirely occupied by a large disc in granite with, at each corner, a considerably smaller one in porphyry. In the last one, however, placed at the foot of the central staircase for access to the chancel, there is a quincunx. The squares that make up the rest of the floor of the hall, which in the left aisle is largely lost as a result of the 1980 earthquake, in addition to the patterns also have marble elements, in the form of a rhombus, disk or vesica piscis, arranged in different ways side by side to form complex figures.

The floor of the chancel, in the area of the last bay of the nave, is traversed transversely by a concatenation, almost entirely reconstructed, of rotæ alternating in size, of which the central one is larger than all the others; each of the lateral elements is connected to the outer frame of the panel by guttae and marble ovals. A similar motif, although with circumferences exclusively of one size, can be seen on the front of the altar step, which is integrally preserved. The mosaic pavement of the apsidioles and the area in front are the result of extensive tampering.

==== Frescoes ====
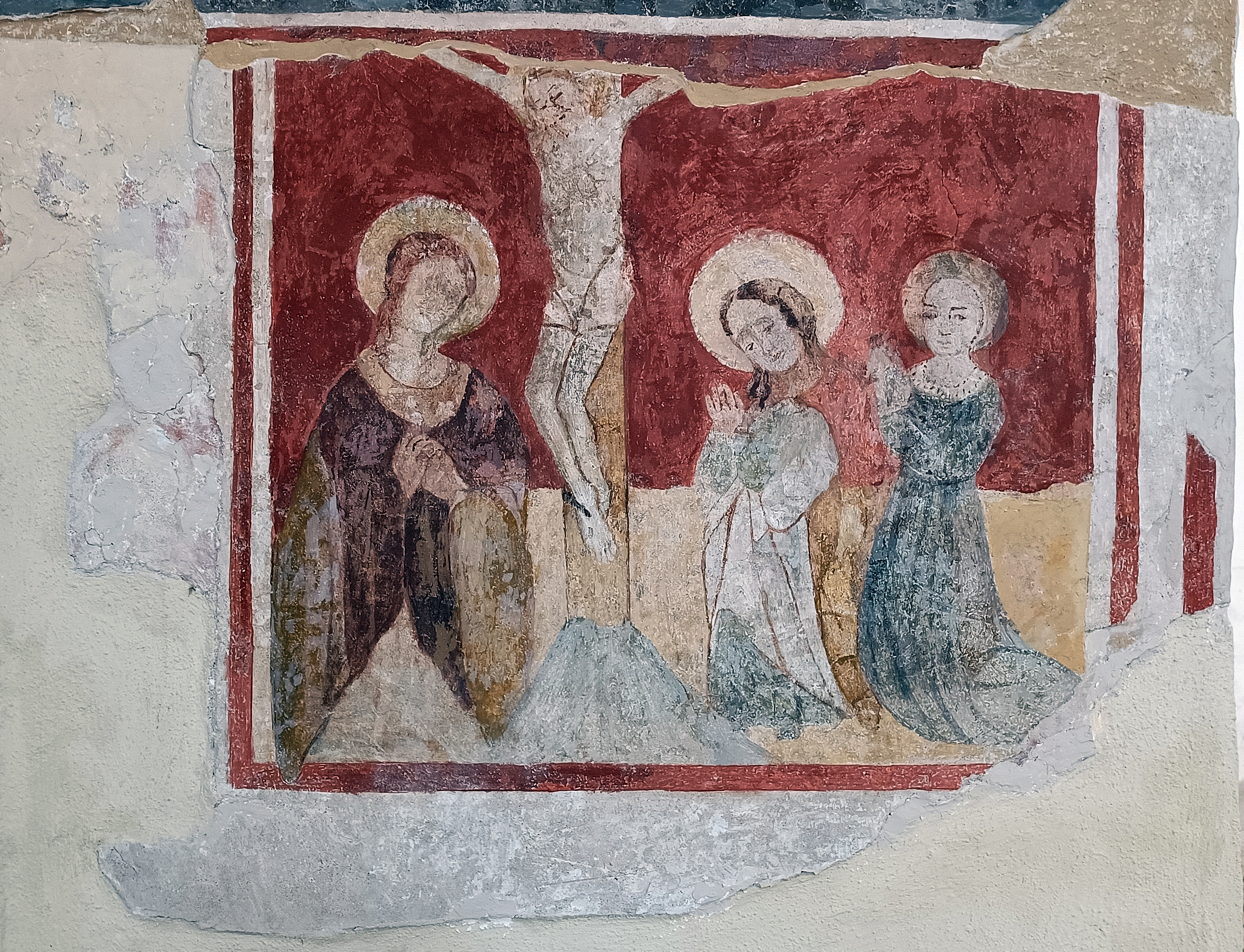
Fresco of the Crucifixion

Only a small part of the ancient frescoed wall decoration has been preserved, mostly in the area of the counter facade.

On the face of the eastern pillar facing the main nave, although in a very poor condition, there are two overlapping levels of painting, dating from two different eras: the lower one can be dated between the 12th century and the first half of the following century, and of it a beaded architectural structure (bottom) and some details of two different characters (middle) are still visible; the upper one, on the other hand, presumably depicts St. Christopher and would date from the second half of the 14th century or the beginning of the 15th. To the same area as the latter is attributable the fresco of the Madonna Enthroned with Child placed on the face facing the western pillar, below which part of a pre-existing Crucifixion with mourners and saint is visible. On the face facing the colonnade is Saint Catherine of Alexandria with donor, from the first half of the 15th century.

Pieces of fresco can also be seen in the intradoses of some of the monoforas of the nave and those of the apses, which may date back to the construction of the church, except for the one in the left apsidiole, which probably dates from the 16th century; in particular, the splay of the window above the altar is decorated with a polychrome floral motif, while the other decorations are barely visible. In addition, to the side of the right-hand staircase to the chancel, where the original presbytery area was modified to connect the three apses on the level, below today's floor level, two faux-marble mirrors are visible.

== Image gallery ==
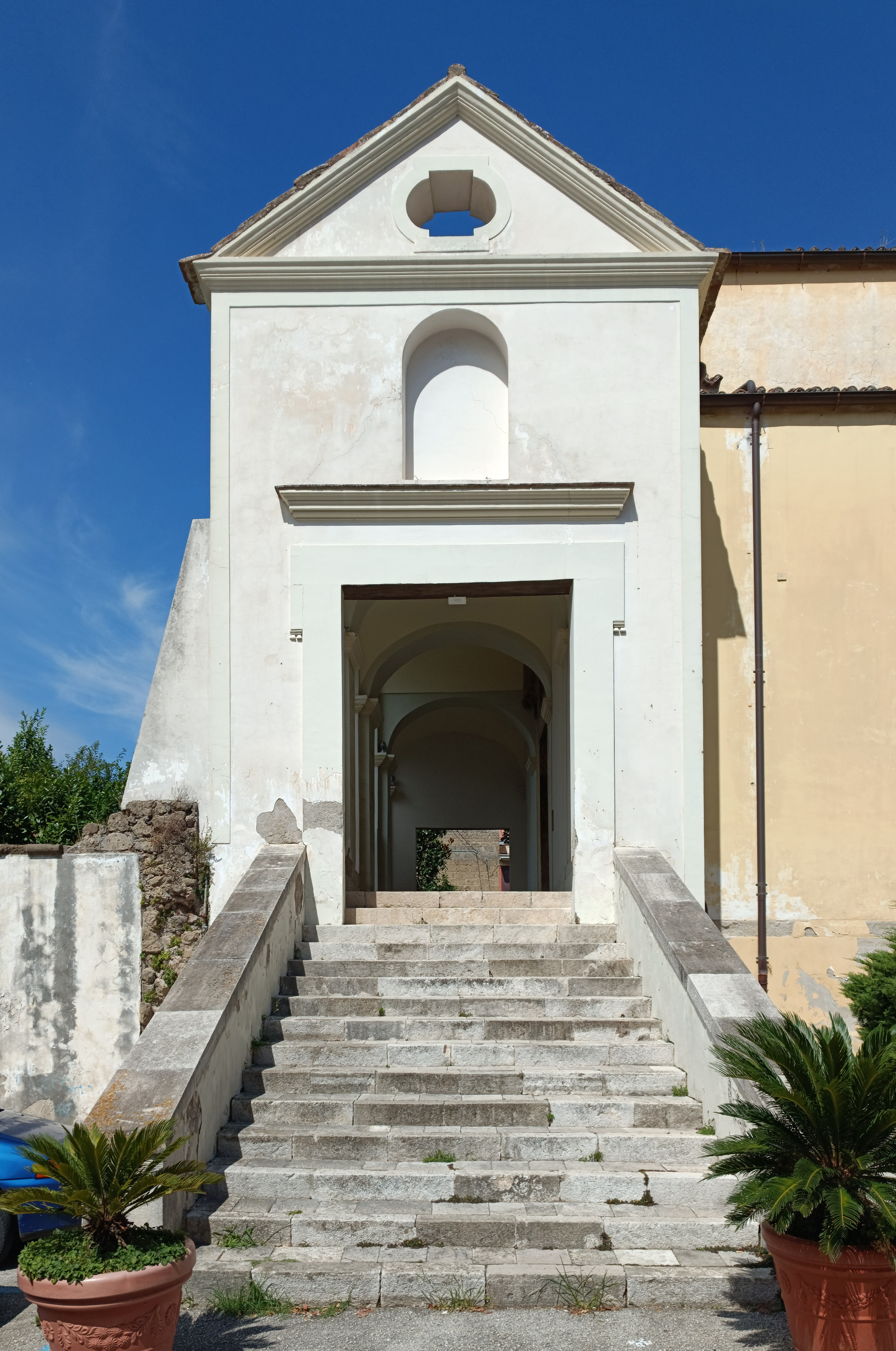
Main entrance

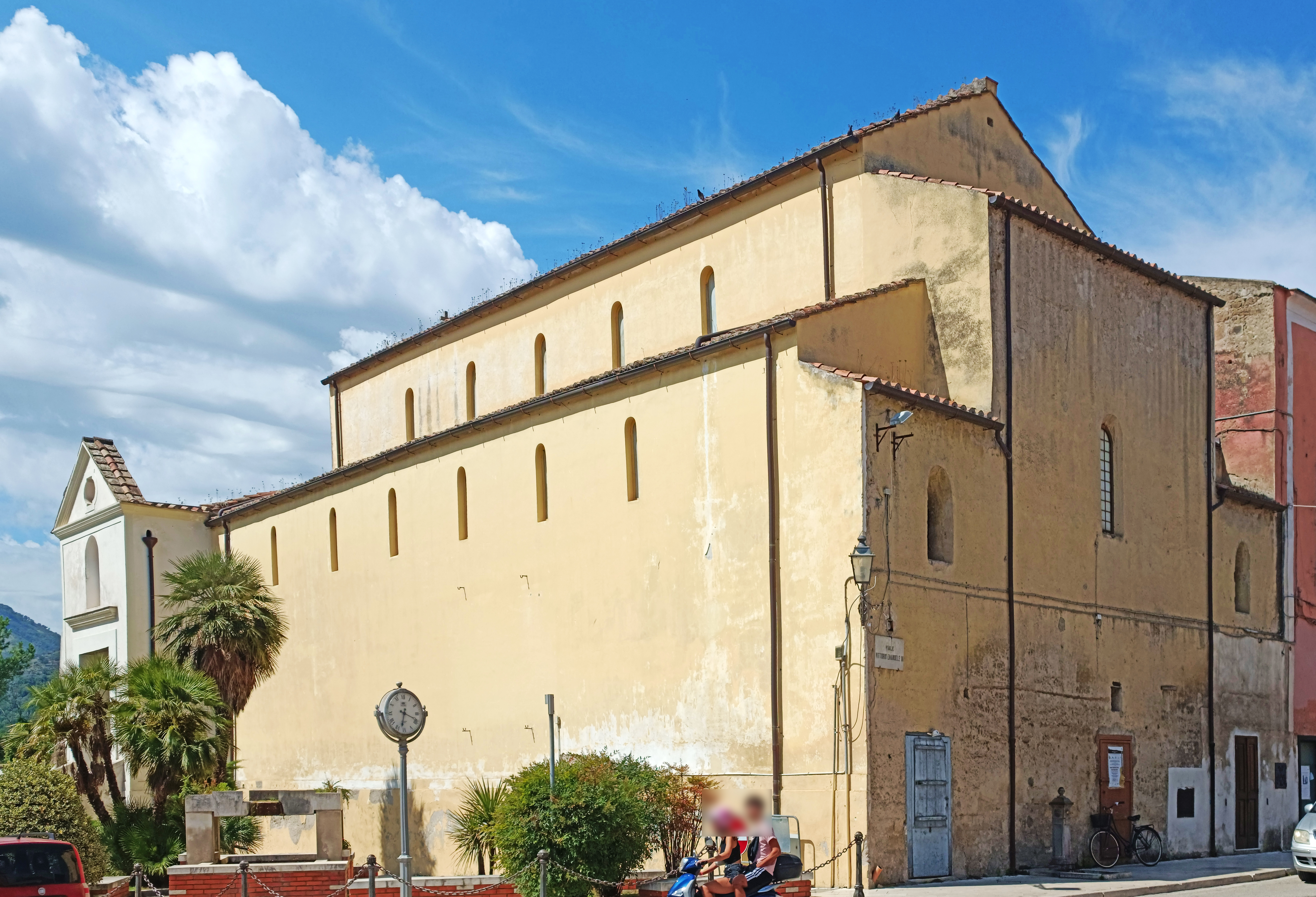
Right side and rear elevation

Interior toward the counterfacade

Left side aisle

Right side aisle

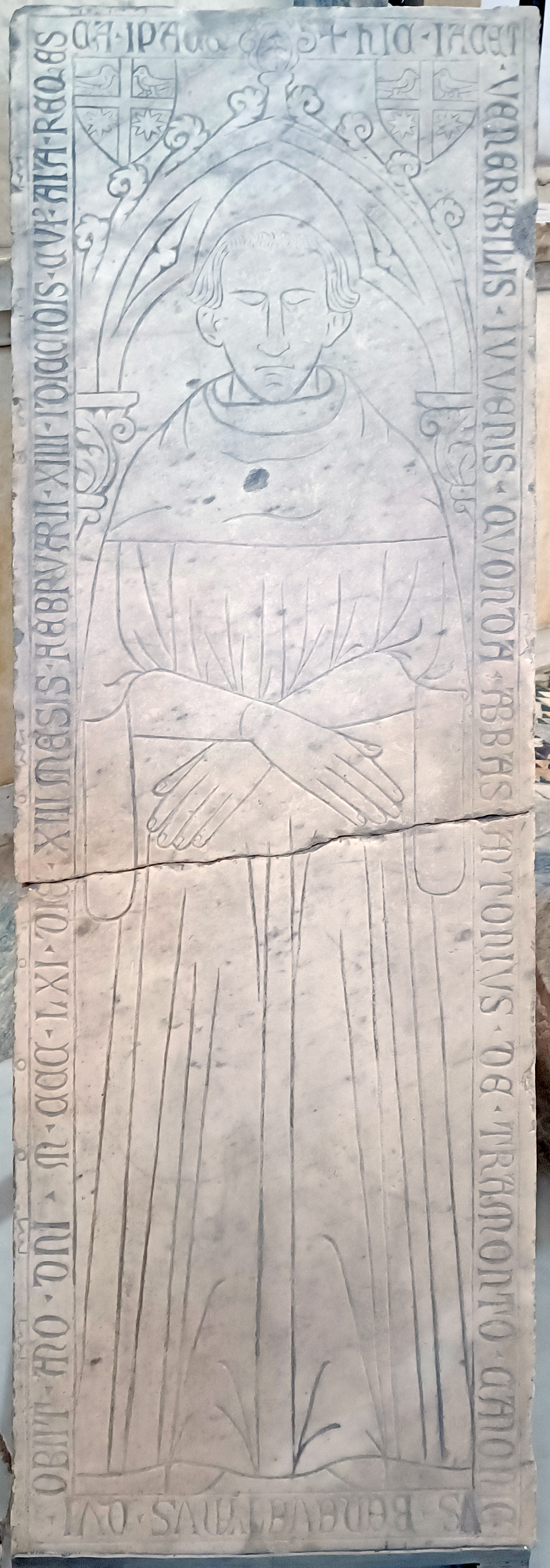
Tombstone of Antonio de Tramonto

White marble floor restorations

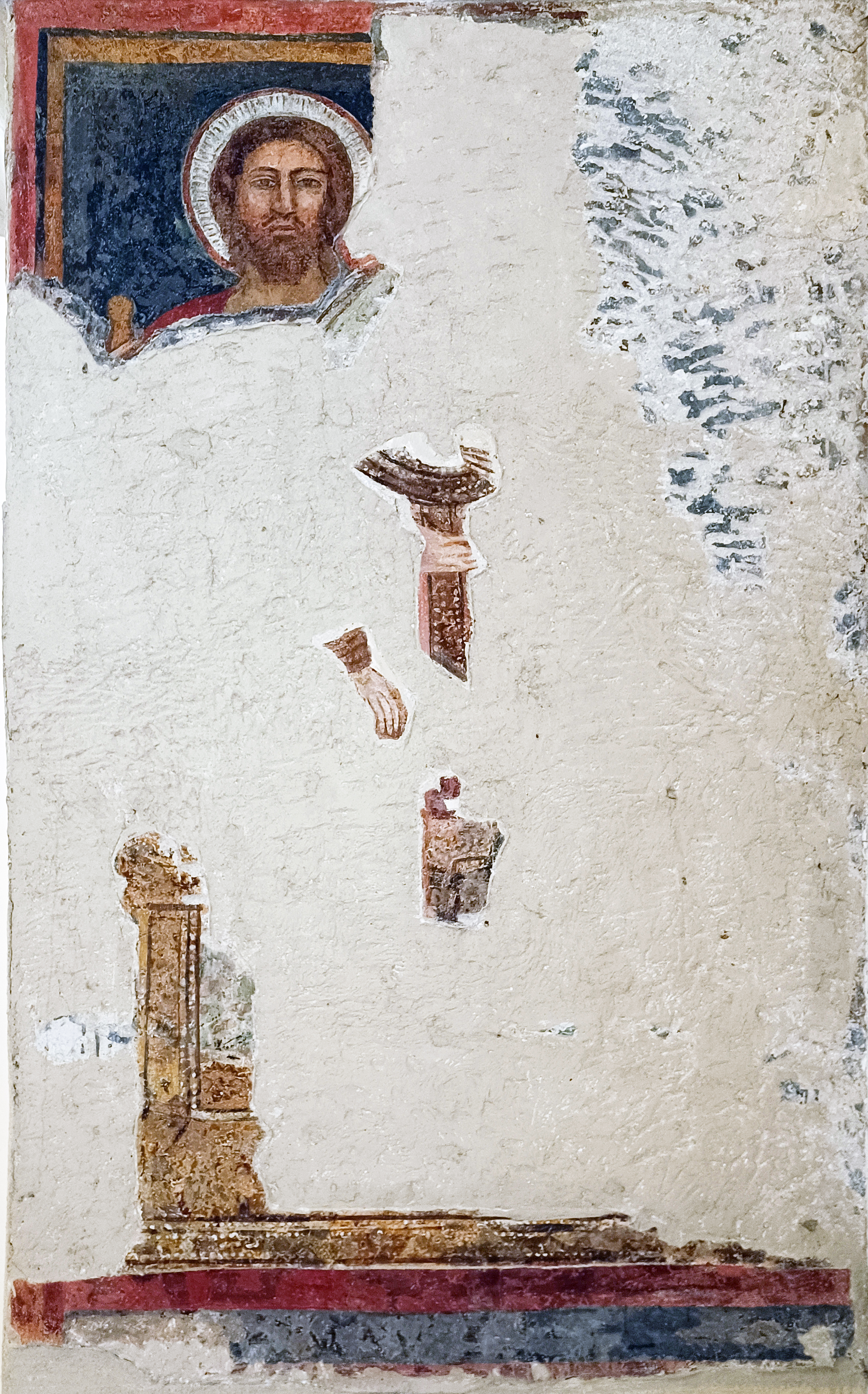
Palimpsest of frescoes on the eastern pillar

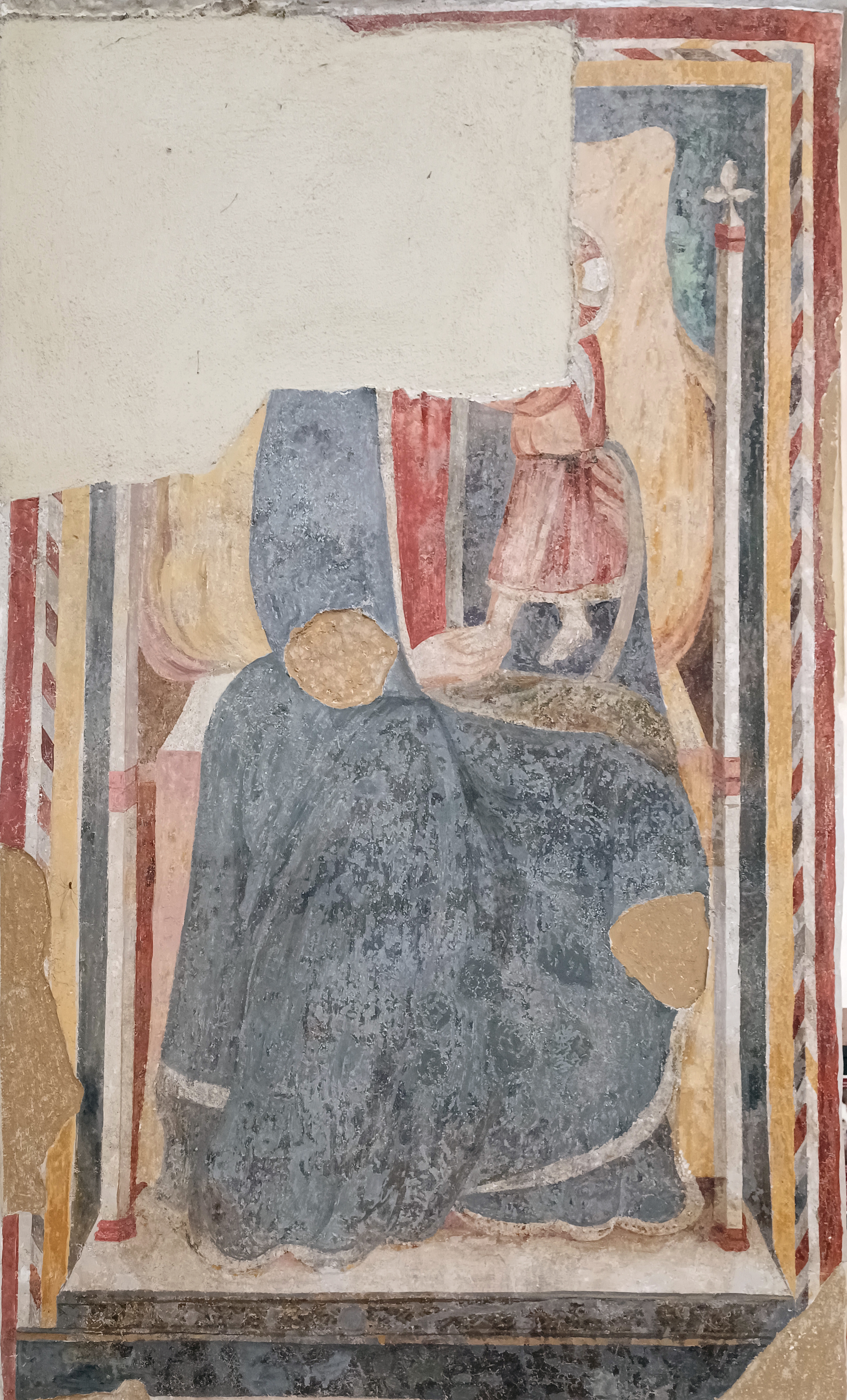
Madonna and Child (14th-15th century)

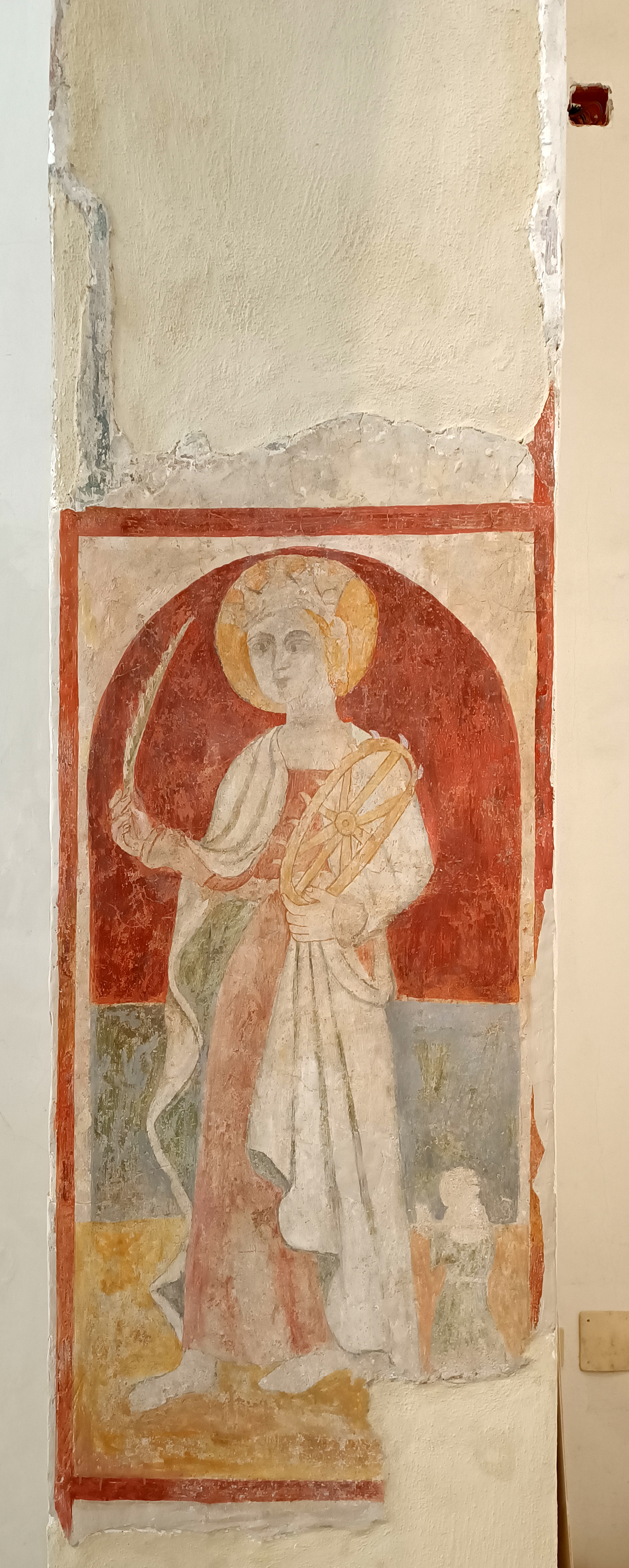
Saint Catherine of Alexandria with donor (15th century)

== See also ==
- Roman Catholic Diocese of Cerreto Sannita-Telese-Sant'Agata de' Goti

== Bibliography ==
- Antonio Abbatiello (2014). La Chiesa di San Menna nei verbali di Santa Visita. La chiesa di San Menna a Sant'Agata de' Goti. Atti del convegno di studi - 9 giugno 2010 - Sant'Agata de' Goti. pp. 273–280. ISBN 978-88-97581-22-2.
- Claudio Azzara (2014). Il papa di San Menna. Lineamenti del pontificato di Pasquale II (1099-1118). La chiesa di San Menna a Sant'Agata de' Goti. Atti del convegno di studi - 9 giugno 2010 - Sant'Agata de' Goti. pp. 11–18. ISBN 978-88-97581-22-2.
- Émile Bertaux (1896). "Per la storia dell'arte nel Napoletano - Sant'Agata dei Goti. Note". Napoli Nobilissima (I). Napoli: Arte tipografica: 3–9. ISSN 0027-7835.
- Luigi R. Cielo (1980). Monumenti romanici a S. Agata dei Goti: il Duomo e la chiesa di San Menna. Roma: Rari Nantes.
- Mario d'Onofrio, Valentino Pace (1997). La Campania. L'Italia romanica. Milano: Jaka Book. ISBN 88-16-60016-0.
- Amalia Galdi (2014). San Menna: un culto nella Campania normanna tra devozione e politica. La chiesa di San Menna a Sant'Agata de' Goti. Atti del convegno di studi - 9 giugno 2010 - Sant'Agata de' Goti. pp. 19–30. ISBN 978-88-97581-22-2.
- Francesco Gandolfo (2014). Gli scultori di San Menna. La chiesa di San Menna a Sant'Agata de' Goti. Atti del convegno di studi - 9 giugno 2010 - Sant'Agata de' Goti. pp. 175–192. ISBN 978-88-97581-22-2.
- Manuela Gianandrea (2018). Interazioni culturali ai confini del Regno: i pannelli marmorei ricomposti nella cattedrale di Gaeta. Gaeta medievale e la sua cattedrale. pp. 371–396. ISBN 978-88-85795-06-8.
- Manuela Gianandrea (2006). La scena del sacro. L'arredo liturgico del basso Lazio tra XI e XIV secolo. Roma: Viella. ISBN 978-88-8334-247-9.
- Dorothy Finn Glass (1980). Studies on cosmatesque pavements. Oxford: BAR.
- Franco Iannotta (2005). Nove secoli di storia. Cava de' Tirreni: Grafica Metelliana. pp. 7–23.
- Franco Iannotta (2014). Le reliquie di San Menna e le Ricognizioni Canoniche. La chiesa di San Menna a Sant'Agata de' Goti. Atti del convegno di studi - 9 giugno 2010 - Sant'Agata de' Goti. pp. 49–58. ISBN 978-88-97581-22-2.
- Chiara Lambert (2014). Le epigrafi medievali di San Menna: un titulus di dedicazione, una attestazione di reliquie ed una Charta lapidaria di consacrazione. La chiesa di San Menna a Sant'Agata de' Goti. Atti del convegno di studi - 9 giugno 2010 - Sant'Agata de' Goti. pp. 31–48. ISBN 978-88-97581-22-2.
- Reliquie di San Menna, San Brizio e altri Santi. Datazione radiometrica dei reperti ossei. La chiesa di San Menna a Sant'Agata de' Goti. Atti del convegno di studi - 9 giugno 2010 - Sant'Agata de' Goti. 2014. pp. 59–66. ISBN 978-88-97581-22-2.
- Leone Marsicano (1854). Acta translationis Sancti Mennatis (in Latin). Parigi: Migne. pp. 991–998.
- Ruggero Longo (2014). Il pavimento in opus sectile della chiesa di San Menna. Maestranze cassinesi a Sant'Agata de' Goti. La chiesa di San Menna a Sant'Agata de' Goti. Atti del convegno di studi - 9 giugno 2010 - Sant'Agata de' Goti. pp. 113–146. ISBN 978-88-97581-22-2.
- Ruggero Longo (2010). Opus sectile a Palermo nel secolo XII. Sinergie e mutuazioni nei cantieri di Santa Maria dell'Ammiraglio e della Cappella Palatina. Byzantino-Sicula VI: La Sicilia e Bisanzio nei secoli XI e XII. Atti delle X Giornate di Studio della Associazione Italiana di Studi Bizantini (Palermo, 27-28 maggio 2011). pp. 299–342. ISBN 978-88-904623-3-7.
- La chiesa di San Menna a Sant'Agata de' Goti. La chiesa di San Menna a Sant'Agata de' Goti. Atti del convegno di studi - 9 giugno 2010 - Sant'Agata de' Goti. 2014. pp. 73–92. ISBN 978-88-97581-22-2.
- Francesca Romana Moretti (2014). I brani di affresco supersitit nella chiesa di San Menna. La chiesa di San Menna a Sant'Agata de' Goti. Atti del convegno di studi - 9 giugno 2010 - Sant'Agata de' Goti. pp. 257–270. ISBN 978-88-97581-22-2.
- Patrizio Pensabene (2014). Il reimpiego a Sant'Agata de' Goti: San Menna, il Duomo e Sant'Angelo de Munculanis. La chiesa di San Menna a Sant'Agata de' Goti. Atti del convegno di studi - 9 giugno 2010 - Sant'Agata de' Goti. pp. 193–256. ISBN 978-88-97581-22-2.
- Eleonora Tosti (2018). Lo sviluppo architettonico e i problemi conservativi delle chiese di Santa Lucia e del Salvatore a Gaeta. Gaeta medievale e la sua cattedrale. pp. 125–144. ISBN 978-88-85795-06-8.
- Ferdinando Ughelli (1721). Italia sacra sive de Episcopis Italiae, et insularum adjacentium (in Latin) (II ed.). Venezia: Sebastiano Coleti.
- Francesco Viparelli (August 1, 1846). "Chiesa badiale del S. Menna". Poliorama Pittoresco (1). Napoli: Salvatore Pergola e Filippo Cirelli: 182.
- Francesco Viparelli (1841). Memorie istoriche della città di S. Agata de' Goti per l'epoca dal principio dell'era volgare sino al 1840. Napoli: Avallone.
- Alfonso Viparielli (1916). "Roberto normanno conte di S. Agata e la chiesa badiale di S. Menna". Rivista storica del Sannio (1). Benevento: Cooperativa Tipografi Chiostro S. Sofia: 18. ISSN 1720-0113.
