= Laiano, Sant'Agata de' Goti =

Laiano
- Frazione
- Location of Laiano in Italy
- Coordinates: 41°07′24″N 14°32′5″E
- Country: Italy
- Region: Campania
- Province: Benevento (BN)
- Comune: Sant'Agata de' Goti
- Elevation: 480 m (1,570 ft)

Population (2011)
  - Total: 198
- Time zone: UTC+1 (CET)
  - Summer (DST): UTC+2 (CEST)

Laiano is a village in Campania, southern Italy, administratively a frazione of the comune of Sant'Agata de' Goti, province of Benevento.

Laiano is about 35 km from Benevento and 10 km from Sant'Agata de' Goti.
