= Vincenzo Severino =

Italian painter

Vincenzo Severino (1859–1926) was an Italian painter, active mainly in Naples and Rome.

== Biography ==
Severino was born on March 10, 1859, in Caiazzo, near Caserta in the province of Terra di Lavoro. He studied at the Academy of Fine Arts in Naples, under Filippo Palizzi and Domenico Morelli. He painted historical, religious works, and portraits.

From 1881 onward, Severino participated in exhibitions in Naples, Rome, Milan, and Palermo. In 1887, in Rome, he exhibits two genre canvases of rustic scenes.

At the 1890 Exposition of the Promotrice in Naples, he sent a landscape with animals and figures, and a large portrait of the Admiral Doctor Von Sommer Cavalliere Guelfo. With the help of his brother Raffaello, he decorated Teatro Cimarosa of Caserta; a chapel of Signor Leonetti in Neo-Byzantine style in the Camposanto of the same city; He also painted an Invention of the Holy Cross (late 1890s) on the ceiling of the chapel for the Arciconfraternita di San Mattia Apostolo in Naples. He worked on a decorative commission for the home of Prince Ruffo-Scilla of Palazzola, depicting important dates to the Casa Ruffo. This work was used in designs for Gobelins tapestries.

He decorated in 1899 the Council Hall of the City hall of Sant'Agata de' Goti (Province of Benevento). He also painted the ceiling of the Church of the Carmine in Gragnano, and a large fresco for the Church of San Giorgio in Afragola. In 1909, he designed the cover of the book Jubilate printed on the occasion of the re-opening of the Cathedral of Nola.

In that cathedral he painted a number of works, including: the frescoes and decorations on the ceiling of the fourth chapel of the Nave (chapel of San Paolino). The frescoes in this chapel depict Seven Allegorical Angels: the first, alludes to his consular dignity; the second the Poetic Genius of the saint; the third the Artistic genius of the saint in building the Basilica of Cimitile; the fourth, his episcopal dignity; the fifth his Institution of the Countryside, the sixth his spirit of sacrifice in which he lived as a slave, and the seventh, his life as a farmer during his imprisonment. Severino painted a series of portraits inside medallions of the Bishops of Nola in the arcades and lateral walls.

Severino died on May 22, 1926, in Afragola near Naples.

His works can be seen in Caiazzo, Alvignano, Nocera Inferiore, Ottaviano, Maiori, Esperia, Pontecorvo, Rome, Crotone, Milazzo, and Alleghe (Province of Belluno).

In 2009, an exhibition was held commemorating the 150th anniversary of Severino's birth. The monograph for the exhibition, Vincenzo Severino pittore caiatino a 150 anni dalla nascita 10 marzo 1859-2009, was written by Lucia Giorgi and Pasquale Severino, grandson of the painter.
