= Sant'Agata de' Goti =

- Comune
- Comune di Sant'Agata de' Goti
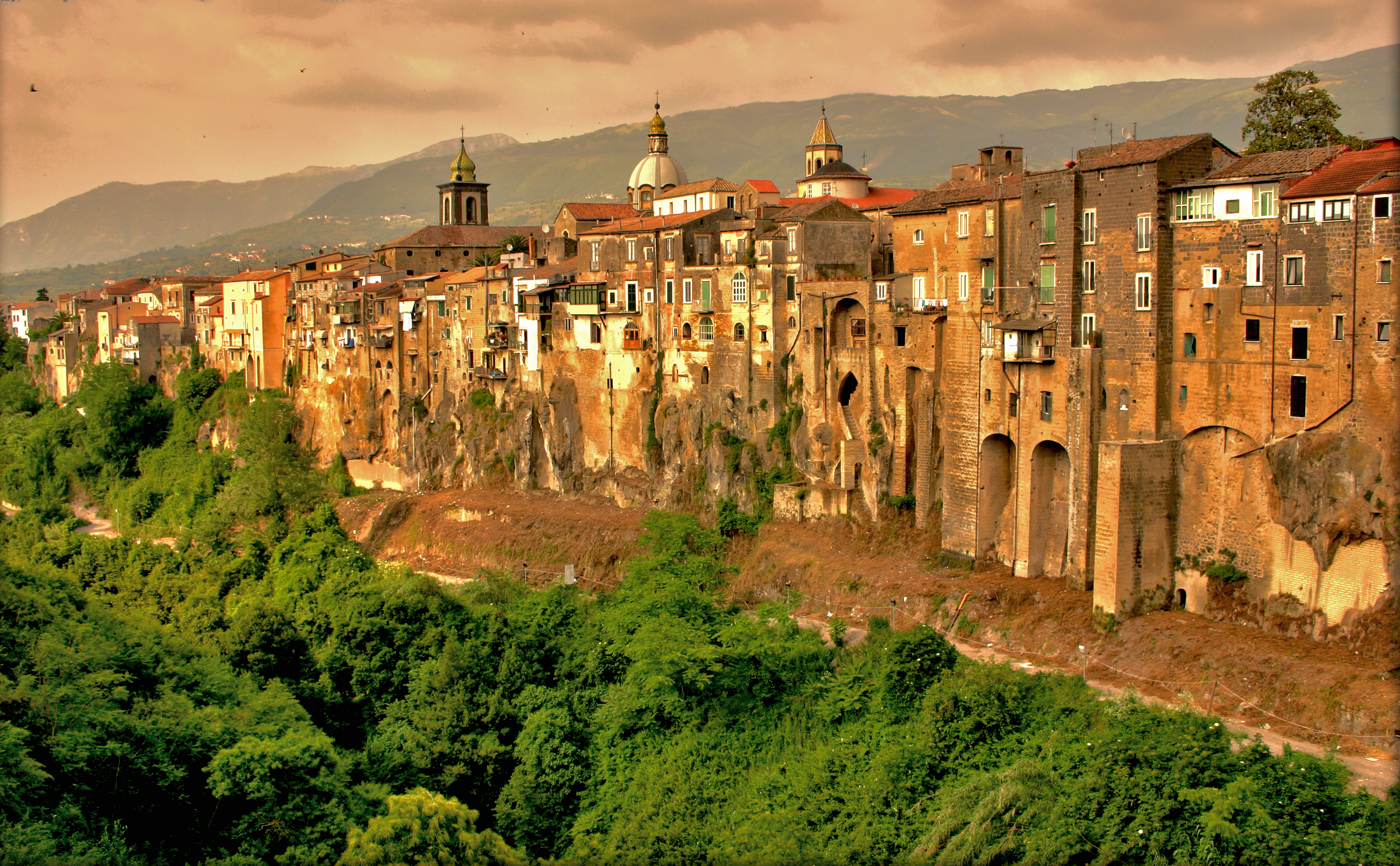
- Fortifications of Sant'Agata de' Goti

- Location within Italy Location within Campania
- Coordinates: 41°5′N 14°30′E
- Country: Italy
- Region: Campania
- Province: Province of Benevento (BN)
- Frazioni: Bagnoli, Faggiano, San Silvestro, Cantinella, Presta, Sant'Anna, Cerreta, Laiano

Government
  - Mayor: Salvatore Riccio

Area
  - Total: 62.9 km^{2} (24.3 sq mi)
- Elevation: 156 m (512 ft)

Population (1 January 2016)
  - Total: 11,216
  - Density: 178/km^{2} (462/sq mi)
- Demonym: Santagatesi
- Time zone: UTC+1 (CET)
  - Summer (DST): UTC+2 (CEST)
- Postal code: 82019
- Dialing code: 0823
- Patron saint: St. Alphonsus Liguori
- Saint day: August 1
- Website: Official website

Sant'Agata de' Goti is a comune (municipality) and former Catholic bishopric in the Province of Benevento in the Italian region Campania, located about 35 km (22 mi) northeast of Naples and about 25 km (16 mi) west of Benevento near the Monte Taburno.

== History ==
=== Prehistory and Roman Era ===
The comune of Sant’Agata de’Goti was built over the site of the city of Saticula, and artefacts that belonged to the Samnites have been found in the territory of Sant’Agata. In 343 BC, Aulus Cornelius Cossus, a Roman General, constructed a castra, which was a military base for Roman soldiers used in winter. The city of Saticula became a Roman colony following the Second Punic War.

=== Medieval Period ===
The Castrum of Sant'Agata, which originated from the settlement of Saticulan populations after 42 BC, became an important strategic centre under the Byzantines before passing under Lombard control in the 6th century, becoming a gastaldia of the Duchy of Benevento. Despite subsequent Frankish domination in the 8th and 9th centuries, the city retained a certain degree of autonomy, culminating in the creation of the Diocese of Sant'Agata de' Goti in 970.During the Norman period, starting in the 11th century under the Drengot family, the city underwent a radical urban transformation: a powerful fortified wall was built, exploiting the pre-existing quarries, making it an almost impregnable stronghold, fiercely contested between local barons, such as Rainulfo Drengot, and the Sicilian crown of Roger II, who took definitive control of it in 1139.

After a period under Swabian rule, the fiefdom of Sant'Agata de' Goti was granted by Queen Joanna I to the d'Artus family, natural descendants of Charles II of Anjou. Despite tragic internal events, culminating in the beheading of Charles II d'Artus for his involvement in the murder of Andrew of Hungary, the family retained control of the territory until the extinction of the line with Ladislaus d'Artus in 1401. Subsequently, in 1432, Queen Joanna II donated the fief to the Catalan nobleman Baldassarre De la Rath, whose family retained possession even during the transition to the Aragonese kingdom, until the marriage of Caterina de la Rath to Andrea Matteo Acquaviva, Duke of Atri and a well-known humanist prince, which sealed the union of the fief with the vast estates of the Acquaviva family.

=== Contemporary Period ===
From the 16th to the 18th century, the fiefdom of Sant'Agata de' Goti underwent intense dynastic struggles, passing from the Della Ratta family (Italianisation of the name De la Rath, with figures such as Francesco Della Ratta, husband of Donna Altobella Gesualdo, who attempted to regain control in 1585) to the Cossa family and finally, in 1696, to the Carafa della Stadera di Maddaloni, who retained possession until the abolition of feudalism, renovating the castle and turning it into their home.At the same time, the Cathedral greatly increased its economic and religious power in the area, while the city underwent significant urban and industrial development under the Bourbons: in the second half of the 18th century, infrastructure such as the Ferriera Nova along the Isclero River was built, promoted by Charles of Bourbon, and important public works were carried out, including the municipal villa in Piazza della Torricella and various public wash houses. This period of modernisation led to the creation of new squares and patrician residences. In 1566 the diocese of Sant’Agata de’Goti nominated Felice Peretti (future Pope Sixtus V) as bishop. Peretti led the modernisation of the town. In 2004 the town was awarded the “orange flag” by the Italian Touring Club.

== Main sights ==
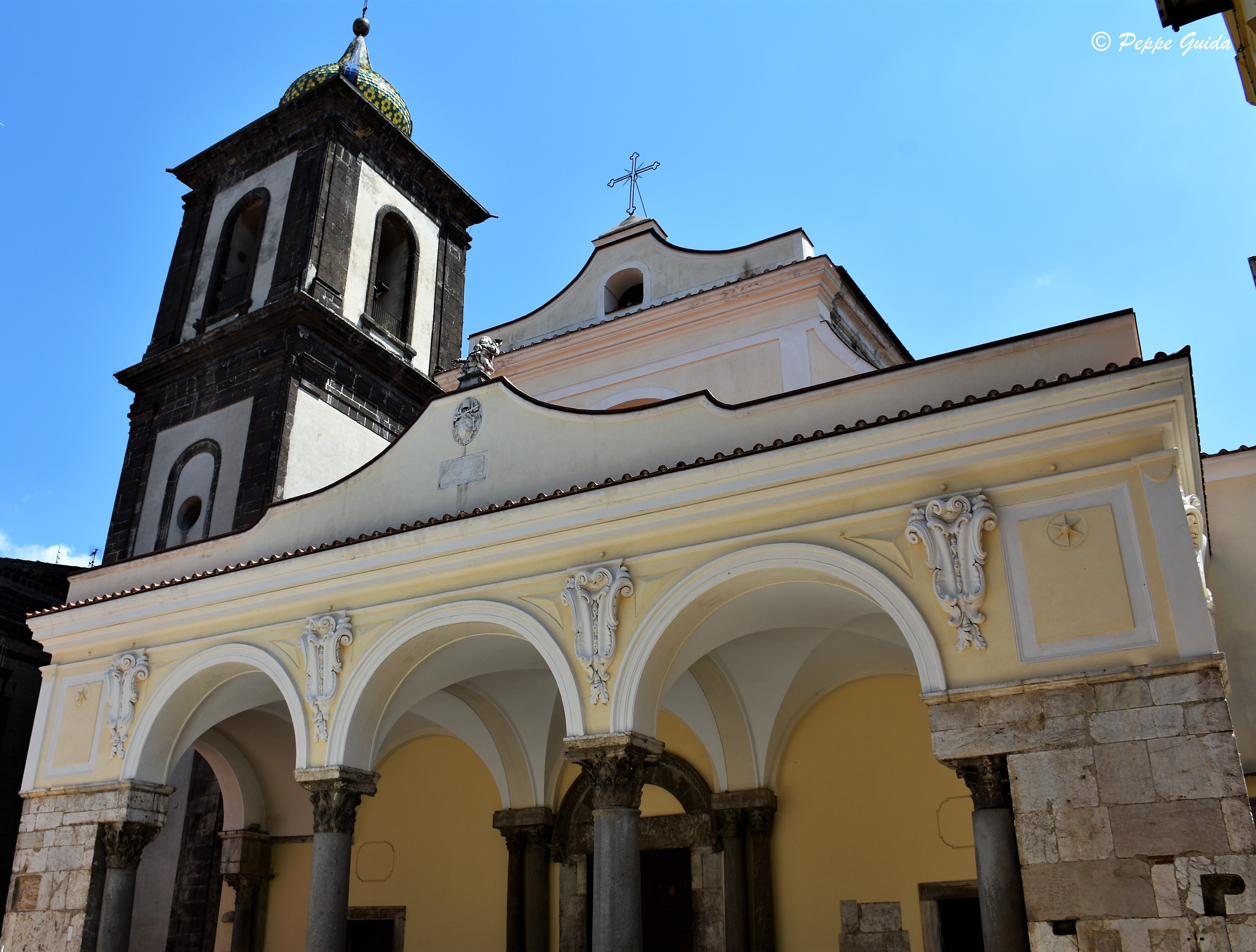
The Cathedral of Sant’Agata de’Goti

- Cathedral (Duomo), founded in the 10th century, dedicated to the Assumption of Mary. Due to the repeated reconstruction, little remains of the original edifice. The Romanesque crypt shows parts which could belong to several pre-existing buildings, including Roman or earlier ones.
- Church of San Menna (10th century).
- Castle, used as Ducal Palace.
- Palace and church of St. Francis (1282).
- Gothic church of the Annunziata (13th century). It houses 15th-century frescoes, and a diptych of the Annunciation dating to the same age.
- The Council Room in City Hall was decorated in 1899 by Vincenzo Severino.

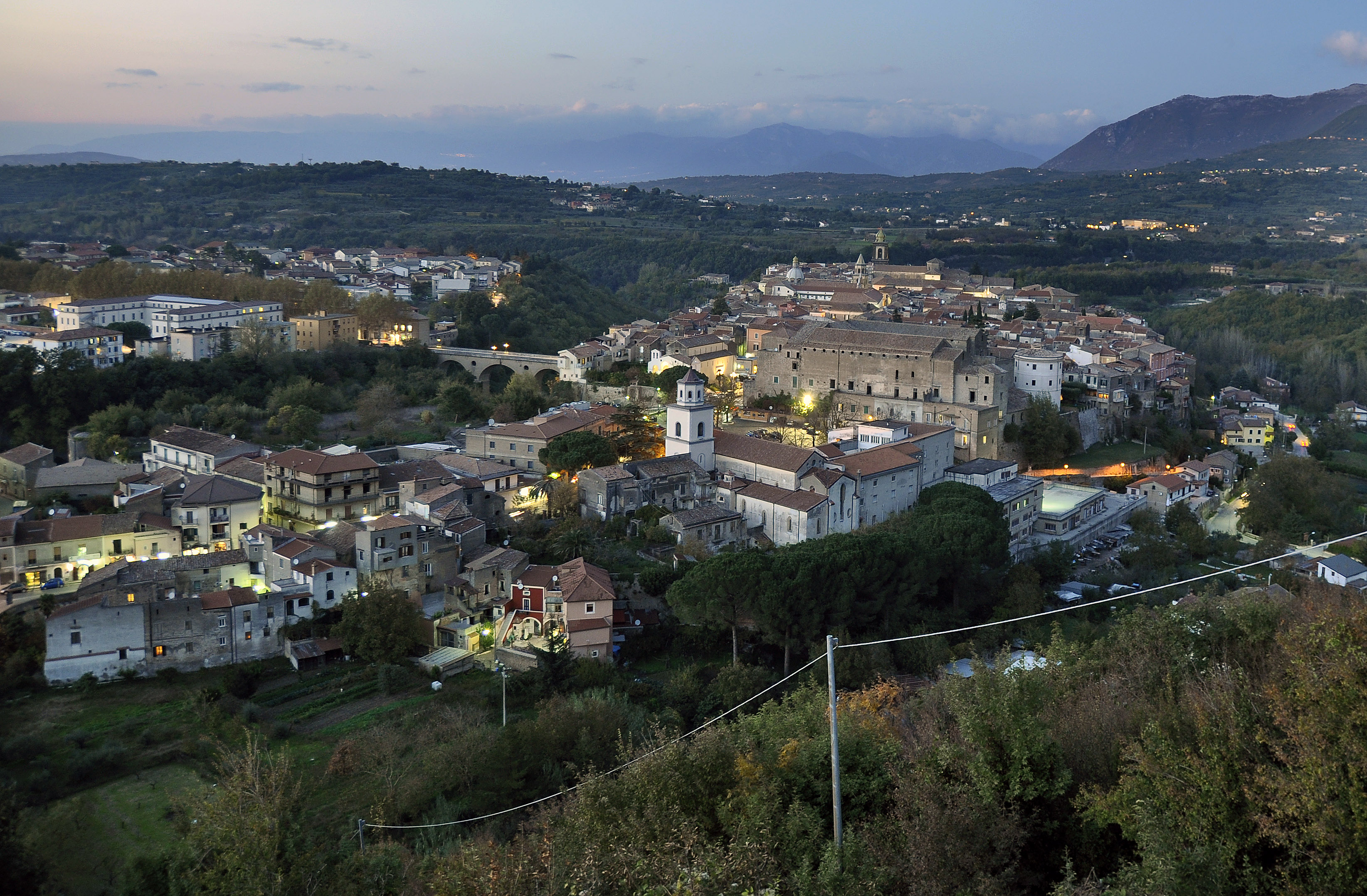
Sant'Agata de' Goti seen from above

== Notable residents ==
- Ignazio Abate (born 1986), footballer
- Giovanni de Blasio, maternal grandfather of Bill de Blasio, American politician and 110th Mayor of New York City
- Giovanni Fusco (1906–1968), Italian composer
- Tarcisio Fusco (1904–1962), Italian composer

== See also ==
- List of Catholic dioceses in Italy

== Sources and external links ==
- GCatholic, with Google photo - co-cathedral
