= Caiazzo Cathedral =

Roman Catholic church in Caserta, Italy

Coordinates: 41.1775°N 14.3673°E

Caiazzo Cathedral (Italian: Duomo di Caiazzo, Basilica concattedrale di Maria Santissima Assunta e Santo Stefano Vescovo) is a Roman Catholic church in Caiazzo, province of Caserta, Italy, dedicated to the Virgin Mary and Saint Stephen the Bishop. It was previously the cathedral (episcopal seat) of the diocese of Caiazzo, until in 1986 it became a co-cathedral in the present Diocese of Alife-Caiazzo, which was formed in that year by merging the two older dioceses of Caiazzo and Alife. In 2013 it was declared a minor basilica.

== History ==
The church is believed to be built on the site of a pagan Roman temple. The capitals of the earlier church building were taken from a Roman structure. The church has been much rebuilt over the centuries.
