= Sant'Angelo in Formis =

Church in Formis, Italy

Coordinates: 41.118417°N 14.26035°E

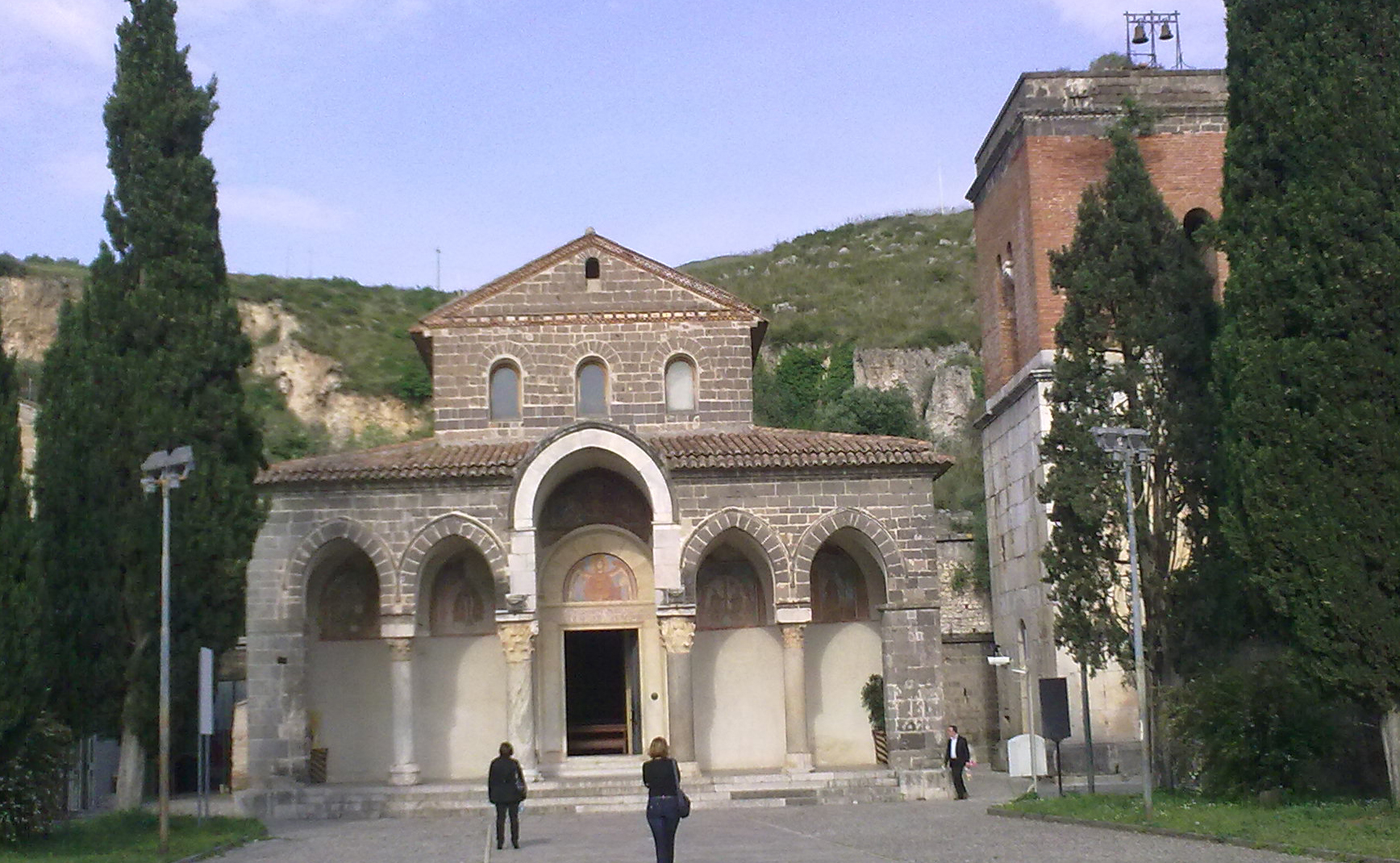
Façade of the abbey.

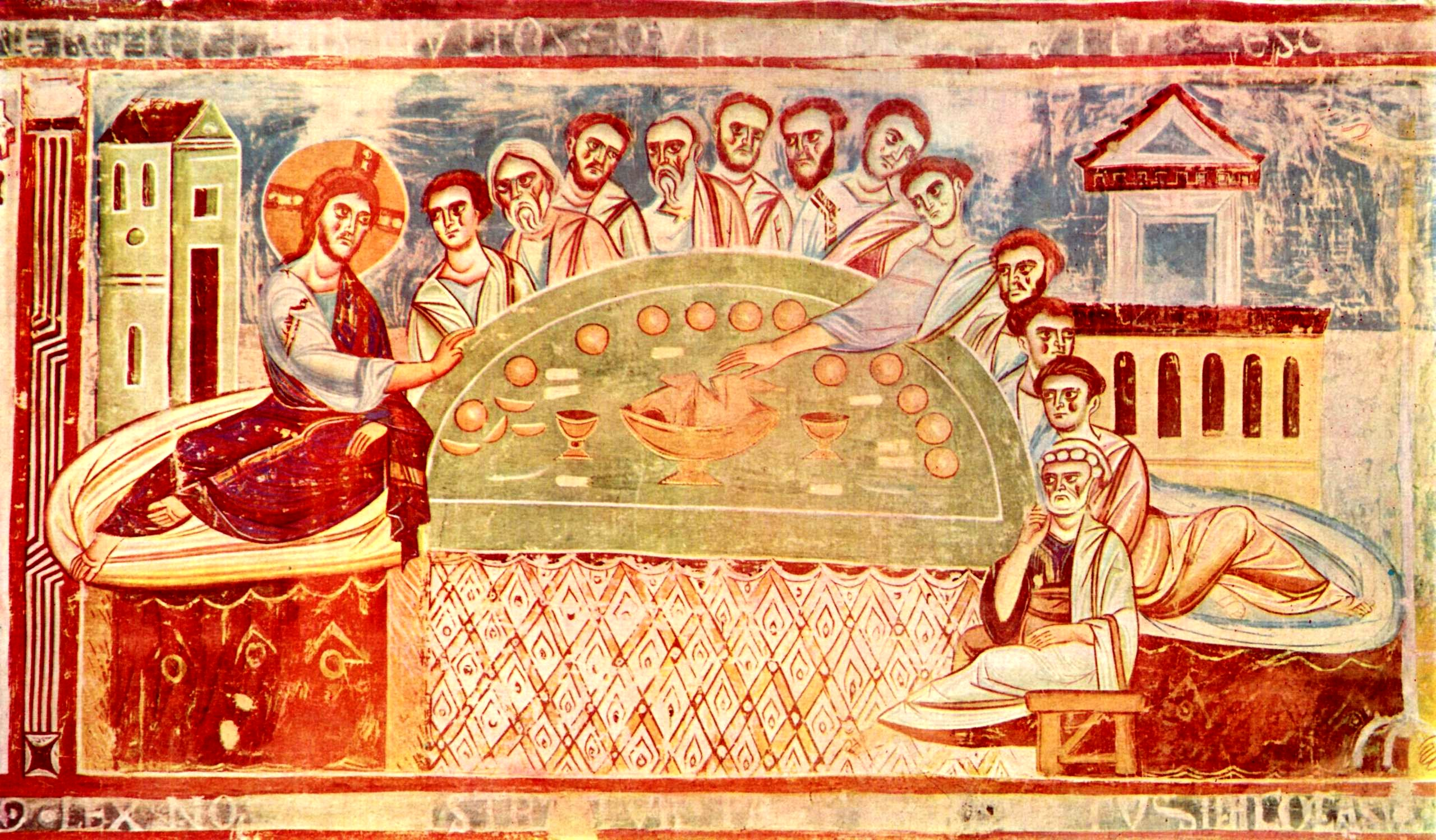
Fresco depicting the Last Supper, around 1100

Sant'Angelo in Formis is an abbey in the municipality of Capua in southern Italy. The church, dedicated to St Michael the Archangel, lies on the western slopes of Monte Tifata.

== History ==
The church was once referred to as ad arcum Dianae ("near the Arch of Diana"), as it lies on the remains of a Roman temple to that goddess.

The church was built in the eleventh century by Desiderius, the abbot of Monte Cassino, who also rebuilt that abbey. At Monte Cassino the decoration was carried out by Byzantine (Greek) artists hired from Constantinople and the decoration of Sant'Angelo displays a mingling of the Byzantine (Eastern) and Latin (Western) traditions. The frescos were painted by Greek artists and by Italian pupils trained in their methods.

== Decoration ==
Examples of the mingling of Byzantine and Latin styles (as cited by James Hall) include:

1. The "lunette over the entrance with a half-length figure of St. Michael and above him an orant Virgin in a medallion supported by flying angels, with an inscription in Greek on the lintel at the foot. The treatment is wholly Byzantine except for the Latin motif of a crown on the Virgin's head".

2. The evangelists around the enthroned Christ in the Apse are in the form of the four symbolic creatures of the Latin tradition, rather than being shown as figures (often seating at writing desks) in the Greek manner.

3. Subjects from the Old Testament and New Testament line the walls of the nave. The content of individual scenes and the grouping of figures is described by Hall as being "typically Byzantine", but the whole forms an historical narrative series on the Western model, evidently just as in the basilicas of early Christian Rome.
