= Galanti (surname) =

Galanti is a surname. Notable people with the surname include:

- Giuseppe Maria Galanti (1743–1806), Italian historian and economist
- Luigi Galanti (1765–1836), Italian geographer and politician
- Omar Galanti (born 1973), Italian pornographic actor
- Paul Galanti (1939–2014), American Vietnam War veteran
- Yitzhak Galanti (1937–2012), Israeli politician
