= Transumanza =

The transumanza is the Italian term for transhumance, the traditional twice yearly migration of sheep and cows from the highlands to the lowlands, and back. The word literally means "crossing the land".

== Ancient custom ==
Transhumance is an ancient Italian custom, by which large flocks of sheep in the mid fall were driven south from the hilly and mountainous regions of the Apennines to winter over in the more southern coastal plains of Apulia and, less commonly, Lazio. A much more limited version of these migrations took place in the Alpine and Prealpine areas of Valle d'Aosta, Lombardy and Piedmont. In the mid spring of each year this migratory pattern was reversed as the herds traveled to the fresher and greener pastures of the higher Apennine elevations in the Abruzzo Region of Italy. Over the years transhumance affected the entire economy of Apulia, strongly favoring the clearing of land for sheep grazing at the expense of agriculture and forestry.

== Shepherding ==
In past centuries, the Transumanza had a great impact on the lives of the shepherds whose job was made more difficult by the lack of modern agricultural machinery, enclosed pens for grazing, and refrigeration of the sheep's milk that was gathered along the way. Economic concerns were established at the grazing sites, these dealing with the production and sale of cheese, sheepskins, and wool. Much of the work was carried out by men with women remaining behind in Abruzzo. The well-worn paths along which the sheep traveled during their migrations were referred to as "tratturi". The three main pathways included those between L'Aquila and Foggia (called "The King's pathway"), Celano and Foggia, and Pescasseroli and Candela ("The wool pathway"). The migrations many times lasted up to two weeks with stops at locations known as "stazioni di posta" (post stations).

In earlier times, sheep migrations similar to the transumanza were also conducted in Spain and the Balkan states. The custom was at its peak in the fifteenth century following the population losses in the area due to the Black Plague.
