= Antonio Di Maria =

Italian politician (born 1971)

President of the Province of Benevento
- In office 1 November 2018 – 13 June 2022
- Preceded by: Claudio Ricci
- Succeeded by: Nino Lombardi

Mayor of Santa Croce del Sannio
- In office 28 May 2007 – 13 June 2022
- Preceded by: Antonio Di Maria
- Succeeded by: Antonio Zeoli

Personal details
- Born: 2 March 1972 (age 54) Santa Croce del Sannio, Province of Benevento, Italy
- Party: Us of the Centre

Antonio Di Maria (born 2 March 1971) is an Italian politician who served as president of the Province of Benevento from 2018 to 2022 and as mayor of Santa Croce del Sannio from 2007 to 2022.

== Early life and education ==
Antonio Di Maria was born 2 March 1971 in Santa Croce del Sannio.

Di Maria holds a qualification of a high school diploma, his highest qualification. He completed his secondary education with a specialisation in accounting and commerce.

== Political career ==
Di Maria was first elected to the municipal council of Santa Croce del Sannio in 1995, also serving as assessor. Re-elected in 1999 and 2004, he became mayor in 2007 following the resignation of the previous mayor, also named Antonio Di Maria. He served as mayor for three terms until 13 June 2022.

In October 2009, Di Maria became president of the Comunità Montana Titerno–Alto Tammaro, an intermunicipal body focused on rural development, environmental management, and cooperation among mountain municipalities in the Benevento area. He was unanimously elected thanks to an agreement between the People of Freedom (PDL) and the United Democrats (UDEUR). Di Maria replaced Innocenzo Pugliese as president. He served until 23 January 2020, being succeeded by Gianfranco Rinaldi (mayor of Pontelandolfo).

On 31 October 2018, Di Maria was elected president of the Province of Benevento, taking office on 1 November 2018. Winning with 57% of the vote, Di Maria defeated the center-left candidate Franco Damiano, mayor of Montesarchio. Di Maria won under the banner of the Us of the Centre party. Commenting on the election, Clemente Mastella described Di Maria's victory as a "revitalization" of the centre-right, which had previously struggled to gain control in the region.

Following a corruption scandal involving him, Di Maria temporarily stepped down from the presidency of the Province of Benevento on 24 November 2021, with vice president Nino Lombardi taking over his duties. He formally ceased to hold office on 13 June 2022.

In 2023, Di Maria became president of the Alto Tammaro Local Action Group, operating within the European Union's rural development framework. On 22 November 2024, he was elected to the National Council of the National Association of Italian Municipalities (ANCI). From 2024 to 2026, he was president of Sannio Smart Land, an association involved in implementing projects related to Italy's National Strategy for Inner Areas.

== Legal proceedings ==
In November 2021, Di Maria became involved in a public procurement investigation led by the Public Prosecutor's Office of Benevento concerning alleged irregularities in contracts involving the Province of Benevento, the Province of Caserta, and the municipality of Buonalbergo. The investigation originated from a complaint by a provincial engineer regarding an alleged attempted corruption act connected to a public tender procedure. The inquiry was conducted by the Carabinieri under the coordination of the Benevento Prosecutor's Office and involved wiretaps, recordings and digital surveillance activities. Prosecutors alleged the existence of a system aimed at influencing public tenders through corruption, bid rigging and administrative manipulation involving 11 procurement procedures related mainly to road works, school projects and environmental safety.

On 24 November 2021, Di Maria was placed under house arrest together with seven other individuals, while other suspects received temporary restrictions from contracting with the public administration. The charges included alleged aggravated corruption, interference with public tenders, disclosure of official secrets, attempted undue inducement, attempted extortion and other administrative offences.

According to prosecutors, Di Maria allegedly used political influence to favour predetermined companies and professionals in public tenders, while investigators claimed that some procedures had been manipulated through prior agreements. Prosecutors also ordered the precautionary seizure of approximately €49,500 allegedly connected to corruption offences.

In December 2021, the Tribunale del Riesame of Naples partially accepted Di Maria's appeal, replacing house arrest with a temporary suspension from public office. Following the preliminary investigation, several defendants were ordered to stand trial, with proceedings scheduled to begin in September 2022. Di Maria denied any wrongdoing.

In June 2026, the Court of Benevento issued a first-instance verdict, sentencing Di Maria to three years and two months' imprisonment. The trial ended with 16 convictions and six acquittals among the 22 defendants involved in the proceedings. The verdict remains subject to appeal.
