= List of mayors of Santa Croce del Sannio =

Mayor of Santa Croce del Sannio
- Sindaco di Santa Croce del Sannio
- Incumbent; Antonio Zeoli since 12 June 2022
- Appointer: Popular election
- Term length: 5 years, renewable once
- Website: Official website

The Mayor in Santa Croce del Sannio is the head of the municipal government of the comune of Santa Croce del Sannio, in the province of Benevento, Campania, Italy.

In 1995 direct election of the municipality's mayor was introduced following the Law no. 81 on 25 March 1993.

The current mayor is Antonio Zeoli, who took office on 12 June 2022.

== List ==
#	Mayor	Elected	Left office	Party	Notes
	Antonio Di Maria	4 June 1985	31 May 1990	DC	
	Antonio Di Maria	31 May 1990	24 April 1995	DC	
	Pietro Capozzi	24 April 1995	14 June 1999	CCD	
	Antonio Di Maria	14 June 1999	14 June 2004	Udeur	
	Antonio Di Maria	14 June 2004	6 February 2007	Civic	Left office 6 February 2007 due to resignation of many councillors
	Antonio Di Maria	29 May 2007	7 May 2012	Civic	
	Antonio Di Maria	7 May 2012	12 June 2017	Civic	
	Antonio Di Maria	12 June 2017	13 June 2022	Civic	
	Antonio Zeoli	13 June 2022	Incumbent	Civic	

== Mayoral elections ==
=== 1993 election ===
Municipal elections 23 April 1995
Candidate	Santa Croce del Sannio			Notes
Candidate	Votes	%	Seats	Notes
Pietro Capozzi	486	66.48%	8	
Cosimo Carmine Cassetta	167	22.85%	3	
Angela Maria Zeoli	78	10.67%	1	
Total Counted Votes	731	100.00%	12	

=== 1999 election ===
Municipal elections 13 June 1999
Candidate	Santa Croce del Sannio			Notes
Candidate	Votes	%	Seats	Notes
Antonio Di Maria	338	45.37%	8	
Angela Maria Zeoli	227	30.47%	2	
Cosimo Carmine Cassetta	180	24.16%	2	
Total Counted Votes	745	100.00%	12	

=== 2004 election ===
Municipal elections 12 June 2004
Candidate	Santa Croce del Sannio			Notes
Candidate	Votes	%	Seats	Notes
Antonio Di Maria	421	68.90%	8	
Angela Maria Zeoli	190	31.10%	4	
Total Counted Votes	611	100.00%	12	

=== 2007 election ===
Municipal elections 27 May 2007
Candidate	Santa Croce del Sannio			Notes
Candidate	Votes	%	Seats	Notes
Antonio Di Maria	471	59.70%	8	
Domenico Maria	318	40.30%	4	
Total Counted Votes	789	100.00%	12	

=== 2012 election ===
Municipal elections 6 May 2012
Candidate	Santa Croce del Sannio			Notes
Candidate	Votes	%	Seats	Notes
Antonio Di Maria	570	90.91%	4	Went under 'PROGETTO INSIEME''
Sebastiano Micco	57	9.09%	2	Went under 'IDEE IN COMUNE'
Total Counted Votes	627	100.00%	6	

=== 2017 election ===
Municipal elections 11 June 2017
Candidate	Santa Croce del Sannio			Notes
Candidate	Votes	%	Seats	Notes
Antonio Di Maria	423	65.58%	7	Went under 'PROGETTO INSIEME''
Mariarita Salerno	222	34.42%	3	Went under 'LAVORO E FUTURO'
Total Counted Votes	645	100.00%	10	

=== 2022 election ===
Municipal elections 21 June 2022
Candidate	Santa Croce del Sannio			Notes
Candidate	Votes	%	Seats	Notes
Antonio Zeoli	453	83.89%	7	
Giovanni Vitale	84	15.56%	3	
Giovanni Spagnuolo	2	0.37%	0	
Rinaldo Oropallo	1	0.19%	0	
Aurelio Mennitti	0	0.00%	0	
Total Counted Votes	540	100.00%	10	

== See also ==
- Santa Croce del Sannio
