= Suellia gens =

Ancient Roman family

The gens Suellia was a minor plebeian family at ancient Rome. Members of this gens first appear in the time of the Republic, but few are mentioned by ancient writers. Others are known from inscriptions. The Suellii are easily confused with the Suilii, although there is a possibility that the two gentes were in fact identical. The most illustrious of this family was probably Gnaeus Suellius Rufus Marcianus, who was consul during the reign of Commodus.

== Origin ==
The nomen Suellius appears to belong to a class of gentilicia typically formed from cognomina with diminutive endings, such as -ulus, or the double diminutive -illus, but occasionally formed directly from surnames without these endings. The greater number of Suellii mentioned in inscriptions came from Samnium, strongly indicating that this gens was of Samnite origin.

== Praenomina ==
The Suellii used a variety of common praenomina, chiefly Marcus, Gnaeus, and Gaius. One of the earlier inscriptions provides an example of the relatively distinctive praenomen Vibius, which was relatively uncommon at Rome, although more abundant in the countryside.

== Branches and cognomina ==
Most of the Suellii known from epigraphy lived during imperial times, when the surnames assumed by the Roman nobility were highly changeable, but a distinct family of the Suellii at Ligures Baebiani, where they bore the cognomina Flaccus and Rufus. Both of these belonged to an abundant type of cognomen derived from the physical features of individuals, with Flaccus designating someone flabby, or with large or floppy ears, while Rufus, "reddish", usually referred to someone with red hair. This family may have originated at Beneventum. Quartus, the surname of a colonial family of north Africa, would originally have designated a fourth son or fourth child.

== Members ==
This list includes abbreviated praenomina. For an explanation of this practice, see filiation.

- Suellia, buried in a second-century family sepulchre at Aufidena in Samnium.
- Suellius, buried at Beneventum in Samnium, with a monument from his parents.
- Suellius, buried in a first-century tomb at Herculaneum in Campania.
- Suellius, named in an inscription from Onnum in Britannia, dating between the middle of the second century and the end of the third.
- Gaius Suellius, named in an inscription from Rome.
- Gaius Suellius P. f., named in an inscription from Venafrum in Samnium, dating between 50 and 20 BC.
- Gnaeus Suellius, buried in a first-century tomb at Uria in Apulia, dedicated by his wife, Suellia Primigenia, and daughter, Suellia Festa.
- Gnaeus Suellius Cn. f., a quaestor from Beneventum, named together with several others in an inscription dating from the middle or late third century BC.
- Quintus Suellius Q. f., an eques, and one of the local magistrates at Peltuinum in Samnium during the middle or late first century BC, along with Gaius Suellius Aemilianus.
- Vibius Suellius C. f., an eques, and one of the aediles at Peltuinum during the first half of the first century BC.
- Gaius Suellius T. f. Aemilianus, an eques, and one of the local magistrates at Peltuinum during the middle or late first century BC, along with Quintus Suellius.
- Marcus Suellius M. l. Amabilis, one of the freedmen of Marcus Suellius Cruscillio, named in an inscription from Ostia in Latium, dating from the first half of the first century.
- Suellia Ɔ. P. l. Anna, the freedwoman of Publius Suellius Luscus and his wife, and the wife of Quintus Vergilius Philotimus, was buried with her husband at Ostia, in a sepulchre built by Quintus Vergilius Amphio and Quintus Vergilius Apollonius for them, their freedman, Quintus Vergilius Hilarus, Quintus Vergilius R[...], and Quintus Vergilius Pansa.
- Lucius Suellius L. l. Apollonius, a freedman named in a sepulchral inscription from Rome, dating to the first half of the first century, along with Suellia Praesta.
- Gnaeus Suellius Aprilis, named in an inscription from Carnuntum in Pannonia Superior.
- Marcus Suellius M. l. Bargates, one of the freedmen of Marcus Suellius Cruscillio, named in an inscription from Ostia, dating from the first half of the first century.
- Suellia M. l. Calemera, the freedwoman of Marcus Suellius Cruscillio, named in an inscription from Ostia, dating from the first half of the first century.
- Gnaeus Suellius Classetianus Bassus, buried at Beneventum, in a tomb dating to the latter half of the third century, aged forty years, six months.
- Suellia C. f. Consanica, the priestess of Ceres and Libera, was buried at Aesernia in Samnium, in a tomb dating between 50 BC and AD 50.
- Marcus Suellius Cruscellio, the former master of the freedmen Marcus Suellius Amabilis, Marcus Suellius Bargates, Suellia Calemera, Marcus Suellius Primus, Marcus Suellius Secundus, and Marcus Suellius Zeno, named in an inscription from Ostia, dating from the first half of the first century.
- Sextus Suellius Dama[...], dedicated a sepulchre at Beneventum for himself, his wife, Suellia Salvia, and their family.
- Gnaeus Suellius Cn. l. Eros, a freedman named in a sepulchral inscription from Ligures Baebiani in Samnium.
- Gnaeus Suellius Eutyches, named in an inscription from Pagus Vetanus in Samnium.
- Suellia Cn. f. Festa, along with her mother, Suellia Primigenia, dedicated a first-century tomb at Uria to her father, Gnaeus Suellius.
- Suellius Flaccus, listed among the property owners at Ligures Baebiani in AD 101; his property was valued at 120,000 sestertii. He might be the same as the legate Gnaeus Suellius Flaccus. Either he or another Suellius Flaccus is listed later, together with Suellius Rufus, with property valued at 109,000 sestertii.
- Gnaeus Suellius Flaccus, legate of the Legio III Augusta in Africa Proconsularis in AD 87, dedicated an altar to Jupiter at Theveste. He may be the same Suellius Flaccus who later lived at Ligures Baebiani.
- Suellia Fortunata, buried at Rome, aged seventy-five.
- Suellius Fortunatus, a member of the builders' guild at Ostia in AD 198.
- Quintus Suellius Fortunius, a young man buried at Rome during the latter half of the second century, aged twenty-five years, ten months, and twenty-five days, in a tomb dedicated by his father.
- Suellia Grata, buried at Rome during the early second century, in a tomb dedicated by her husband, Lucius Annius Esychus.
- Marcus Suellius Hermes, buried at Ostia between AD 50 and 150, in a tomb dedicated by his wife, Suellia Psyche.
- Marcus Suellius M[...]s, one of the municipal duumvirs at Ostia in AD 19. He was serving as duumvir for the second time.
- Marcus Suellius Maximus, a native of Ivanum, was a soldier in the Praetorian Guard in AD 144.
- Suellia Milevitana, named in a sepulchral inscription from Andematunum in Gallia Belgica.
- Lucius Suellius Ɔ. l. Nicomachus, buried at Corfinium in Sabinum in a tomb dedicated by Gaius Titacius Tertius, and dating to the late first century BC.
- Suellius Onesimus, buried at Rome, with a monument from the actor Hector.
- Marcus Suellius Perpetualis, named in an inscription commemorating the members of a guild at Ostia in AD 145.
- Gaius Suellius Pontianus, together with his cousin, Suellius Quartus, dedicated a tomb at the site of modern Qasr Manarah, formerly part of Africa Proconsularis, for Quartus' father, also named Suellius Quartus.
- Suellia L. l. Praesta, a freedwoman named in a sepulchral inscription from Rome, dating to the first half of the first century, along with Lucius Suellius Apollonius.
- Suellia Primigenia, along with her daughter, Suellia Festa, dedicated a first-century tomb at Uria for her husband, Gnaeus Suellius.
- Suellius Primus, dedicated a tomb for his wife, Crispia Amanda, aged seventy, at Ligures Baebiani, dating between AD 150 and 230.
- Marcus Suellius M. l. Primus, one of the freedmen of Marcus Suellius Cruscillio, named in an inscription from Ostia, dating from the first half of the first century.
- Suellia Prisca, dedicated a second- or third-century monument at Luceria in Apulia for her husband, Lucius Gavellius Felix.
- Suellia M. l. Psyche, a freedwoman, and the wife of Marcus Suellius Hermes, for whom she built a tomb at Ostia, dating from the latter half of the first century, or the first half of the second.
- Suellius Quartus, dedicated a tomb at the present site of El-Kley, formerly part of Africa Proconsularis, for his son, Marcus Suellius Quartus. He might be the same Suellius Quartus buried at modern Qasr Manarah, with a monument from his son, also named Suellius Quartus, and his cousin, Gaius Suellius Pontianus.
- Suellius Quartus, along with his cousin, Gaius Suellius Pontianus, dedicated a tomb at modern Qasr Manarah for his father, also named Suellius Quartus.
- Marcus Suellius Quartus, buried at the present site of El-Kley, aged thirty-six years, thirty days, with a monument from his father, Suellius Quartus.
- Suellius Rufus, named in an inscription commemorating one of the guilds at Portus in Latium.
- Suellius Rufus, together with Suellius Flaccus, possibly the legate of that name, was listed among the property owners at Ligures Baebiani in AD 101, with property valued at 109,000 sestertii.
- Gnaeus Suellius Cn. f. Rufus Marcianus, a youth from a senatorial family, listed among the heirs of Julia Valeria Marciana Crispinilla in an inscription from Puteoli in Campania, dating between AD 165 and 172. He was consul in an uncertain year between AD 184 and 192, and Legatus Augusti pro praetore of Thracia (Note: Erroneously given as Moesia Inferior in an inscription.) between AD 189 and 191. An inscription from Crete refers to him as proconsul. As curator of the temples and public works at Rome, he made a dedication to the Magna Mater on the sixth day before the Kalends of April (Note: March 27) in AD 192.
- Suellia Ɔ. l. Sabina, a freedwoman named in an inscription from Beneventum.
- Suellia Salvia, buried in a family sepulchre at Beneventum, dedicated by her husband, Sextus Suellius Dama[...].
- Suellius Saturninus, one of the duplicarii, or soldiers entitled to double pay, in the Legio III Augusta at Lambaesis in Numidia during the reign of Elagabalus.
- Marcus Suellius M. l. Saturus, a freedman named in an inscription from Rome.
- Suellius Secundinus, probably a freedman serving in the Vigiles, who participated in a military play in the role of stupidus, a fool, in AD 212.
- Marcus Suellius M. l. Secundus, one of the freedmen of Marcus Suellius Cruscillio, named in an inscription from Ostia, dating from the first half of the first century.
- Suellius Septiminus, dedicated a fourth-century sepulchre at Salona in Dalmatia for his wife, Desidiena Profutura, and son, also named Suellius Septiminus.
- Suellius Septiminus, buried at Salona, along with his mother, Desidiena Profutura, with a monument from his father, also named Suellius Septiminus.
- Marcus Suellius Sindaeus, named in a sepulchral inscription from Bovianum Undecimanorum in Samnium, dating between 27 BC and AD 50.
- Gnaeus Suellius Vitalio, a soldier in the century of Septimius Romulus, in the fifth cohort of the Vigiles at Rome in AD 205.
- Titus Suellius Vitalis, buried at Uchi Maius, where he had lived for sixteen years.
- Marcus Suellius M. l. Zeno, one of the freedmen of Marcus Suellius Cruscillio, named in an inscription from Ostia, dating from the first half of the first century.

== See also ==
- List of Roman gentes

== Bibliography ==
- Theodor Mommsen et alii, Corpus Inscriptionum Latinarum (The Body of Latin Inscriptions, abbreviated CIL), Berlin-Brandenburgische Akademie der Wissenschaften (1853–present).
- Gustav Wilmanns, Inscriptiones Africae Latinae (Latin Inscriptions from Africa, abbreviated ILAfr), Georg Reimer, Berlin (1881).
- René Cagnat et alii, L'Année épigraphique (The Year in Epigraphy, abbreviated AE), Presses Universitaires de France (1888–present).
- August Pauly, Georg Wissowa, et alii, Realencyclopädie der Classischen Altertumswissenschaft (Scientific Encyclopedia of the Knowledge of Classical Antiquities, abbreviated RE or PW), J. B. Metzler, Stuttgart (1894–1980).
- George Davis Chase, "The Origin of Roman Praenomina", in Harvard Studies in Classical Philology, vol. VIII, pp. 103–184 (1897).
- Paul von Rohden, Elimar Klebs, & Hermann Dessau, Prosopographia Imperii Romani (The Prosopography of the Roman Empire, abbreviated PIR), Berlin (1898).
- Friedrich Hild, Supplementum epigraphicum zu CIL III: das pannonische Niederösterreich, Burgenland und Wien 1902–1968 (Epigraphic Supplement to CIL III: Pannonian Lower Austria, Burgenland, and Vienna 1902–1968), Vienna (1968).
- La Carte Archéologique de la Gaule (Archaeological Map of Gaul, abbreviated CAG), Académie des Inscriptions et Belles-Lettres (1931–present).
- Emilio Magaldi, Rivista di Studi Pompeiani (Journal of Pompeian Studies, abbreviated RSP), Tipografia G. Torella & Figlio, Napoli (1934–present).
- John C. Traupman, The New College Latin & English Dictionary, Bantam Books, New York (1995).
