= Carmine Nardone =

Italian politician (born 1947)

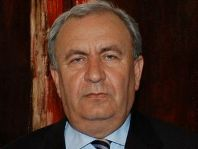

President of the Province of Benevento
- In office 24 May 1998 – 19 April 2008
- Preceded by: Roberto Russo
- Succeeded by: Aniello Cimitile

Member of the Chamber of Deputies
- In office 2 July 1987 – 14 April 1999

Personal details
- Born: 12 March 1947 (age 79) Benevento, Italy
- Party: Democratic Party

Carmine Nardone (born 12 March 1947) is an Italian politician who served as president of the Province of Benevento from 1998 to 2008 and as a member of the Chamber of Deputies from 1987 to 1999.
