= Claudio Ricci (politician) =

Italian politician (1958–2021)

President of the Province of Benevento
- In office 13 October 2014 – 1 November 2018
- Preceded by: Aniello Cimitile
- Succeeded by: Antonio Di Maria

Mayor of San Giorgio del Sannio
- In office 17 November 2011 – 20 June 2016
- Preceded by: Giorgio Carlo Nardone
- Succeeded by: Mario Pepe

Personal details
- Born: 8 June 1958 San Giorgio del Sannio, Province of Benevento, Italy
- Died: 10 April 2021 (aged 62) Benevento, Campania, Italy
- Party: DC (1988–1994); PPI (1994–2002); DL (2002–2007); PD (2007–2021)
- Education: University of Naples Federico II
- Profession: Lawyer

Claudio Ricci (8 June 1958 – 10 April 2021) was an Italian politician who served as president of the Province of Benevento from 2014 to 2018 and as mayor of San Giorgio del Sannio from 2011 to 2016.

== Life and career ==
Ricci was born in San Giorgio del Sannio, in the province of Benevento, on 8 June 1958. He graduated in law from the University of Naples Federico II and worked as a lawyer.

He was first elected to the municipal council of San Giorgio del Sannio in 1988 as a member of Christian Democracy (DC). He was continuously re-elected to the municipal council throughout his political career.

Following the dissolution of DC in 1994, he joined the Italian People's Party (PPI). He later became a member of The Daisy (La Margherita) and subsequently of the Democratic Party (PD). He served as municipal assessor from 1988 to 1993, deputy mayor from 2001 to 2006, and again as assessor from 2006 to 2011. In November 2011, Ricci was elected mayor of San Giorgio del Sannio.

He also served as a member of the Provincial Council of Benevento from 2006 to 2013, serving as the chair of the PD group.

In the 2014 provincial election, Ricci was elected president of the Province of Benevento, defeating centre-right candidate Giorgio Carlo Nista with 55.82% of the weighted vote (51,538 votes) to 44.18% (40,783 votes). He took office on 13 October 2014 and remained in office until 1 November 2018.

Ricci died from COVID-19 on 10 April 2021 at the age of 62.
