= Aniello Cimitile =

Italian politician and academic

President of the Province of Benevento
- In office 19 April 2008 – 20 April 2013
- Preceded by: Carmine Nardone
- Succeeded by: Claudio Ricci

Rector of the University of Sannio
- In office 2000–2006
- Preceded by: Pietro Perlingieri
- Succeeded by: Filippo Bencardino

Personal details
- Born: 3 January 1948 (age 78) Pomigliano d'Arco, Province of Naples, Italy
- Party: Democratic Party
- Education: University of Naples Federico II
- Occupation: Engineer, academic, politician

Aniello Cimitile (born 3 January 1948) is an Italian engineer, academic and politician who served as president of the Province of Benevento from 2008 to 2013 and as rector of the University of Sannio.

== Life and career ==
Cimitile was born in Pomigliano d'Arco on 3 January 1948. He graduated in electronic engineering from the University of Naples Federico II and became professor of software engineering at the University of Sannio. He later served as rector of the University of Sannio from 2000 to 2006 and of University of Rome Unitelma Sapienza from 2006 to 2012.

Cimitile joined the Democratic Party and was elected president of the Province of Benevento in 2008 as the candidate of a centre-left coalition. He won the election in the first round with 55.1% of the vote.

During his term as president, he led the provincial administration until the reform of Italian provinces introduced by the Delrio Law. His mandate expired in 2013, after which he was appointed extraordinary commissioner of the Province of Benevento, serving until October 2014.
