= Nino Lombardi =

Italian politician (born 1964)

President of the Province of Benevento
- Incumbent
- Assumed office 28 July 2022
- Preceded by: Antonio Di Maria

Mayor of Faicchio
- Incumbent
- Assumed office 26 May 2014
- Preceded by: Mario Borrelli

Personal details
- Born: 16 October 1964 (age 61) Faicchio, Province of Benevento, Italy
- Party: Us of the Centre
- Education: Link Campus University
- Occupation: Public executive

Nino Lombardi (born 16 October 1964) is an Italian politician who has served as president of the Province of Benevento since 2022. He was re-elected to the office in 2026.

== Life and career ==
Born in Faicchio in 1964, Lombardi worked as a public sector executive for local authorities in the Province of Benevento and for the Campania Regional Government. He later obtained a degree in law from Link Campus University in Rome.

He began his political career as a municipal councillor in Faicchio during the 1980s, initially representing Christian Democracy (DC). He later joined the Union of Democrats for Europe (UDEUR). From 2004 to 2009 he served as a municipal assessor.

In 2008 Lombardi was elected as a member of the Provincial Council of Benevento. On 26 May 2014, he was elected mayor of Faicchio, leading a centrist coalition. He was re-elected in 2019 and again in 2024.

In 2019 he was elected again to the Provincial Council. Following the corruption scandal involving president Antonio Di Maria, Lombardi became acting vice president of the Province of Benevento on 24 November 2021. He ran for president in the 2022 provincial election and was elected on 28 July 2022. Lombardi, supported by the centrist movement Us of the Centre led by Clemente Mastella, defeated centre-left candidate Antonio Calzone, receiving 60,061 weighted votes (72.6%) against Calzone's 22,631 votes (27.4%).

In the 2026 provincial election, held on 26 July 2026, Lombardi was re-elected as president, once again supported by Us of the Centre and centrist local majority. He defeated centre-right candidate Claudio Cataudo, receiving 56,821 weighted votes (64.9%) against Cataudo's 30,939 votes (35.1%).
