= Circello =

- Comune
- Comune di Circello

- Coat of arms

- Location within Italy Location within Campania
- Coordinates: 41°21′N 14°49′E
- Country: Italy
- Region: Campania
- Province: Benevento (BN)

Government
  - Mayor: Gianclaudio Golia

Area
  - Total: 45.66 km^{2} (17.63 sq mi)
- Elevation: 700 m (2,300 ft)

Population (1 January 2020)
  - Total: 2,270
  - Density: 49.7/km^{2} (129/sq mi)
- Demonym: Circellesi
- Time zone: UTC+1 (CET)
  - Summer (DST): UTC+2 (CEST)
- Postal code: 82020
- Dialing code: 0824
- ISTAT code: 062024
- Patron saint: Saint Michael Archangel
- Website: Official website

Circello (Beneventan: Ciorceglio) is a comune (municipality) in the Province of Benevento in the Italian region Campania, located about 70 kilometres (43 mi) northeast of Naples and about 25 km (16 mi) north of Benevento and approximately 700 metres (2,300 ft) above sea level.

Circello borders the following municipalities: Campolattaro, Castelpagano, Colle Sannita, Fragneto l'Abate, Morcone, Reino, Santa Croce del Sannio.

== Geography ==
=== Climate ===
Circello has an mountainous climate with cold and snowy winters, sometimes exceeding 1 m of snow precipitation. Snowstorms are quite common during winter (with snow sometimes present for 30 days or more), while the summers are mild with temperatures that rarely exceed 35 degrees Celsius. The lowest temperature recorded in Circello was on 2 December 1985, at -21 degrees Celsius. Other low temperatures were -13 degrees Celsius in January 2003, and -15 degrees Celsius in December 2010. The highest temperature recorded was in August 2007, at 36 degrees Celsius.

== History ==
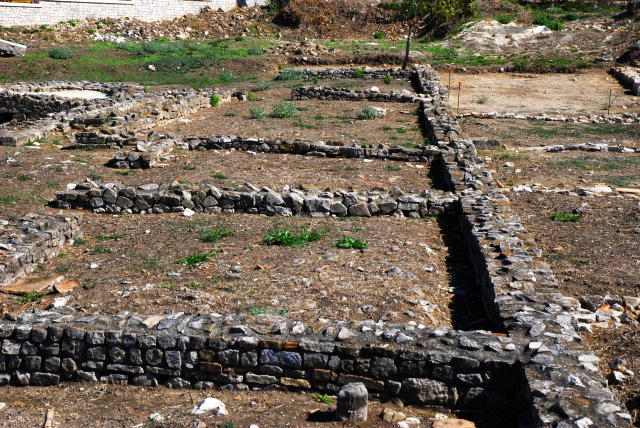
Macchia archeological area

Circello is a small rural center situated within the Province of Benevento. It sits upon a rocky outcropping between the vallies of the Torti and Tammarecchia rivers. In ancient times, Circello was a Samnite city. This zone, according to Titus Livius, was called "Taurasia". The territories of Upper Samnium were conquered by the Romans following the Samnite Wars, and the area around Circello became Ager publicus, that is public land belonging to the Roman people. Excavations in the area, in particular in the Macchia district, demonstrate the Roman presence in Circello.

Just a few kilometers from the center of Circello, there is an archaeological site at what was once the capital of Ligures Baebiani, a population of Ligurians who were deported from their homeland in 181 BC under the orders of the Roman consul Marcus Baebius Tamphilus, from whom (following Roman custom) they took the name Baebiani.

In 1831, the Tabula Alimentaria Ligurum Baebianorum was found in the Macchia district of Circello; it is an artifact dating from the year 101 AD, which lists the names of local landowners who had committed to investing in a fund for needy children that was established by the emperor Trajan. According to the tablet, the interest rate was set at 2.5%. The tablet was found in 1831 by Giosuè De Agostini at his own farm, and it was transcribed for the first time in 1845 by Raffaele Garrucci. Today, it can be seen at the Museo Nazionale Romano in Rome.

A castle was built here by the Normans in the 11th century. A tower was added in the 14th century under the Aragonese.

== Main sights ==
- The Castle and Ducal palace
- Chiesa dell'Annunziata
- San Nicola
- San Francesco
- San Rocco
- Torre di Sant'Angelo
- Ruins of the city of Ligures Baebiani in contrada Macchia

== People ==
- Antonio Ricci (1950), Italian author and television producer
- Loretta Goggi (1950), Italian singer, actress, television hostess, showgirl, imitator
