= Suillia gens =

Ancient Roman family

The gens Suillia, occasionally written Suilia, was a minor plebeian family at ancient Rome. Members of this gens are first mentioned under the early Empire. The first of the Suillii to obtain the consulship was Publius Suillius Rufus, early in the reign of Claudius.

== Origin ==
The nomen Suillius appears to belong to a class of gentilicia typically formed from cognomina with diminutive endings, such as -ulus, or the double diminutive -illus, but occasionally formed directly from surnames without these endings. Plutarch derives the name from suillus, a Latin adjective relating to swine, which he notes were, along with other livestock, among the principal measures of value in early Rome. The nomen is easily confused with that of the Suellia gens, with which it might perhaps be identical. Like the Suillii, the Suellii used the cognomen Rufus, although that surname was abundant enough to arise by chance in unrelated families. However, while the epigraphy of the Suellia gens places their origin firmly in Samnium, none of the Suillii are found in that region, although several inscriptions of this gens are from other parts of Italy, including Etruria and Campania.

== Praenomina ==
The main praenomina of the Suillia gens were Publius and Marcus, both among the most common names at all periods of Roman history. In inscriptions we also find Manius, Gaius, Lucius, and Titus.

== Branches and cognomina ==
Only one distinct branch of this family occurs in history, consisting of the descendants of Publius Suillius Rufus, whose surname belongs to a common type of cognomen derived from the physical features of individuals, and originally designating someone with red hair. It is not clear whether this surname was inherited from earlier generations, or passed down to his descendants, as his sons bore the surnames Caesoninus and Nerullinus, presumably alluding to their maternal forebears; however, there appears to have been a Suillius Rufus among the African colonials of this gens, though there is no evidence to show whether he was a descendant of the same stirps, or merely shared a ubiquitous surname.

== Members ==
This list includes abbreviated praenomina. For an explanation of this practice, see filiation.

=== Suillii Rufi ===
- Publius Suillius Rufus, the half-brother of Gnaeus Domitius Corbulo, was the quaestor of Germanicus, but banished by Tiberius for accepting bribes while a judex. Recalled by Claudius, he became a trusted advisor to the emperor, and was consul in AD 41; but he wasted his talents and was too easily influenced by money, and was banished again by Nero. Suillius was a son-in-law of the poet Ovid.
- (Publius) Suillius P. f. Caesoninus, accused of complicity in the scandalous marriage of Gaius Silius and the empress Messalina, was spared execution on the grounds that "his part had been the reverse of masculine". (Note: As translated by John Jackson, for the Loeb Classical Library. Here Tacitus implies that Caesoninus had taken a passive homosexual role, which Claudius regarded as sufficiently degrading to spare the young man's life.)
- Marcus Suillius P. f. Nerullinus, consul in AD 50, was spared punishment when his father was banished by Nero, and was proconsul of Asia at the beginning of the reign of Vespasian.
- Publius Suillius (P. f.) Rufus, hypothesized to be a third son of Rufus, and the brother of Caesoninus and Nerullinus, may instead be the same person as Rufus.
- Suillia, daughter of the consul Nerullinus
- Marcus Suillius (M. f. P. n.) Nerullinus, named on a coin from Hierapolis in Asia, is perhaps the Nerullinus known to Athenagoras, in which case he may have been the son of the consul Nerullinus, and governor of Asia under the Antonines.

=== Others ===
- Suillius, named in an inscription from Vasio in Gallia Narbonensis.
- Suillius, named in a pottery inscription from Noviomagus Batavorum in Germania Inferior.
- Marcus Suillius M. f., named in a sepulchral inscription from Spoletium in Umbria.
- Publius Suillius P. (f?), named in an inscription from Mediolanum in Gallia Lugdunensis, mentioning Gaius Prastina Placatus, the provincial governor at some point in the reign of Antoninus Pius.
- Titus Suillius Albanus, a native of Nicaea, and veteran of twenty-five years' service, was buried at Misenum in Campania, in his fifties, in a tomb dating from the middle or late second century, dedicated by Antonius Quadratus, Aemilius Quadratus, and his freedwoman, Suillia Eugenia.
- Publius Suillius Celer, one of the curatores of the tribus Suburana in AD 70.
- Manius Suillius M'. f. Celsus, a scriba at Rome, and the former master of Manius Suillius Philodamus.
- Publius Suillius Cerylus, buried at Pisae in Etruria, aged fifty-three.
- Suillia T. l. Eugenia, freedwoman of Titus Suillius Albanus, for whom she joined Antonius Quadratus and Aemilius Quadratus in dedicating a second-century tomb at Misenum.
- Suillia Firmina, dedicated a monument at Scupi in Moesia Superior, dating to the first half of the second century, to her husband, Marcus Ulpius Julius Augustalis, aged seventy-six.
- Suillia Firmina, buried in a family sepulchre at Municipium Turcetanum in Africa Proconsularis, aged twenty-five, along with her father-in-law, Lucius Licinius Felix Egnatianus, aged sixty-nine, and son, Lucius Licinius Victorinus Ampelianus, aged seven.
- Suillius Genialis, the infant son of Rufus, buried at Thysdrus in Africa Proconsularis, aged one year, seven months, and twelve days.
- Suillia Halina, one of the daughters of Valeria Successa, the wife of Lucius Valerius Halys, buried in a first-century tomb at Rome, with a monument from her husband and children.
- Publius Suillius Halo, one of the sons of Valeria Successa, the wife of Lucius Valerius Halys, buried in a first-century tomb at Rome, with a monument from her husband and children.
- Publius Suillius Philadelphus, one of the sons of Valeria Successa, the wife of Lucius Valerius Halys, buried in a first-century tomb at Rome, with a monument from her husband and children.
- Quintus Suillius Philargurus, named in a pottery inscription from Abellinum in Campania.
- Manius Suillius M'. l. Philodamus, freedman of the scriba Manius Suillius Celsus, named in an inscription from Rome.
- Suillia Priscilla, buried at Rome, in a tomb dedicated by Rubrius.
- Suillius Saturninus, dioichetes of Egypt in AD 194.
- Suillia Secunda, buried at Rusellae in Etruria, aged twelve, with a monument from her parents, Suillius Secundus and Nemusa, dating to the second or early third century.
- Suillius Secundus, together with his wife, Nemusa, dedicated a second- or early third-century tomb at Rusellae for their daughter, Suillia Secunda.
- Lucius Suillius C. f. Tiro, buried at Ateste in Venetia and Histria.

== See also ==
- List of Roman gentes

== Bibliography ==
- Publius Ovidius Naso (Ovid), Epistulae ex Ponto (Letters from Pontus).
- Gaius Plinius Secundus (Pliny the Elder), Historia Naturalis (Natural History).
- Publius Cornelius Tacitus, Annales.
- Lucius Mestrius Plutarchus (Plutarch), Lives of the Noble Greeks and Romans; Moralia, including "Quaestiones Romanae" ("Roman Questions").
- Athenagoras of Athens, Apologia.
- Joseph Hilarius Eckhel, Doctrina Numorum Veterum (The Study of Ancient Coins, 1792–1798).
- Dictionary of Greek and Roman Biography and Mythology, William Smith, ed., Little, Brown and Company, Boston (1849).
- Theodor Mommsen et alii, Corpus Inscriptionum Latinarum (The Body of Latin Inscriptions, abbreviated CIL), Berlin-Brandenburgische Akademie der Wissenschaften (1853–present).
- René Cagnat et alii, L'Année épigraphique (The Year in Epigraphy, abbreviated AE), Presses Universitaires de France (1888–present).
- August Pauly, Georg Wissowa, et alii, Realencyclopädie der Classischen Altertumswissenschaft (Scientific Encyclopedia of the Knowledge of Classical Antiquities, abbreviated PW), J. B. Metzler, Stuttgart (1894–1980).
- George Davis Chase, "The Origin of Roman Praenomina", in Harvard Studies in Classical Philology, vol. VIII, pp. 103–184 (1897).
- Paul von Rohden, Elimar Klebs, & Hermann Dessau, Prosopographia Imperii Romani (The Prosopography of the Roman Empire, abbreviated PIR), Berlin (1898).
- E. Labruna, Storia sociale dell'Hirpinia in età imperiale (The Story of Hirpinia in the Imperial Age), (2013).
