= San Nicola, Circello =

Church building in Circello, Italy

San Nicola is a Romanesque-style, Roman Catholic church located on Largo San Nicola in the town of Circello, Province of Benevento, region of Campania, Italy. It is the oldest extant church building in Circello.

== History ==
The Church has undergone many restorations and reconstructions over the centuries. Next to the church is the old cemetery called la Lopa di San Nicola. The church has a bas relief of the Glory of St. Nicholas made of stone and stucco and stucco dating back to the 7th or 8th-centuries. The church is situated in a little square that once used to be the heart of the village.
