= Castelpagano =

- Comune
- Comune di Castelpagano
- Location within Italy Location within Campania
- Coordinates: 41°24′N 14°48′E
- Country: Italy
- Region: Campania
- Province: Benevento (BN)

Government
  - Mayor: Michele Bozzuto

Area
  - Total: 38.26 km^{2} (14.77 sq mi)
- Elevation: 630 m (2,070 ft)

Population (1 January 2020)
  - Total: 1,394
  - Density: 36.43/km^{2} (94.37/sq mi)
- Demonym: Castelpaganesi
- Time zone: UTC+1 (CET)
  - Summer (DST): UTC+2 (CEST)
- Postal code: 82020
- Dialing code: 0824
- ISTAT code: 062017
- Patron saint: The Holiest Saviour; Donatus of Arezzo
- Saint day: 6 August; 7 August
- Website: Official website

Castelpagano (Beneventan: Castiello ro Paiane) is a comune (municipality) in the Province of Benevento in the Italian region Campania, located about 80 km (50 mi) northeast of Naples and about 30 km (19 mi) north of Benevento.

Castelpagano borders the following municipalities: Cercemaggiore, Circello, Colle Sannita, Riccia, Santa Croce del Sannio.
