= List of presidents of the Province of Benevento =

President of the Province of Benevento
- Presidente della Provincia di Benevento
- Incumbent; Nino Lombardi since 4 August 2022
- Term length: 4 years
- Inaugural holder: Cosimo Martini
- Formation: 1889

The president of the Province of Benevento is the head of the provincial government in Benevento, Campania, Italy. The president oversees the administration of the province, coordinates the activities of the municipalities, and represents the province in regional and national matters.

Since August 2022, the office has been held by Nino Lombardi of the Us of the Centre.

== List ==
=== Presidents of the Provincial Deputation (1890–1924) ===
No.	Portrait	Name	Term of office		Party
No.	Portrait	Name	Start	End	Party
1		Cosimo Martini	11 August 1890	1 March 1903	
2		Giovan Battista Bosco Lucarelli, Sr.	2 March 1903	7 August 1910	
3		Almerico Meomartini	8 August 1910	9 February 1923	

=== Presidents of the Royal Commission (1923–1929) ===
No.	Portrait	Name	Term of office		Party
No.	Portrait	Name	Start	End	Party
–		Francesco Cupido	10 February 1923	8 April 1923	National Fascist Party
1		Francesco Cupido	9 April 1923	9 April 1924	National Fascist Party
2		Romualdo Pintor Mameli	10 April 1924	25 March 1925	National Fascist Party
3		Michele Chiaramonti	26 March 1925	16 September 1925	National Fascist Party
4		Mauro Di Sanza	17 September 1925	30 November 1926	National Fascist Party
–		Mauro Di Sanza	1 December 1926	4 January 1927	National Fascist Party
–		Giuseppe Meta	5 January 1927	24 January 1927	Prefectural commissioner
–		Edoardo Tomaiuoli	25 January 1927	26 April 1929	Prefectural commissioner

=== Presidents of the Provincial Rectorate (1929–1943) ===
No.	Portrait	Name	Term of office		Party
No.	Portrait	Name	Start	End	Party
1		Vincenzo Di Somma	7 April 1929	13 November 1932	National Fascist Party
2		Giuseppe Di Salvo	14 November 1932	10 January 1934	National Fascist Party
3		Gaetano Napoletano	11 January 1934	29 April 1938	National Fascist Party
4		Ferdinando Rosati de Girolamo Grosso	30 April 1938	16 December 1938	National Fascist Party
—		Pasquale Meomartini	17 December 1938	4 August 1939	National Fascist Party
5		Pasquale Meomartini	5 August 1939	20 October 1943	National Fascist Party

=== Presidents of the Provincial Deputation (1943–1952) ===
No.	Portrait	Name	Term of office		Party
No.	Portrait	Name	Start	End	Party
—		Alberto Perrelli	21 October 1943	19 May 1944	Prefectural commissioner
1		Giambattista Bosco Lucarelli, Jr.	20 May 1944	6 February 1948	Christian Democracy
2		Giuseppe Iannella	7 February 1948	11 July 1952	

=== Presidents of the Province (1952–present) ===
No.	Portrait	Name	Term of office		Party
No.	Portrait	Name	Start	End	Party
1		Alessandro Lombardi	12 July 1952	26 November 1956	
2		Pasquale Saponaro	27 November 1956	26 June 1968	
–		Aldo Cucinelli (acting)	27 June 1968	16 September 1968	Italian Socialist Party
3		Francesco Gagliardi	16 September 1968	14 February 1977	
4		Tullio Iannotti	15 February 1977	17 November 1980	
5		Tommaso Lombardi	18 November 1980	4 March 1982	
6		Luigi Maria Tedeschi	4 March 1982	19 March 1986	Christian Democracy
–		Enrico Bozzi (Prefectural commissioner)	20 March 1986	22 May 1986	—
(6)		Luigi Maria Tedeschi	23 May 1986	25 July 1990	Christian Democracy
7		Floriano Panza	26 July 1990	23 March 1994	Christian Democracy
8		Mario Serino	24 March 1994	6 May 1995	Christian Democracy
9		Roberto Russo	10 May 1995	20 July 1998	Forza Italia
–		Donato Guarino (acting)	4 August 1998	3 December 1998	Independent (centre-right)
10		Carmine Nardone	4 December 1998	29 May 2003	Democrats of the Left
10		Carmine Nardone	29 May 2003	19 April 2008	Democrats of the Left
11		Aniello Cimitile	19 April 2008	20 April 2013	Independent (centre-left)
–		Aniello Cimitile	20 April 2013	13 October 2014	Independent (centre-left)
12		Claudio Ricci	13 October 2014	1 November 2018	Democratic Party
13		Antonio Di Maria	1 November 2018	24 November 2021	Independent (centre-right)
–		Nino Lombardi	24 November 2021	4 August 2022	Us of the Centre
14		Nino Lombardi	4 August 2022	27 July 2026	Us of the Centre
14		Nino Lombardi	27 July 2026	Incumbent	Us of the Centre

== Sources ==
- "Storia amministrativa dell'ente". Ministero dell'Interno.
- Menichini, Piera (2005). "I presidenti delle Province dall'Unità alla Grande guerra: repertorio analitico". Storia Amministrazione Costituzione (13): 229–230.
