= San Rocco, Circello =

Church building in Circello, Italy

San Rocco is a Roman Catholic church in Circello, Province of Benevento, region of Campania, Italy.

== History ==
In 1500 (526 years ago), a small chapel was built on the site, a hill above the town; over the centuries it was expanded into a small stone church. In 1691 it was granted the title of Sacred Mount of the Dead. The bell-tower dates to 1877. The most recent restorations date to 1983–1984. The altar has polychrome marble decoration from 18th-century and a tabernacle with a Madonna Addolorata.
