= Ligures Baebiani =

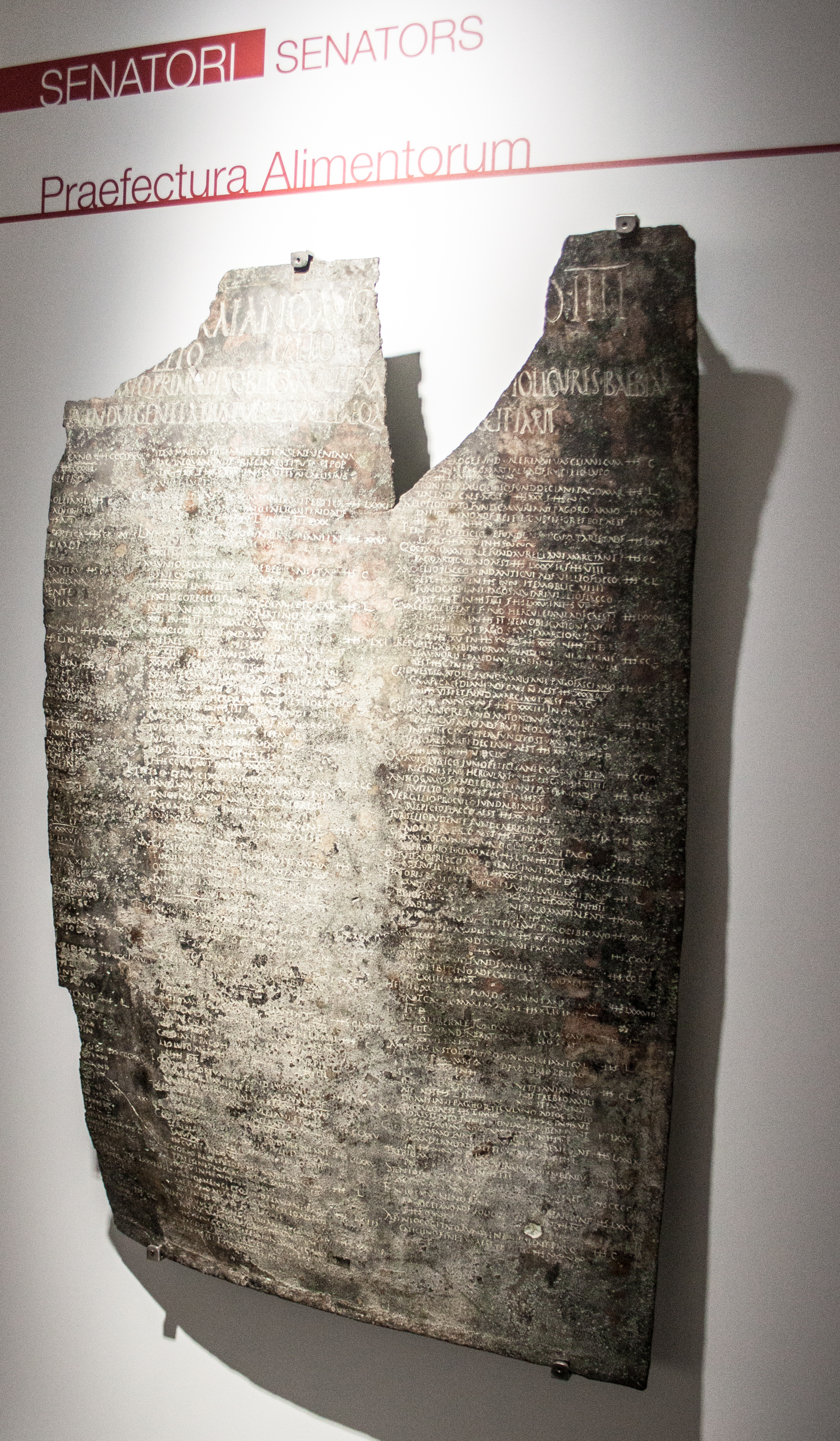
The Tabula of Ligures Baebiani in the Museo Nazionale Romano

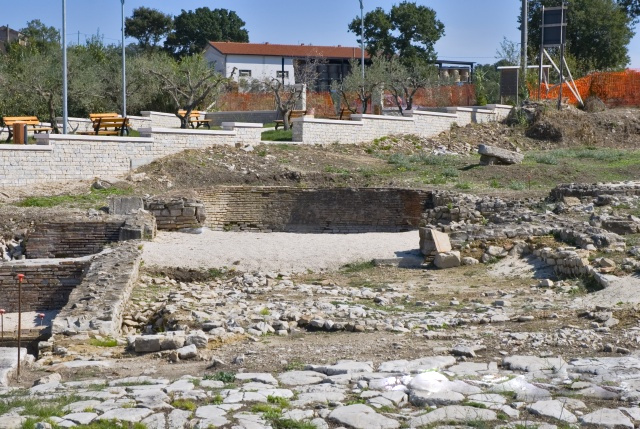
The archaeological area in the Macchia district of Circello

In ancient geography, the Ligures Baebiani were a settlement of Ligurians in Samnium, Italy.

== History ==
The towns of Taurasia (not to be confused with modern Taurasi) and Cisauna in Samnium had been captured in 298 BC by the consul L. Cornelius Scipio Barbatus, and the territory of the former remained Roman state domain (ager publicus). In 180 BC, 47,000 Ligurians, the Ligures Apuani, a people repeatedly noted by Livy as the most formidable of the Ligurian tribes who controlled the region from the coastal neighborhoods of Luna to Tuscany's Apuan Alps and Apennine mountains, including women and children, were forcibly deported to this district in southern Italy. Two settlements were formed, the Ligures Baebiani and the Ligures Corneliani, taking their names from the consuls of 181 BC who oversaw their deportation, M. Baebius Tamphilus and P. Cornelius Cethegus.

== Location and archaeology ==
The site of the former town lies 15 miles north of Beneventum in the Macchia district of the municipality of modern Circello, on the road leading from Saepinum and Aequum Tuticum. In its ruins several inscriptions have been found, notably a large bronze tablet discovered in a public building in the Forum bearing the date AD 101, and relating to the alimentary institution founded by Trajan here (see Veleia). A sum of money was lent to landed proprietors of the district (whose names and estates are specified in the inscription), and the interest which it produced formed the income of the institution, which, on the model of that of Veleia, would have served to support a little over one hundred children. The capital was 401,800 sesterces, and the annual interest probably at 5%, i.e. 20,090 sesterces. The site of the other settlement, that of the Ligures Corneliani is unknown.
