= Santa Croce del Sannio =

- Comune
- Comune di Santa Croce del Sannio
- Coat of arms

- Location within Italy Location within Campania
- Coordinates: 41°23′N 14°43′E
- Country: Italy
- Region: Campania
- Province: Benevento (BN)

Government
  - Mayor: Antonio Zeoli

Area
  - Total: 16.3 km^{2} (6.3 sq mi)
- Elevation: 689 m (2,260 ft)

Population (31 December 2015)
  - Total: 927
  - Density: 56.9/km^{2} (147/sq mi)
- Demonym: Santacrocesi
- Time zone: UTC+1 (CET)
  - Summer (DST): UTC+2 (CEST)
- Postal code: 82020
- Dialing code: 0824
- ISTAT code: 062069
- Patron saint: Saint Sebastian
- Website: Official website

Santa Croce del Sannio is a comune (municipality) in the Province of Benevento in the Italian region Campania, located about 70 kilometres (43 mi) northeast of Naples and about 30 kilometres (19 mi) north of Benevento.

Santa Croce del Sannio borders the municipalities of Castelpagano, Cercemaggiore, Circello and Morcone.

Comune photos
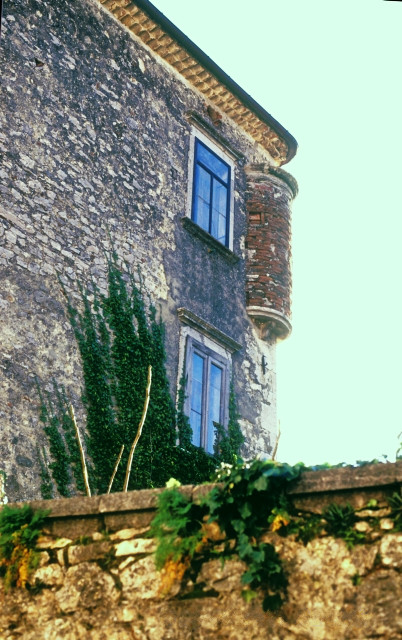
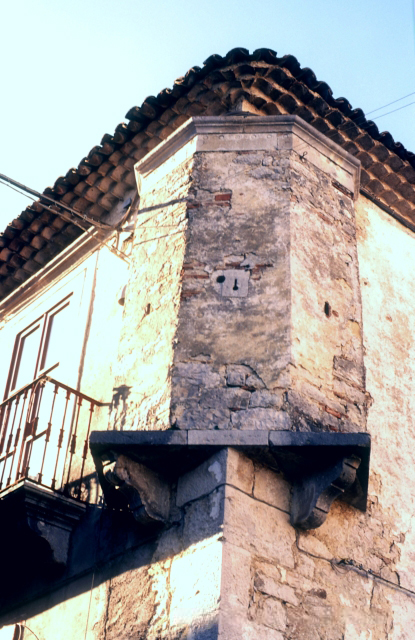
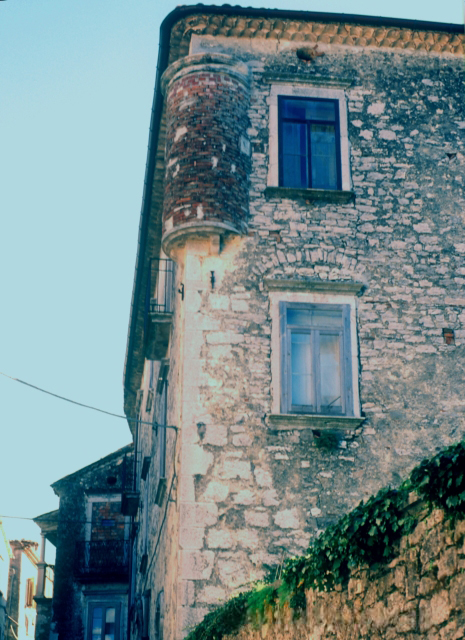

== Etymology ==
Santa Croce del Sannio's name derives from the Franciscan name assigned 'Santa Croce' (English: Holy Cross) which remained as the municipality's name until the added suffix 'Di Morcone' was added under the Kingdom of Two Sicilies. The suffix was changed to 'del Sannio' (English: 'Of the Samnites') in 1883 - referring to the municipality's history and geographical location.

== History ==
=== Samnite Era (4th–3rd centuries BC) ===
During the Samnite era (4th–3rd centuries BC), the area was organized according to the paganico-vicano (English: 'pagan-vican') settlement system of scattered rural villages and farmsteads.

During the Samnite Wars (343–290 BC), Roman forces attacked and destroyed several settlements in Samnium, forcing survivors to retreat to fortified hilltop sites. As a result of these wars the Roman Republic was able to snatch up the surrounding land. Including the (modern) land of Santa Croce del Sannio.

=== Roman Era ===
Following the Samnite period, a widespread settlement developed, following the Pagan-Vican system, which consolidated during the Romanization of the Samnite Apennines.

During the Roman Era the area was recorded in the itinerarium Antonini (in 161AD) as the 'statio super tamari fluvium' (English: station on the Tammaro River) which was in reference to the area's geographic position. It functioned as a stopover and resting place for travelers along the Via Minucia. It operated from 30 BC – AD 300.

The Romans exploited the region’s transhumance routes, formalizing seasonal movement of animal flocks along paths such as the Regio Tratturo Pescasseroli–Candela. Livestock quickly became a major export and aspect of local commerce for the area.

The land that became Santa Croce del Sannio started to be known as 'Casale Sanctae Crucis' (English: 'Hamlet of the Holy Cross'), during this era, becoming a small Hamlet.

=== 8th Century ===
Monks of this era (exact year contested) gave the hamlet its name, 'Santa Croce' (until 1883) with the name deriving from the local church that was dedicated to the Holy Cross.

In 762, King Desiderius, the last Lombard king, assigns the possession of the town to the Abbot Theodemario of the Abbey of Montecassino.

=== 9th Century ===
At the time of the Saracen invasions, in the 9th century, the hamlet of Santa Croce was mysteriously spared from plundering; history does not explain the reason. This mysterious event gave birth to the 'La Pace' tale (although it wouldn't be performed until 1785).

=== 11th Century ===
In the year 1000, Santa Croce became a hamlet of the Cassinesi. The hamlet also became the origin location of the Santacroce family, which became very powerful under the Angevins.

=== Angevin Period (12th-13th Century) ===
William I “the bad” of Sicily took the land from the Cassinesi and donated it to Rodolfo Alemagno who owned it from 1172 to 1183. During this time Santa Croce had the differentiating suffix 'di Morcone' added to avoid confusion with another Santa Croce, called Magliano.

In a land registry ordered by Frederick II in 1239, the description of the territory of Santa Croce has listed a "Colle di San Giovanni." (English: Hill of Saint John).

In 1245 the Church of the Holy Cross (which the land was named after) was rebuilt by the Franciscans.

Subsequently, in 1277, the estate came under the ownership of William of Santa Croce. Later, under Charles II of Anjou, it was transferred to Manfredi of Santa Croce, who eventually sold it to Siginulfo, Count of Telese.

The two clusters of dwellings (the casalia hominum recorded in the monastic cartularies) that can be identified in the building fabric of Vicoli Tiglio and Via Dianella were progressively incorporated into the Norman castrum, which included the cluster of houses located downstream from the castle. The first of the two farmhouses, along with the surrounding building growth, was enclosed within a wall that reached as far as the current Palazzo Giovine in the early 12th century.

As the period continued, the population increased further, with the need for a further neighbourhood coming into fruition. It was formed based on a modular subdivision. Under these circumstances, the castle became a feudal residence, albeit temporarily, with the construction of the commune's tower.

=== Aragonese (15th-16th Century) ===
In 1456 Ferdinand I of Aragon gave this fiefdom as remuneration to his captain of arms Giovan Battista del Balzo. This same year in December the town was destroyed during the 1456 Central Italy earthquakes.

In 1532, there were 60 households, in 1545 there were 72, in 1561 there were 75, in 1595 146, in 1648 it was taxed for 120 households and in 1669 for 240.

The Chiesa Madre di Santa Maria Assunta was created in 1536. It was created using local limestone which were sourced by devoted farmers. It was built at the top of a hill in the very centre of the oldest part of the village. The construction was carried out using traditional local medieval techniques.

From 1561 the Santa Croce population was increased significantly by the immigration of families from the nearby Cercemaggiore, hit by an epidemic of plague. Later, the fiefdom passed to the family of Sorrento Tramontano.

=== 17th Century ===
In October 1656 to March 1657 a terrible plague broke out with the chapel becoming important in suppressing the spread of infection. Inside the church it is still possible to read the epigraph that reads “In tempore pestis 1656”. The inhabitants of the small village turned to San Giovanni for intercession and to ask for protection. Hailed as a "Miracle", despite the dramatic circumstances of the epidemic, the population of Santa Croce increased, tripling the commune's population prior to the plague since immigration from Cercemaggiore continued. By 1669, the number of taxable households had risen to 240 (from 72 in 1545), doubling the tax burden. Overall the plague killed around 600 people, including clergy members and the archpriest Don Libero Antonio Marino, except for two clerics who were away at the Seminary of Benevento.

As a result of the 1688 Sannio earthquakes the Chiesa Madre di Santa Maria Assunta was destroyed.

In 1690 the archbishop of Benevento, Cardinal Pietro Orsini (later Pope Benedict XIII), went on a pastoral visit to the village for the first time and found the Chapel of San Giovanni in a "truly precarious condition". It was for this reason that he ordered its restoration which was carried out until 1710 when the chapel was consecrated to the venerated saint.

=== 18th Century ===
The century saw many religious reforms in the area of Santa Croce di Morcone due to Cardinal Orsini. In 1709, Archbishop Orsini ordered that the Chiesa Sant’Antonio and the adjacent convent be ceded to the observant Franciscan friars from the nearby province of Foggia. On June 24, 1710, the feast day of Saint John the Baptist, the Chiesa Madre di Santa Maria Assunta was now restored, and was consecrated by Cardinal Orsini. In 1711, work began on expanding the convents surrounding the Chiesa Sant’Antonio, which, among other modifications, included the construction of the left and rear sides. They were completed in 1725 and two years later the Franciscan community of Santa Croce achieved full autonomy.

In 1785 the festival 'La Pace' began after an epitaph was built in 1786 that reports the text of the decree of King Ferdinand IV, establishing the weekly livestock market in Santa Croce di Morcone. The festival has been held annually since, excluding 1944 due to the Second World War.

=== 19th Century ===
Following a revolt in 1802 from the townsfolk, the last heir of the Tramontano family lost his control of the fiefdom with the town declaring themselves a "libera Università" (English: 'Free University') - which made the town self-governing and removed feudal obligations.

Following the Kingdom of Naples' law no. 132 of 8 August 1806 the libera Università became a municipality and the College of Decurions was established. With the subsequent law no. 14 on 19 January 1807 the municipality of Santa Croce was ascribed to the government of Morcone of the province of Molise. With decree no. 922 of 4 May 1811 Santa Croce was included in the district of Sepino of the district of Campobasso.

After the Risorgimento had swept through the Kingdom of the Two Sicilies and brought it under the Kingdom of Italy, the municipality was passed to the province of Benevento (under lieutenant decree n. 260 of 17 February 1861) just after Benevento had been itself elevated to the status of province on October 25, 1860.

Royal Decree n. 1210 of 8 February 1883 changed the name of the municipality from its original 'Santa Croce di Morcone' to the modern 'Santa Croce del Sannio', in reference to its geographical and historical location under the Samnites.

=== 20th Century ===
By the early 20th Century many residents from Santa Croce del Sannio would emigrate abroad to places like Rhode Island where a few documented Santacrocesi moved.

Following the rise of Fascism within Italy, the famed scholar, Girolamo Vitelli in writing to a friend remarked: "It is the nobility of the aims of Fascismo which enabled it to sweep away in a few days the whole organization of graft, parasitism and incompetence, which for decades had been sucking the life-blood of the country and exploiting the hard-working honest people, who only asked to be allowed to conduct their own business in their own way and look after their homes, their fields, and their families" which came as a result of Girolamo's friend informing him that the town had created a fascist section.

== Geography ==
Santa Croce del Sannio is located in the upper Tammaro valley at 689m above sea level, in the Campanian Apennines. The municipal territory is crossed by an ancient transhumance route, the Pescasseroli-Candela sheep track.

== Governance ==
Since 1993 has the municipality has held direct elections for mayor, introduced under Law no. 81 on 25 March 1993.

The current serving mayor is Antonio Zeoli.

== Demographics ==
=== Population ===
First recorded on 31 December 1861 (after the municipality's formation and Risorgimento), the total population was recorded as 4,161 people with this number increasing by 1.8% to 4,237 people in 1871. Following the next census this number decreased by -0.8% to 4,201 people. A steady increase occurred as it went through 1901 and 1911's censuses with it recorded in 1901 that 4,389 (+4.5%) people now resided in the municipality, in 1911 it increased to 4,863 (+10.8%). Proceeding the First World War and Spanish Flu the population fell -6.0% to 4,571. By 1931 this number had sharply declined by 40.3% to 2,728. In 1936 the number continued to stifle down to 2,500 (-8.3%). Proceeding the Second World War in 1951 the population had decreased by 16.6% to 2,084. 1961 it fell by another 15.7% to 1,756 people. 1971 it again fell by 25% to 1,317 people. 1981 down by another 7.7% to 1,216. 1991 down by 4.4% to 1,166. 2001 down by 8.5% to 1,067. With the first online Italian census in 2011 it continued to dwindle by 7.7% to 985. 2021 it was reported that 858 still reside in the municipality which was down 12.9%.

Historical population
Year	Pop.	±% p.a.
1861	4,161	—
1871	4,237	+0.18%
1881	4,201	−0.09%
1901	4,389	+0.22%
1911	4,863	+1.03%
1921	4,571	−0.62%
1931	2,728	−5.03%
1936	2,500	−1.73%
1951	2,084	−1.21%
1961	1,756	−1.70%
1971	1,317	−2.84%
1981	1,216	−0.79%
1991	1,166	−0.42%
2001	1,067	−0.88%
2011	985	−0.80%
2021	858	−1.37%
Source: ISTAT

== Culture ==
=== Festivals ===
==== La Pace ====
===== History =====
Annually the commune celebrates with a festival called 'La Pace' (English: 'The Peace'). It tells of a fictional peace between the Christians and the Saracens which was inspired by the town being spared during the Saracen Invasions of the 9th Century. It has been held annually on Shrove Tuesday since 1785.

===== Story =====
The staged story sees the fictitious Christian Duke of Santa Croce organise a tournament involving the knights of his fiefdom, with the aim of finding a husband for his daughter Maribella. The Saracens camped in the nearby countryside are excluded from the tournament, which angers the chieftain Seudan, who challenges the Duke to a duel. The dramatic turn of events comes with the intervention of Maribella, who agrees to marry Seudan on the condition that he convert to Christianity. Moved by this gesture, Seudan throws down his sword and converts to marry the girl. Thus was born 'La Pace', from which the event takes its name.

Typical demonstration of 'La Pace', 2 March 1976
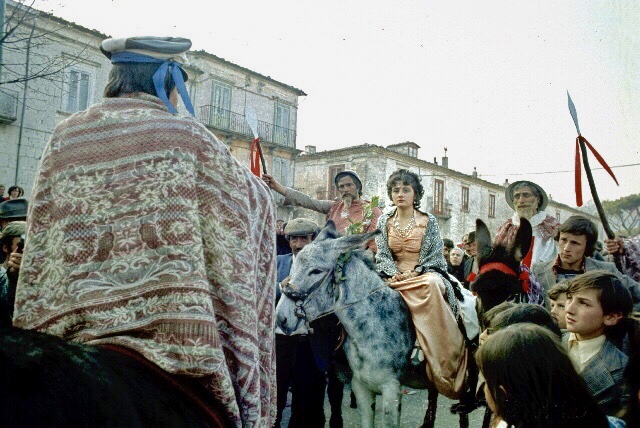
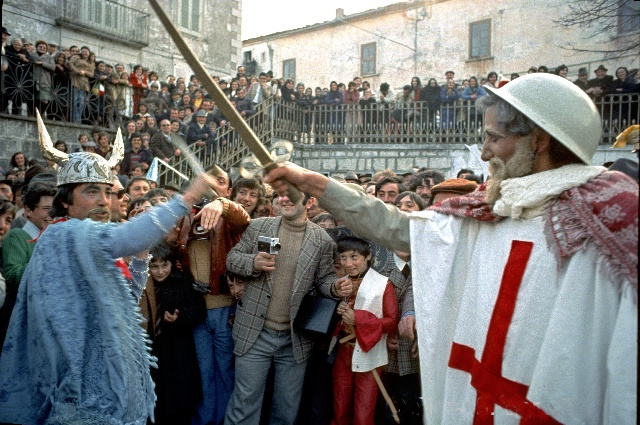
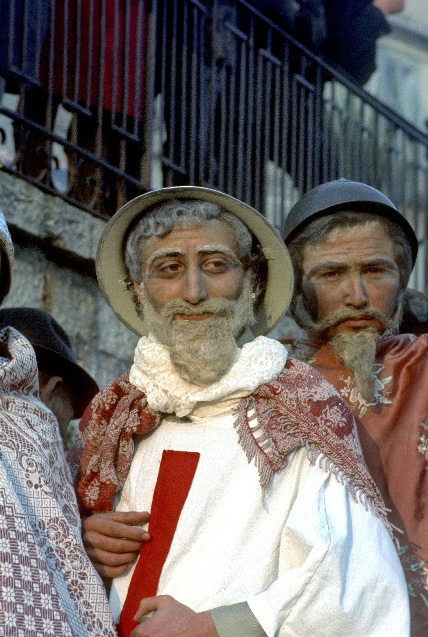
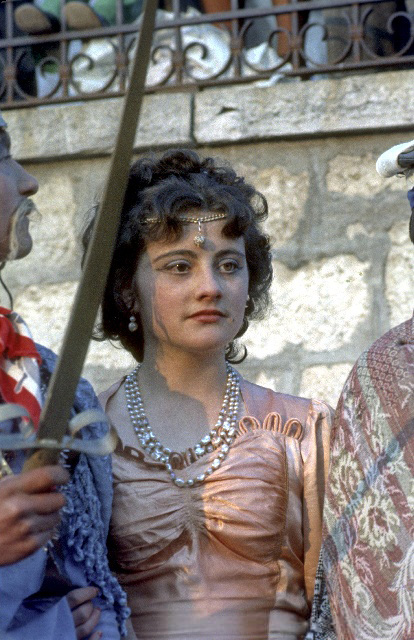
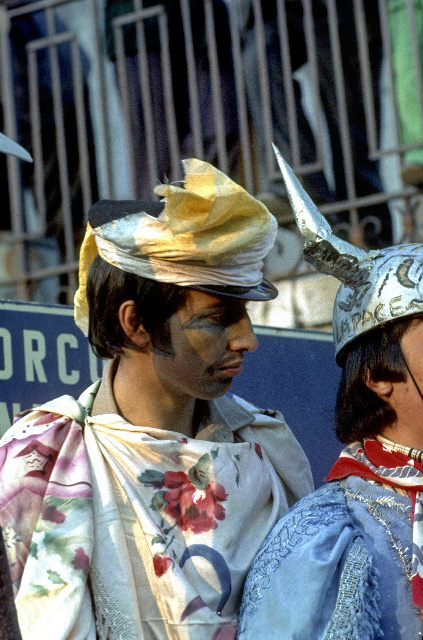
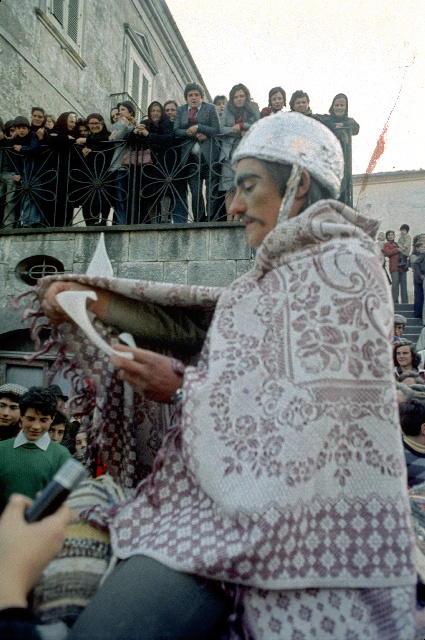
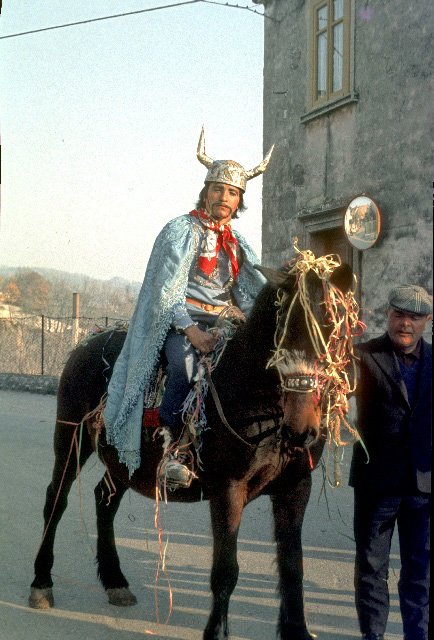

==== Saint Day ====
The comune's patron saint is Saint Sebastian. They annually celebrate his feast day on 20 January. In the comune there is a church dedicated to him, built by the del Balzo family in 1536. It is said there is a local legend.

===== Local legend =====
The local legend of a miner and his fortune helped develop a 'cult' towards Saint Sebastian in Santa Croce del Sannio.

The legend dictates that it the year was 1900, and an emigrant set sail for America in search of desperate fortune, leaving behind his wife and young children in considerable poverty. During the crossing of the Atlantic, the ship he was on encountered a strong storm, and he, in great fear, invoked the protection of Saint Sebastian, to whom he was particularly devoted. At that moment, he was approached by a young man with a vaguely familiar face who began to reassure him, telling him, among other things, that he, like him, was from Santa Croce del Sannio and that his name was Sebastiano Nobile. Upon arriving in America, the two went their separate ways, and the emigrant managed to find work as a miner. One day, the emigrant was overcome by exhaustion, discouragement from the arduous work, and homesickness for his family. At that very moment, he heard someone calling him and recognized, among the miners, the young man he had met on the ship. The young man urged him to follow him out of the mine, along with all his colleagues, to hear the bells of Santa Croce ring. As soon as he reached the surface, the mine collapsed, burying all the other miners. No trace of the young man remained. Finally returning home, the emigrant looked for his saviour at the address the man had given him on the ship: "...in the square, an isolated house, easy to find because it is accessed by a flight of steps..." The man was unable to find either the house or anyone who might know the young man, until he found himself in front of the church of the patron saint, realizing it was the only building with the characteristics he was looking for. Once inside, looking at the statue of the saint, he recognized the face of his benefactor.

=== Institutions, bodies and associations ===
==== GM Galanti Historical Institute ====
The GM Galanti Historical Institute is a cultural association founded in December 1981 by the city council with the aim of reconstructing and illustrating the processes of anthropization in the territory, the formation of urban settlements and the cultural, social and political traditions connected to these phenomena.

The institute operates as a protector of existing local archives with aims to organize a specialised library on the history of the Sannio region, holding collection of various testimonies of material culture and archaeological discoveries, to be set up in an ethnological museum and finally the publication of works on the local populations. The Institute's publications include:

- I liguri apuani nell'Alto Sannio (1981)
- Guida storica e urbanistica di Santa Croce (1982)
- G.M.Galanti, Nella cultura del Settecento meridionale (1984)
- Santa Croce e il Risorgimento italiano (1984)
- Girolamo Vitelli e la nuova filologia (1986)
- Requiem per Camillo Vitelli (1986)
- La chiesa matrice Santa Maria Assunta (1987)
- Illuminismo meridionale e comunità locali (1988)
- La cultura della transumanza (1992)
- La cappella di San Giovanni (1992)
- Dal comunitarismo pastorale all'individualismo agrario nell'Appennino dei tratturi (1993)
- Testimonianze della Seconda guerra mondiale e degli anni della ricostruzione a Santa Croce del Sannio, dal 1943 al 1950 (1999)

==== G. Vitelli municipal library ====
The G. Vitelli municipal library contains over 4,000 volumes, all catalogued and computerized. The library has also published several books on folk songs and ancient crafts of the town. It is dedicated to famed local papyrologist Girolamo Vitelli (1849–1935).

==== Traces – A shared sheep track ====
Often called 'Tracce' or 'The Tracks Project' (full name: Traces – A shared sheep track") is a collaborative effort between the regional governments of Santa Croce del Sannio and neighbouring municipality, Circello. The aim of the project is to tackle the municipalities' decreasing population whilst also bringing awareness to their area's history. Funded by the PNRR Measure M1C3, Intervention 2.1 – Attractiveness of historic villages, more commonly referred to as the "villages call project". The project's name was "democratically chosen".

== Infrastructure and transport ==
=== Roads ===
The municipality is crossed by the provincial road 55 which allows easy connection with the state road 87 Sannitica, as well as by the provincial roads 64, 66, 67 and 105.

=== Railways ===
The municipality is served by the Santa Croce del Sannio station on the Campobasso-Benevento line, located in the municipality of Morcone and active only for tourist purposes.

=== Bus lines ===
The municipality can also be reached by private bus companies on the Santa Croce-Benevento, Cercemaggiore-Naples line, with connections to Benevento and Naples.

== Notable people ==
- Giuseppe Maria Galanti (1743–1806), Economist
- Luigi Galanti (1756–1836), Geographer
- Girolamo Vitelli (1849–1935), Papyrologist
