= Tratturo Pescasseroli-Candela =

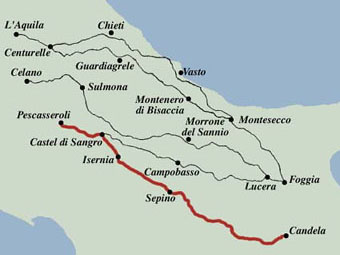
Map of major drovers' roads in southern Italy, with Tratturo Pescasseroli-Candela highlighted in red

The Tratturo Pescasseroli-Candela is a drovers' road running between Pescasseroli in Abruzzo and Candela in Apulia. It is the third longest such route in southern Italy, and is also named La via della lana ("The wool pathway").

== Geography ==
The Tratturo Pescasseroli-Candela runs between Pescasseroli in Abruzzo and Candela in Apulia, covering a distance of 211 kilometres (131 mi), and is up to 60 metres (200 ft) wide along some stretches.

It is still used for seasonal migration of herds. Some historians, such as Wisemann, believe that it follows the same route as the Via Minucia Traiana, an ancient Roman road.

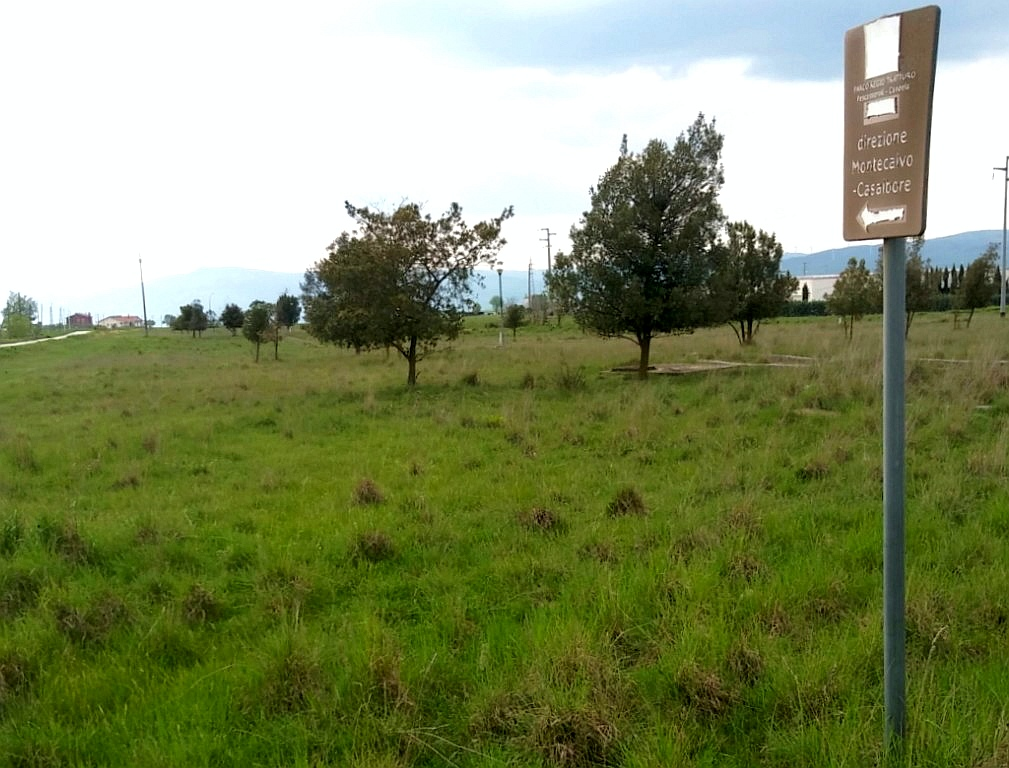
The Tratturo along Campanian Apennines, near Ariano Irpino
