= Giuseppe Maria Galanti =

Italian economist

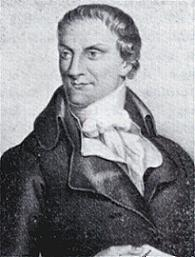
Giuseppe Maria Galanti as depicted in 1806

Giuseppe Maria Galanti (1743–1806) was an Italian historian and economist, in the Kingdom of Naples.

== Life ==
Galanti was born in Santa Croce di Morcone, Molise (today Santa Croce del Sannio, Benevento). He was the first-born son of Count Giambattista Galanti (1703–1767) and Countess Agata Musacchi Topia Scanderbeg di Campomarino. He was eldest brother of Luigi Galanti (born 1765).

While young he was influenced by independent-minded priests and came to hate feudalism.

At the age of nine he went to study in Naples, being cared over by his uncle. In his youth he was a follower of Pietro Giannone and became fond of the ideas of Gaetano Filangieri. He studied under Antonio Genovesi, attending his economic lectures at the University of Naples Federico II. During his studies he became friends with young intellectuals such as the brothers Domenico and Francescantonio Grimaldi, Francesco Mario Pagano, Melchiorre Delfico and Antonio Jerocades. Genovesi's school was interested in economic and social problems. He graduated in law on 18 April 1765, but almost never practiced law.

After Genovesi's death in 1769, Galanti composed Elogio storico del signor abate Antonio Genovesi (English: Historical Eulogy of Abbot Antonio Genovesi) which was anonymously published in Naples in 1772 and then Venice in 1774. The work brought him proceedings by the Inquisition as Galanti had submitted it to them for judgement, on which they rejected it on ecclesiastical grounds. In 1773 Galanti turned directly to Voltaire to denounce the imposed clerical obstacle. The problem was resolved until the republication of the book for a new Venetian edition in 1774, after which ecclesiastical permission was again requested and rejected on ecclesiastical grounds. Galanti's attitude towards the Church was addressed in a work in 1780 (later updated in 1788) published by the Literary and Typographic Society of Naples, a publishing company founded by Galanti in 1777.

In the summers of 1779 and 1780, which Galanti spent in his hometown of Santa Croce di Morcone, he dedicated himself to the study of southern society, beginning first of to examine the Italian south from a historical point of view. In 1783 he compiled a history of the Samnite people, ancient inhabitants of Molise, and an essay on the protohistory of Italy was written; however, they were preceded in 1781 by a Descrizione del Molise in due tomi (English: Description of Molise in two volumes) where, among other things, Galanti exposes the effects of the "monstrous" feudal system in the countryside of the kingdom of Naples.

With the title Visitatore generale del Regno, he surveyed the state of the kingdom, and proposed agricultural and economic reforms. A critic of the top layers of Neapolitan society, he considered them too little interested in commerce. During his surveillance of the southern provinces he would bring along his brother, Luigi (1765–1836), these excursions would happen a lot throughout the brothers' lives.

Galanti was a supporter of mercantilism.

== Works ==
- Galanti, Giuseppe Maria (1781). Elogio storico del signor Abate Antonio Genovesi. Naples.
- Elogio di Niccolò Machiavelli cittadino e segretario fiorentino. Con un Discorso intorno alla costituzione della Società ed al governo politico (1779)
- Galanti, Giuseppe Maria (1781). Descrizione del Estado Antico ed Attuale del Contado di Molise, First volume. Naples: La Sociedad Letterario ed Tipografica.
- Saggio sopra l' antica storia de' primi abitatori dell'Italia (1783)
- Galanti, Giuseppe Maria (1793). Descrizione geografica e politica delle Sicilie, First volume. Naples: I soci di Gabinetto Letterario. (Five volumes, 1786–1794).
- Giornale di viaggio in Calabria (1792)
- Galanti, Giuseppe Maria (1792). Breve descrizione della città di Napoli e del suo contorno. Naples: I soci di Gabinetto Letterario.
- --do.--(critical edition, Maria Rosaria Pelizzari, 2000)
- Memoria intorno allo stato dei Banchi (1799)
- Testamento forense (1806)
- Scritti sulla Calabria (critical edition, 1993)
- Memorie storiche del mio tempo e altri scritti di natura autobiografica (1761-1806) (critical edition, 1996)
- Pensieri vari e altri scritti della tarda maturità (critical edition, 2000)
- Prospetto storico sulle vicende del genere umano (critical edition, 2000)
