= Luigi Galanti =

Italian geographer, educator, translator, and cleric

Luigi Maria Galanti (1 January 1765 – 31 March 1836) was an Italian geographer, educator, translator, and cleric, active in the Kingdom of Naples during the first decades of the nineteenth century.

== Early life and education ==
Luigi Maria Galanti was born on 1 January 1765 in Santa Croce di Morcone (today Santa Croce del Sannio, Benevento). He was the younger brother of Giuseppe Maria Galanti (1743–1806), famed Italian economist. He was a part of the noble Galanti family, son of Count Giambattista Galanti (1703–1767) and Countess Agata Musacchi Topia Scanderbeg di Campomarino.

At the age of twelve (by his own choice), Galanti entered the Benedictine order of Montevergine, where he studied theology, philosophy, mathematics, and physics. During his studies he self taught himself in the fields of science and liberal arts whilst attaining the languages of English and French in addition to his native Italian. Throughout his youth he alternated periods at the monastery of Montevergine with stays in Rome, at the Roman Curia between 1777 and 1805, during which time he came into contact with intellectual circles linked to late eighteenth-century reformist thought.

Luigi made his professione triennale (English: 'three-year religious profession') at Casamarciano in 1781. From 1781 to 1786, he studied philosophy and theology at the Roman Curia, and from 1787 to 1788 at the Curia of Aversa.

== Career ==
=== Scholar & priest (1789-1805) ===
In 1789, he became a school lecturer, master of the professed, and librarian at Montevergine. From 1790 to 1791, he was a lecturer in scholastic and moral studies at Capua. During his studies at Capua, Luigi would begin making trips with his brother, Giuseppe Maria Galanti.

In 1792, he was appointed lecturer in scholastic and moral studies at Montevergine, then master of the professed. From 1793 to 1795, he was lecturer and secretary at Casamarciano, and the following year in Aversa.

From 1797 to 1803 (except for 1798–99, when he stayed in Pozzuoli, following a health request to the Abbot of Montevergine and King Ferdinand IV), he alternated as a teacher and priest between Montevergine and Casamarciano.

=== Abbot under Pope Pius VII (1805-1806) ===
Finally, in 1805, he was appointed titular abbot by Pope Pius VII. In 1806, he asked to reside in Naples, and the following year, following the suppression of the monasteries, he retired permanently to his family.

=== Post-Retirement (1806-1836) ===
After his retirement to Naples (post-suppression of monasteries), he was appreciated by the French authorities. He was appointed professor of geography first at the University of Naples, and then at the newly formed Nunziatella Military School, which he helped form. Whilst working at the Military School he taught history and literature.

He was also elected as deputato (member of parliament) for the Molise constituency in the revolutionary parliament of 1820.

== Personal life ==
=== Time with Brother/Southern Excursions ===
Throughout Luigi's life he would make many excursions and explore the southern provinces under the Kingdom of Naples alongside his brother, Giuseppe Maria Galanti (1743–1806). The trip united the Galanti brothers, and pushed Luigi to support the reform proposed by Antonio Genovesi in 1777.

=== Contributions and honours ===
He contributed to local commemorations: he designed inscriptions on three memorial plaques. One was in the entrance hall of the abbey palace in Loreto, and the other two in the Sanctuary of Montevergine. These commemorated the stay of Francis I of the Two Sicilies and his court between 29 and 30 August 1826, and the reconfirmation of ecclesiastical jurisdiction granted by Francis I in 1815.

The archive at Montevergine holds some of his autographed notes on books in their library, and he is included in the Archivio possessori (archive of book owners) of Montevergine.

== Death ==
He died on March 31, 1836, in his home in Capodichino.

== Works ==
- Traduzione della Geografia di Pinkerton (1805)
- Istituzioni di geografia fisica e politica per uso del Primo Collegio Reale (1808)
- Traduzione della Storia Antica e Moderna di Millot (1809)
- Geografia elementare (1812)
- Catechismo Costituzionale per uso del Regno Unito delle Sicilie (1812)
- Atlante Universale e Portatile di Geografia Antica e Moderna (1817)
- Geografia fisica e politica (1833)
