= Candela, Apulia =

Candela
- Comune
- Comune di Candela
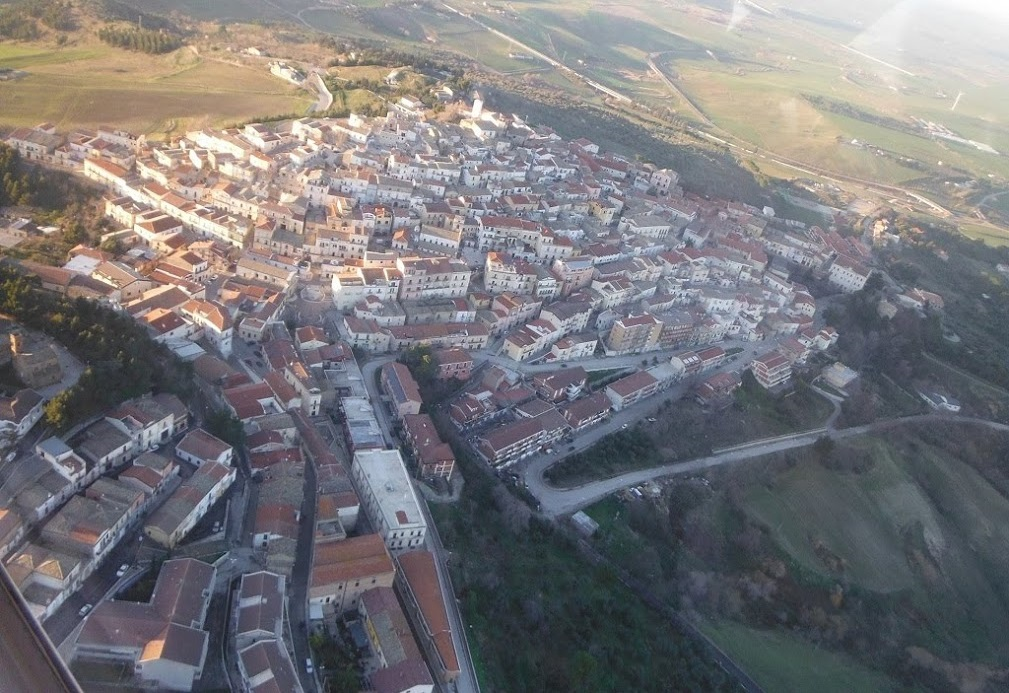
- View of Candela

- Coat of arms

- Location within Italy Location within Apulia
- Coordinates: 41°8′N 15°31′E
- Country: Italy
- Region: Apulia
- Province: Foggia (FG)

Government
  - Mayor: Giuseppe De Vitto

Area
  - Total: 96.82 km^{2} (37.38 sq mi)
- Elevation: 474 m (1,555 ft)

Population (30 April 2017)
  - Total: 2,700
  - Density: 28/km^{2} (72/sq mi)
- Demonym: Candelesi
- Time zone: UTC+1 (CET)
  - Summer (DST): UTC+2 (CEST)
- Postal code: 71024
- Dialing code: 0885
- Patron saint: Pope Clement I
- Saint day: 7
- Website: Official website

Candela (Pugliese: Cannéla) is a town and comune in the province of Foggia in the Apulia region of southeast Italy. It sits on 2 hills: San Rocco and San Tommaso.
