= Raccordo autostradale RA9 =

Controlled-access highway in Italy

Raccordo autostradale 9
- Motorway connection 9
- Raccordo autostradale di Benevento; Benevento motorway connection

Route information
- Maintained by ANAS
- Length: 12.7 km (7.9 mi)
- Existed: 1977–present

Major junctions
- South end: Venticano
- A16 in Venticano
- North end: Benevento

Location
- Country: Italy
- Regions: Campania

Highway system
- Roads in Italy; Autostrade; State; Regional; Provincial; Municipal
| ← RA 8 | → RA 10 |

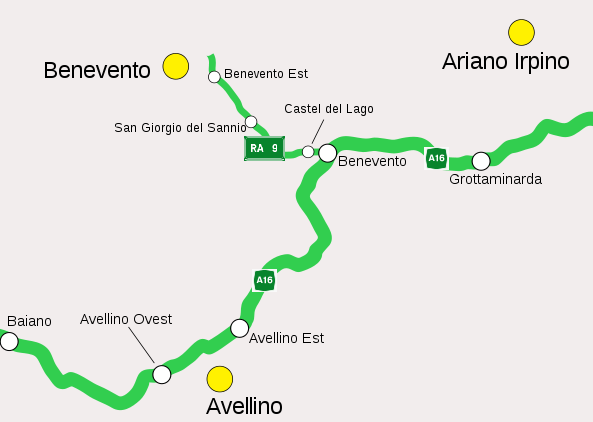
Detailed map of the Raccordo autostradale RA9

Raccordo autostradale 9 (RA 9; "Motorway connection 9") or Raccordo autostradale di Benevento ("Benevento motorway connection") is an autostrada (Italian for "motorway") 12.7 kilometres (7.9 mi) long in Italy located in the region of Campania that connects the Autostrada A16 Napoli-Canosa in Venticano to the city of Benevento.

== Route ==
RACCORDO AUTOSTRADALE 9 Raccordo autostradale di Benevento
| Exit | ↓km↓ | ↑km↑ | Province | European Route |
| Napoli - Canosa | 0.0 km (0 mi) | 12.7 km (7.9 mi) | AV | -- |
| Toll gate Benevento | 0.0 km (0 mi) | 12.7 km (7.9 mi) | AV | -- |
| Castello del Lago; Via Appia | 0.1 km (0.062 mi) | 12.6 km (7.8 mi) | AV | -- |
| San Giorgio del Sannio; Calvi; Apice; Via Appia | 6.3 km (3.9 mi) | 6.4 km (4.0 mi) | BN | -- |
| Benevento Est; San Nicola Manfredi; Via Appia; Rione Libertà; Ciro Vigorito Stadium | 12.3 km (7.6 mi) | 0.4 km (0.25 mi) | BN | -- |
| Telesina; Sannitica - Campobasso; Roma - Napoli | 12.7 km (7.9 mi) | 0.0 km (0 mi) | BN | -- |

== See also ==
- Autostrade of Italy
- Roads in Italy
- Transport in Italy

=== Other Italian roads ===
- State highways (Italy)
- Regional road (Italy)
- Provincial road (Italy)
- Municipal road (Italy)
