= San Marco ai Monti =

- Frazione
- Location of San Marco ai Monti in Italy
- Coordinates: 41°4′N 14°48′E
- Country: Italy
- Region: Campania
- Province: Benevento (BN)
- Comune: Sant'Angelo a Cupolo
- Elevation: 610 m (2,000 ft)

Population (Apr. 2008)
  - Total: 200
- Time zone: UTC+1 (CET)
  - Summer (DST): UTC+2 (CEST)
- Postal code: 82010
- Dialing code: 0824

San Marco ai Monti is an Italian village, frazione of Sant'Angelo a Cupolo, a municipality of the Province of Benevento in Campania. As of 25 April 2008, it had a population of 200 inhabitants.

== Geography ==
The village is located about 50 km northeast of Naples and about 9 km south of Benevento. Other nearest towns are Sant'Angelo a Cupolo, Ceppaloni, Chianche, San Leucio del Sannio, San Martino Sannita and San Nicola Manfredi.

== History ==
Settled on a hill near the river Sabato, this little town is about 10 km away from Benevento. In sixteenth century San Marco was part of the papal territory of Benevento, and it continued to be until the creation of the province of Benevento, after the unification of Italy. During these centuries San Marco was subject to the Stato Pontificio.

There are also signs in some documents of about 1700 in which San Marco ai Monti is referred as an autonomous municipality, until 1865, year of the suppression of the autonomy and aggregation to the municipality of Sant'Angelo a Cupolo. It was important enough in 1702 that Cardinal Vincenzo Maria Orsini, later Pope Benedict XIII, paid a visit to the church for two days, and celebrated Sunday mass there.

== Cultural, artistic and environmental goods ==
The territory of San Marco ai Monti is an environment protected by the Italian law. It is declared a territory of public interest because of its landscape. This includes the Belvedere of Sannio, a natural terrace which offers an incredible panoramic view of the territory of Sannio.

== Economy ==
Even if the first source of income is the farming, San Marco ai Monti offers some attractives for tourism. The sport-touristic complex of "Selva del Barone" offers a swimming pool and a soccer court. The town centre also offers a bar ("la lucertola") and a restaurant ("el duende"), which are particularly active in summer.

== Events ==
On April 25 and July 26 there are religious activities of San Marco Evangelista and S.Anna. Also, on August, there is a typical gastronomic manifestation, named "Sagra del cicatiello", based on cicatiello, a kind of pasta, with many recipes including it.

== Tourism ==
Natural tracks and excursions are attractions of this natural territory, which offers woods, a river-side walk and a landscape from the named Belvedere of Sannio.
