= Principality of Benevento (Napoleonic) =

Napoleonic client state

Principality of Benevento Principato di Benevento (Italian)
- 1806–1815
- Coat of arms of Talleyrand-Périgord

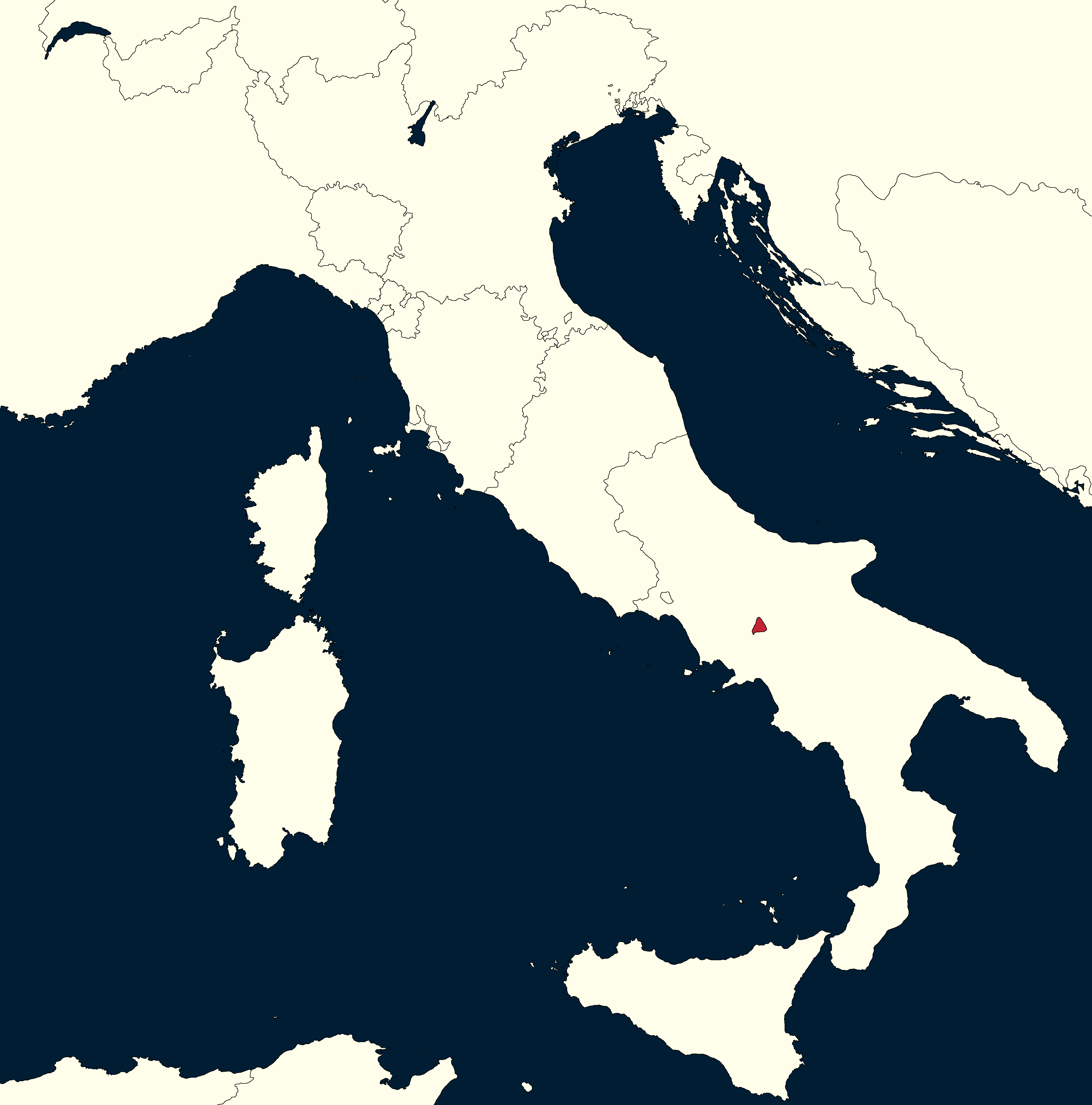
- Benevento in 1806
- Status: Client state
- Capital: Benevento
- Government: Monarchy
  - Prince: Charles Maurice de Talleyrand-Périgord (1806–1815)
- Historical era: Napoleonic Wars
  - Creation: 28 August 1806
  - Restored to papal control: 28 August 1815
Preceded by	Succeeded by
Papal States	Papal States

The Principality of Benevento was a principality in Italy created by Napoleon after he became King of Italy in 1805. Its territory mostly coincided with that of the Duchy of Benevento, a papal enclave within the Kingdom of Naples. In addition to the capital city of Benevento, it included a contado subdivided into 12 centers: Sant'Angelo a Cupolo, Motta, Panelli, Pastene, Maccabei, Bagnara, Montorso, Maccoli, Perillo, Sciarra, San Leucio del Sannio, San Marco ai Monti.

The principality was created by Napoleon for his chief diplomat Charles Maurice de Talleyrand-Périgord. It was nominally sovereign, but the prince did have to take an oath to the king.

The principality was short-lived. Talleyrand was never to settle down and actually rule his new principality. In 1815, after the Napoleonic Wars, the town was ceded back to the Papal States.

In 1860, it joined Pontecorvo, the other southern Italian papal exclave, in being united with the new Kingdom of Italy.

== Sources ==
- Cooper, Duff (1932). Talleyrand. New York: Harper.
