= Maria Maddalena Capece Galeota =

Duchess of Regina

- Duchess of Regina (Note: Maria Maddalena's full titles among the Italian nobility were Princess of Achaea, Duchess of Regina and Duchess of Sant'Angelo a Fasanella, Princess of Montemiletto, Duchess of Popoli, Duchess of Apice and Countess of Monteaperti.)

Princess of Achaea (Neapolitan nobility)
- Reign: 14 August 1908 – 6 April 1933
- Predecessor: Carlo Capece Galeota
- Born: 11 December 1859; Naples
- Died: 6 April 1933 (aged 73); Naples
- Spouse: Giuseppe Carelli
- House: Capece Galeota
- Father: Carlo Capece Galeota
- Mother: Maria Maddalena Carafa della Stadera

Donna Maria Maddalena Capece Galeota (11 December 1859 – 6 April 1933) was an early 20th-century Italian noblewoman. From the death of her father Carlo Capece Galeota in 1908 to her own death in 1933, she held various titles, most prominently the traditional family title of the Capece Galeota family, Duchess of Regina. She was the last to hold the Neapolitan title of Princess (Prince) of Achaea, a title created for her ancestor Antonio Tocco in 1642, to honour his female line descent from the rulers of the Principality of Achaea.

== Biography ==
Maria Maddalena Capece Galeota was born in Naples on 11 December 1859, as the eldest daughter, and eldest child overall, of Carlo Capece Galeota, Duke of Regina and Duke of Sant'Angelo a Fasanella, Prince of Montemiletto and titular Prince of Achaea, Duke of Popoli, Duke of Apice and Count of Monteaperti. Her mother was the noblewoman Maria Maddalena Carafa della Stadera. Upon the death of her father on 14 August 1908, Maria Maddalena inherited all of his titles. Her younger brother Francesco, Carlo's only son, would have been the heir, but he predeceased their father, dying in a motor accident near Cassino in 1901. The title used most prominently was 'Duchess of Regina' (Duchessa della Regina), which is also the only title used in Maria Maddalena's obituary.

According to Maria Maddalena's obituary, she was 'a woman of high counsel, of high rectitude, lavish towards everyone with her exquisite intelligence and with the generosity of her heart'. She was affiliated with the Salesians of Don Bosco, a Catholic congregation of men, cooperating in the foundation of the first Salesian House in Naples.

Maria Maddalena married the nobleman Giuseppe Carelli in Naples on 5 October 1891, aged 32. The couple did not have any children. Maria Maddalena died peacefully in her home in Naples on 6 April 1933. As Maria Maddalena had outlived both of her younger sisters, Maria Sofia (died unmarried on 3 March 1933) and Maria Caterina (died a Salesian Sister on 12 February 1916), her death rendered the senior, ducal, branch of the Capece Galeota family extinct and their titles vacant.
