= San Nazzaro, Campania =

San Nazzaro
- Comune
- Comune di San Nazzaro
- Location within Italy Location within Campania
- Coordinates: 41°3′N 14°52′E
- Country: Italy
- Region: Campania
- Province: Benevento (BN)

Government
  - Mayor: Luigi Pasquale Pepe

Area
  - Total: 2.0 km^{2} (0.77 sq mi)

Population (31 December 2007)
  - Total: 877
  - Density: 440/km^{2} (1,100/sq mi)
- Demonym: Sannazzareni
- Time zone: UTC+1 (CET)
  - Summer (DST): UTC+2 (CEST)
- Postal code: 82010
- Dialing code: 0824
- Website: Official website

San Nazzaro is a comune (municipality) in the Province of Benevento in the Italian region Campania, located about 60 km (37 mi) northeast of Naples and about 12 km (7.5 mi) southeast of Benevento.

San Nazzaro borders the following comunes: Apice, Calvi, Mirabella Eclano, Pietradefusi, San Giorgio del Sannio, Venticano.

== History ==
Up until 1958, San Nazzaro formed a single commune with present-day Calvi, named San Nazzaro Calvi.
