= Montefusco =

- Comune
- Comune di Montefusco
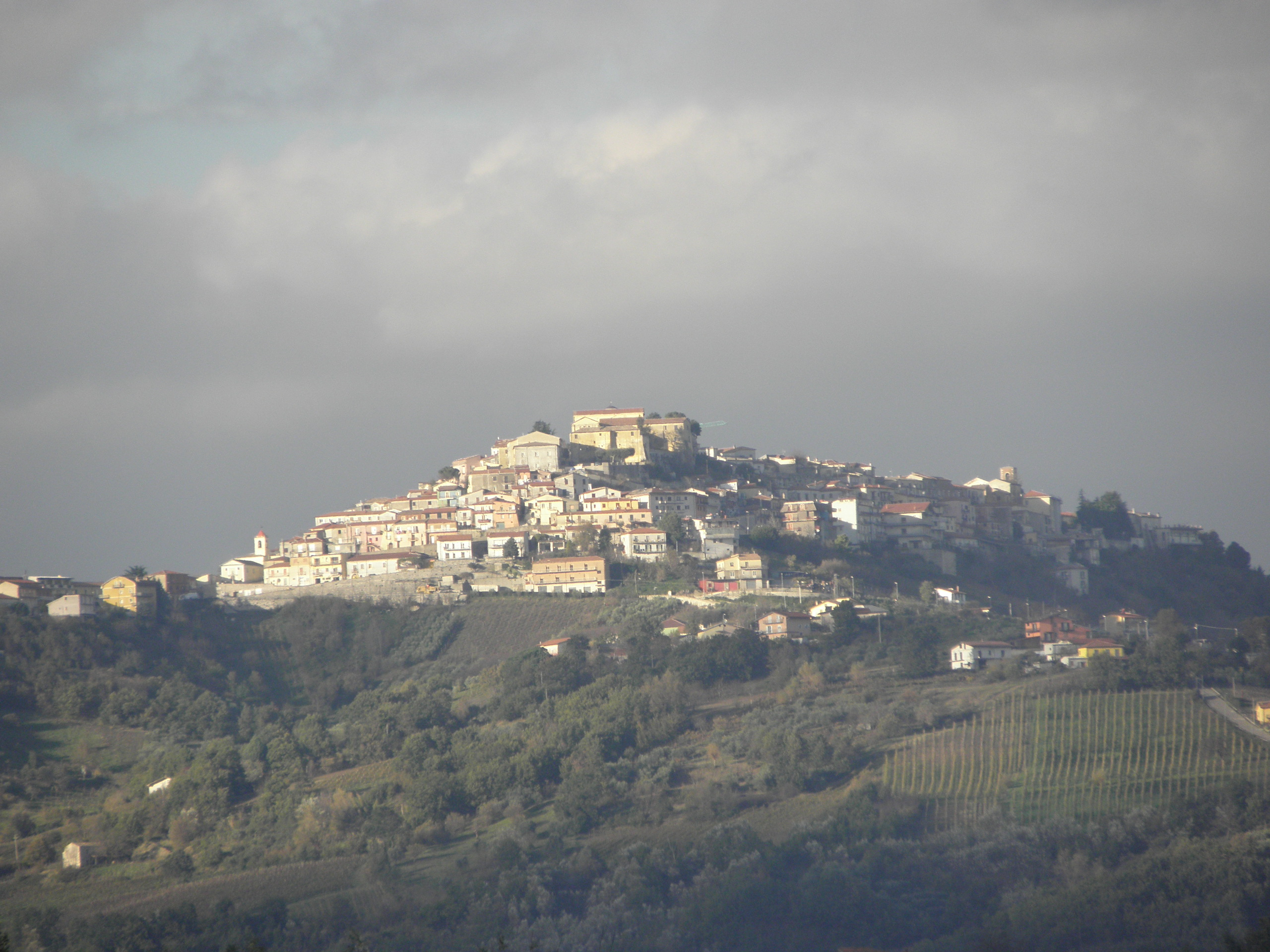
- Montefusco

- Location within Italy Location within Campania
- Coordinates: 41°2′N 14°51′E
- Country: Italy
- Region: Campania
- Province: Avellino (AV)
- Frazioni: Montemiletto, Pietradefusi, San Martino Sannita (BN), San Nazzaro (BN), San Nicola Manfredi (BN), Santa Paolina, Torrioni

Area
  - Total: 8 km^{2} (3.1 sq mi)
- Elevation: 707 m (2,320 ft)

Population (1 January 2023)
  - Total: 1,194
  - Density: 150/km^{2} (390/sq mi)
- Demonym: Montefuscani or Fuscolomontani
- Time zone: UTC+1 (CET)
  - Summer (DST): UTC+2 (CEST)
- Postal code: 83030
- Dialing code: 0825
- ISTAT code: 064056
- Website: Official website

Montefusco is a town and comune in the province of Avellino, Campania, Italy. The town is located on the top of a hill overlooking the Sabato river valley.
