= Carlo Capece Galeota =

Duke of Regina

- Duke of Regina (Note: Carlo's full titles among the Italian nobility were Prince of Achaea, Duke of Regina and Duke of Sant'Angelo a Fasanella, Prince of Montemiletto, Duke of Popoli, Duke of Apice and Count of Monteaperti.)
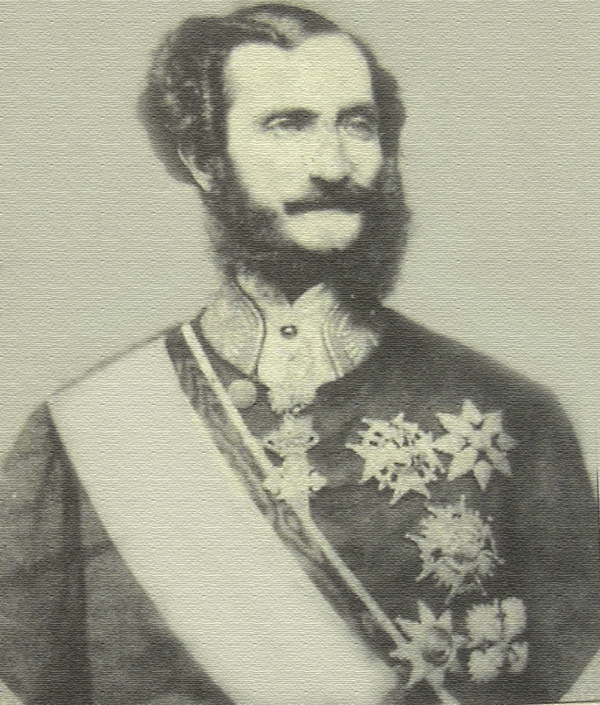
- Photograph of Carlo Capece Galeota

Prince of Achaea (Neapolitan nobility)
- Reign: 8 March 1889 – 14 August 1908
- Predecessor: Carlo III di Tocco Cantelmo Stuart
- Successor: Maria Maddalena Capece Galeota
- Born: 17 February 1824; Naples
- Died: 14 August 1908 (aged 84)
- Spouse: Maria Maddalena Carafa della Stadera
- House: Capece Galeota
- Father: Francesco Capece Galeota
- Mother: Maria Maddalena di Tocco Cantelmo Stuart

Don Carlo Capece Galeota (17 February 1824 – 14 August 1908) was an Italian nobleman, holding the titles of Duke of Regina and Duke of Sant'Angelo a Fasanella from the death of his father Francesco Capece Galeota in 1838 to his own death in 1908. From 1889 onwards, Carlo was also recognized as the heir to the extinct Tocco family (extinct in 1884), as he was a matrilineal descendant of the family, assuming their titles of Prince of Montemiletto and titular Prince of Achaea, among others.

== Biography ==
Carlo Capece Galeota was born in Naples on 17 February 1824. He was the son of Francesco Capece Galeota, Duke of Regina and Duke of Sant'Angelo a Fasanella, and Maria Maddalena di Tocco Cantelmo Stuart. Upon his father Francesco's death on 5 May 1838, Carlo inherited his titles. Though they held two ducal titles, the Capece Galeota family primarily identified themselves only with the title of 'Duke of Regina' (Duca della Regina in Italian).

On 24 March 1884, Carlo III di Tocco Cantelmo Stuart, Prince of Montemiletto and titular Prince of Achaea, the last of the Tocco family, died unmarried and childless. Carlo Capece Galeota was the matrilineal grandson of Carlo II di Tocco Cantelmo Stuart, Carlo III's grandfather, and thus laid claim to the Tocco inheritance. Carlo was recognized by the Corte di cassazione del Tribunale di Napoli ('Court of Cassation of the Court of Naples') on 21 January 1888 as the heir to the titles of the Tocco family, and his rights were confirmed through an Italian ministerial decree on 8 March 1889. Carlo thus acquired the titles of Prince of Montemiletto and Prince of Achaea, as well as the other Tocco family titles of Duke of Popoli, Duke of Apice and Count of Monteaperti.

On 12 February 1859, Carlo married Maria Maddalena Carafa della Stadera at Naples.

Carlo died on 14 August 1908. Given that Carlo's only son, Francesco, predeceased him through dying in a motor accident near Cassino in 1901, the heir to all of his titles was his eldest daughter, Maria Maddalena Capece Galeota.

== Family ==
With his wife Maria Maddalena Carafa della Stadera, Carlo Capece Galeota had four children:

- Maria Maddalena Capece Galeota (11 December 1859 – 6 April 1933), the eldest daughter and heir to Carlo's titles.
- Maria Sofia Capece Galeota (10 February 1861 – 3 March 1933), daughter.
- Maria Caterina Capece Galeota (10 August 1862 – 12 February 1916), daughter.
- Francesco Capece Galeota (12 February 1864 – 20 June 1901), son.
