= Cardullo =

Cardullo is a surname. Notable people with the surname include:

- Mario Cardullo (born 1957), American inventor
- Paola Cardullo (born 1982), Italian volleyball player
- Stephen Cardullo (born 1987), American baseball player

== See also ==
- Cardillo
