= Sant'Angelo a Cupolo =

- Comune
- Comune di Sant'Angelo a Cupolo
- Sant'Angelo within the Province of Benevento

- Location within Italy Location within Campania
- Coordinates: 41°4′N 14°48′E
- Country: Italy
- Region: Campania
- Province: Province of Benevento (BN)
- Frazioni: Bagnara, Cardilli, Maccoli, Medina, Montorsi, Motta, Panelli, Pastene, Perrillo, San Marco ai Monti, Sciarra

Area
  - Total: 10.9 km^{2} (4.2 sq mi)

Population (Dec. 2004)
  - Total: 4,262
  - Density: 391/km^{2} (1,010/sq mi)
- Time zone: UTC+1 (CET)
  - Summer (DST): UTC+2 (CEST)
- Postal code: 82010
- Dialing code: 0824

Sant'Angelo a Cupolo is a comune (municipality) in the Province of Benevento in the Italian region Campania, located about 50 km (31 mi) northeast of Naples and about 8 km (5.0 mi) south of Benevento. As of 31 December 2004, it had a population of 4,262 and an area of 10.9 km^{2} (4.2 sq mi).

== History ==
=== Emblems ===
The emblem of the municipality, as approved by the Decree of the Council in 1958, consists of two branches. One is an oak with acorns and another is a bay tree with berries that cross into each other below the point of the shield and are tied with a ribbon coloured in green, white and red. The emblem represents the dignity and the honour of a municipality, of a province and of a region.

=== Standard ===
The standard of the municipality is made of a light blue drape decorated with silver embroideries and an image of the emblem with the inscription: COMUNE DI SANT'ANGELO A CUPOLO.

== Geography ==
Sant'Angelo a Cupolo borders the following municipalities: Benevento, Ceppaloni, Chianche, San Leucio del Sannio, San Martino Sannita and San Nicola Manfredi. The municipality counts the hamlets (frazioni) of Bagnara, Cardilli, Maccoli, Medina, Montorsi, Motta, Panelli, Pastene, Perrillo, San Marco ai Monti and Sciarra.

- Bagnara is located at the southernmost point on the border with Avellino, separated from the rest of the territory of Sant'Angelo a Cupolo by Pagliara, which is part of the municipality of San Nicola Manfredi.
- Cardilli is a small hilly hamlet. Its name probably comes from the surname Cardillo, which was and still is today prevalent in this territory.
- Maccoli and Panelli are the smallest, but are considered to be characterised by the most beautiful landscapes.
- Montorsi is divided in two parts, Montorsi and Montorsi valle, linked to each other by a curvy path. The patron of this hamlet is the martyr San Donato, celebrated on 7 August.
- Motta is divided in two parts, Motta and Motta valle. The patronal celebration is 5 August, in honour of the Madonna della Neve.
- Perrillo is a hamlet inhabited by 1,200 people situated 3 km (1.9 mi) south of Benevento.
- San Marco ai Monti is especially known for its Belvedere del Sannio, a panoramic viewpoint from which it is possible to enjoy the view of almost all the territory of Benevento.

== Monuments and places of interest ==
=== Religious buildings ===
==== Convento dei Liguorini ====
The main monument of Sant'Angelo a Cupolo is the convent, built in 1775 on a small hill. At first it was the novitiates' headquarters and later became a rest home. Within is the chapel of Sant'Alfonso. The façade was expanded in 1925.

==== Cappella di San Michele ====
Near the cemetery can be found the Cappella di San Michele, probably built around the half of the sixteenth century.

==== Chiesa dei Santi Angelo e Leonardo ====
The church is characterised by the presence of the statue of San Michele from the sixteenth century and two frescoes: the one on the left of the altar is by Liborius Pizzella. In this building is also a painting depicting the Madonna del Latte.

== Demographics ==
Historical population

Year	Pop.	±%
1861	2,945	—
1871	2,812	−4.5%
1881	2,931	+4.2%
1901	3,209	+9.5%
1911	3,112	−3.0%

Year	Pop.	±%
1921	3,223	+3.6%
1931	3,644	+13.1%
1936	3,879	+6.4%
1951	4,291	+10.6%
1961	3,936	−8.3%

Year	Pop.	±%
1971	3,518	−10.6%
1981	3,627	+3.1%
1991	4,053	+11.7%
2001	4,185	+3.3%

Source: Data from ISTAT

== See also ==
- San Marco ai Monti
