= San Martino Sannita =

- Comune
- Comune di San Martino Sannita
- Location within Italy Location within Campania
- Coordinates: 41°4′N 14°50′E
- Country: Italy
- Region: Campania
- Province: Province of Benevento (BN)

Area
  - Total: 6.3 km^{2} (2.4 sq mi)

Population (Dec. 2004)
  - Total: 1,247
  - Density: 200/km^{2} (510/sq mi)
- Time zone: UTC+1 (CET)
  - Summer (DST): UTC+2 (CEST)
- Postal code: 82010
- Dialing code: 0824

San Martino Sannita is a comune (municipality) in the Province of Benevento in the Italian region Campania, located about 60 km (37 mi) northeast of Naples and about 9 km (5.6 mi) southeast of Benevento. As of 31 December 2004, it had a population of 1,247 and an area of 6.3 km^{2} (2.4 sq mi).

San Martino Sannita borders the following municipalities: Montefusco, San Giorgio del Sannio, San Nazzaro, San Nicola Manfredi, Sant'Angelo a Cupolo, Torrioni.

== Demographic evolution ==
Historical population

Year	Pop.	±%
1861	1,760	—
1871	1,809	+2.8%
1881	1,759	−2.8%
1901	1,975	+12.3%
1911	1,928	−2.4%

Year	Pop.	±%
1921	1,852	−3.9%
1931	1,862	+0.5%
1936	1,868	+0.3%
1951	1,900	+1.7%
1961	1,703	−10.4%

Year	Pop.	±%
1971	1,195	−29.8%
1981	1,084	−9.3%
1991	1,199	+10.6%
2001	1,180	−1.6%

Source: Data from ISTAT
