= Calore =

Calore may refer to:

- Calore, an Italian civil parish of the municipalities of Venticano (AV) and Mirabella Eclano (AV)
- Calore Irpino, an Italian river of the provinces of Benevento and Avellino (Campania)
- Calore Lucano, an Italian river of the province of Salerno (Campania)
- Calore, an album of the Italian singer Renato Zero
