= Calvi, Campania =

Calvi
- Comune
- Comune di Calvi
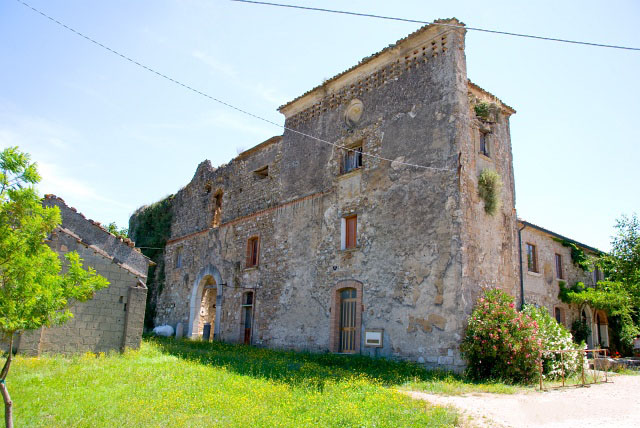
- Palace of Frederick II.

- Location within Italy Location within Campania
- Coordinates: 41°4′N 14°52′E
- Country: Italy
- Region: Campania
- Province: Benevento (BN)

Government
  - Mayor: Rocco Armando

Area
  - Total: 22.2 km^{2} (8.6 sq mi)
- Elevation: 376 m (1,234 ft)
- Highest elevation: 388 m (1,273 ft)
- Lowest elevation: 169 m (554 ft)

Population (1 January 2020)
  - Total: 2,581
  - Density: 116/km^{2} (301/sq mi)
- Demonym: Calvesi
- Time zone: UTC+1 (CET)
  - Summer (DST): UTC+2 (CEST)
- Postal code: 82010
- Dialing code: 0824
- ISTAT code: 062012
- Patron saint: Gerard Majella
- Saint day: 16 October
- Website: Official website

Calvi (Campanian: Coppacorte) is a comune (municipality) in the Province of Benevento in the southern Italian region Campania, located about 60 km (37 mi) northeast of Naples and about 10 km (6.2 mi) southeast of Benevento. It also belongs to the Samnium historical region. Its territory has an altitude of between 169m and 388m above sea level.

The name Calvi is derived either from the Latin adjective 'Calvus', meaning a barren or treeless place, or it could possibly come from the Latin name 'Calvus,' indicating ownership or property.

In the region of Calvi is an area known as Cubante or Covante. This area was a strategic pass for the ancient Appian Way and has historically been a site for encampments, including those from various historical battles involving figures like Tiberio Sempronio Gracco and general Annone

Up until 1958, San Nazzaro formed a single commune with present-day Calvi, named San Nazzaro Calvi.

Calvi borders the following municipalities: Apice, Mirabella Eclano, Pietradefusi, San Giorgio del Sannio, San Nazzaro, Venticano.

== Places of Interest ==
- Palace of Frederick II: Originally a hunting lodge for Frederick II of Swabia built around 1240, the building has undergone various renovations and ownership changes over the centuries, including acquisition by the Spinelli princes of San Giorgio la Montagna.
- Chapel of Santa Maria of Constantinople: Church built on via La Frazia for its namesake family by the Monks at Montevirgine in honor of Catherine of Valois.
- Church of San Gerardo Maiella
- Church of San Pio of Pietrelcina
