= Niccolò Coscia =

Italian Roman Catholic cardinal

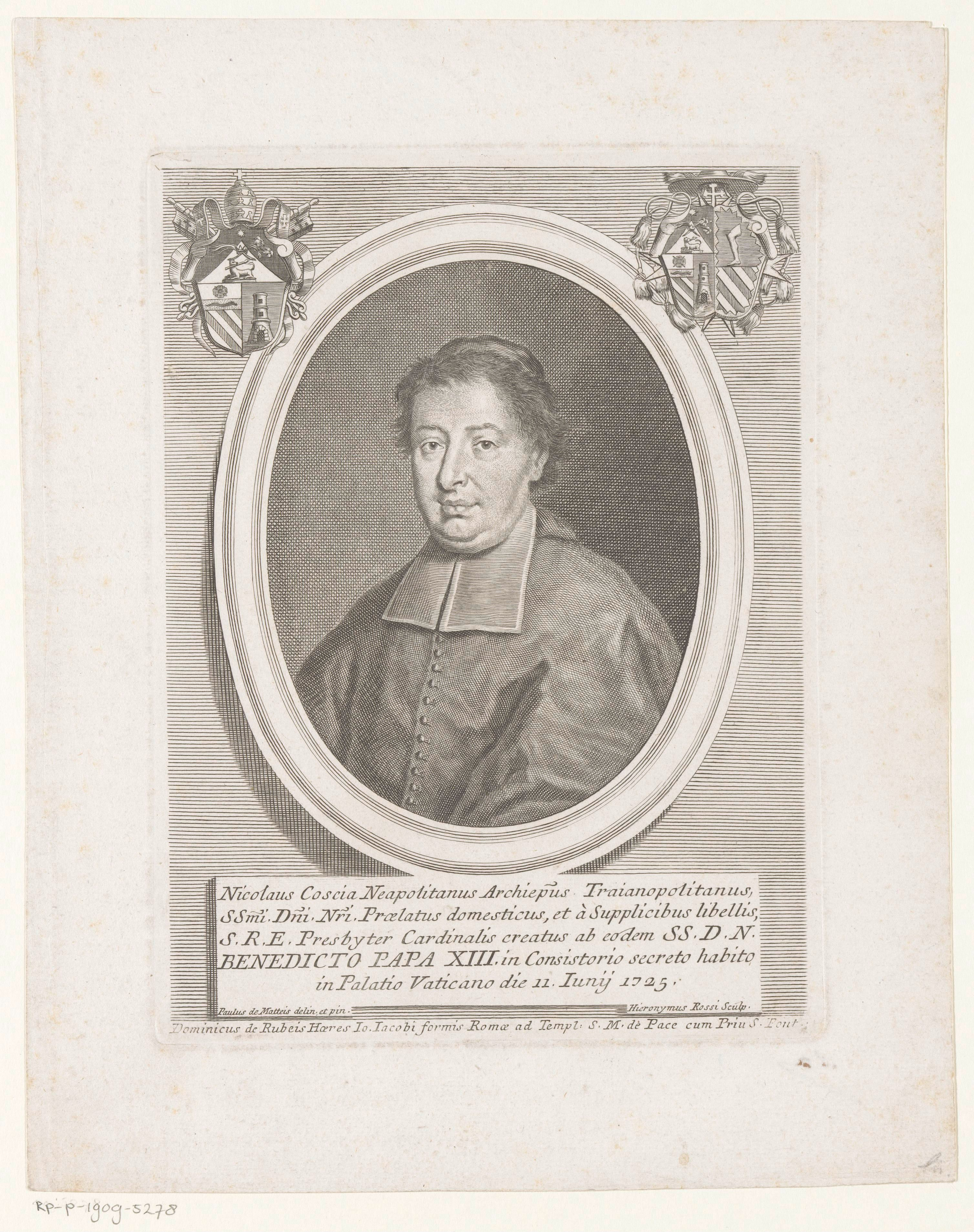
- Appointed: 1725

Personal details
- Born: 1681 Pietradefusi, Kingdom of Sicily
- Died: 8 February 1755 (aged 73–74) Naples, Kingdom of Sicily

Niccolò Coscia (1681 – 8 February 1755) was an Italian Latin Catholic cardinal.

He was born at Pietradefusi, near Avellino. In 1725, he was appointed as Cardinal of Santa Maria in Domnica by Pope Benedict XIII, whose secretary he had been when the future pope was Archbishop of Benevento.

Coscia held the effective government of the Papal States during Benedict's reign. He took advantage of his position to commit a long series of financial abuses, causing the ruin of the Papal treasury. According to Montesquieu, "All the money of Rome goes to Benevento... as the Beneventani direct [Benedict's] weakness".

When Benedict died, Coscia fled Rome. In 1731, he was tried, excommunicated and condemned to ten years' imprisonment in Castel Sant'Angelo. However, he managed to have his sentence commuted to a fine. Restored, he took part in the conclaves of 1730 and 1740.

He died in Naples in 1755.
