= San Nicola Manfredi =

- Comune
- Comune di San Nicola Manfredi
- Location within Italy Location within Campania
- Coordinates: 41°4′N 14°49′E
- Country: Italy
- Region: Campania
- Province: Benevento (BN)

Government
  - Mayor: Fernando Errico

Area
  - Total: 18.9 km^{2} (7.3 sq mi)
- Elevation: 450 m (1,480 ft)

Population (1 January 2015)
  - Total: 3,716
  - Density: 197/km^{2} (509/sq mi)
- Demonym: Sannicolesi
- Time zone: UTC+1 (CET)
  - Summer (DST): UTC+2 (CEST)
- Postal code: 82010
- Dialing code: 0824

San Nicola Manfredi is a comune (municipality) in the Province of Benevento in the Italian region Campania, located about 50 km (31 mi) northeast of Naples and about 8 km (5.0 mi) southeast of Benevento.

San Nicola Manfredi borders the following municipalities: Benevento, Ceppaloni, Chianche, Montefusco, Paduli, Petruro Irpino, San Giorgio del Sannio, San Martino Sannita, Sant'Angelo a Cupolo, Torrioni.
