= Ceppaloni =

- Comune
- Comune di Ceppaloni
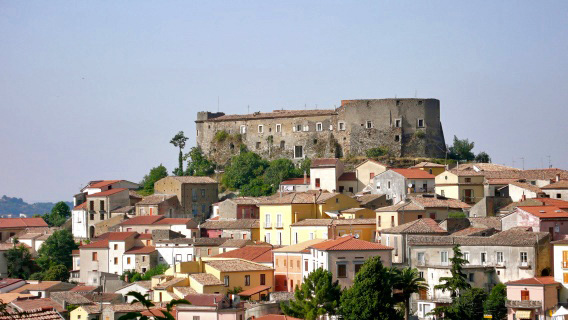
- The skyline of Ceppaloni and its castle

- Location within Italy Location within Campania
- Coordinates: 41°3′N 14°46′E
- Country: Italy
- Region: Campania
- Province: Benevento (BN)
- Frazioni: Barba, Beltiglio, Ripabianca, Tressanti, San Giovannii, Santa Croce, Rotola

Government
  - Mayor: Ettore Carmelo De Blasio

Area
  - Total: 23.7 km^{2} (9.2 sq mi)
- Elevation: 368 m (1,207 ft)

Population (1 January 2020)
  - Total: 3,252
  - Density: 137/km^{2} (355/sq mi)
- Demonym: Ceppalonesi
- Time zone: UTC+1 (CET)
  - Summer (DST): UTC+2 (CEST)
- Postal code: 82014
- Dialing code: 0824
- ISTAT code: 062022
- Patron saint: Nicholas of Bari
- Saint day: 6 December
- Website: Official website

Ceppaloni is a comune (municipality) in the Province of Benevento in the Italian region Campania, located about 50 km (31 mi) northeast of Naples and about 9 km (5.6 mi) south of Benevento.

Ceppaloni borders the following municipalities: Altavilla Irpina, Apollosa, Arpaise, Chianche, Montesarchio, Roccabascerana, San Leucio del Sannio, San Nicola Manfredi, Sant'Angelo a Cupolo.

Ceppaloni is the birthplace of politician Clemente Mastella.
