= Cardillo =

Cardillo is a surname of Sicilian origin, derived from the word cardillu, meaning goldfinch.

== People with the name ==
- Alex Cardillo (born 1997), Irish-Canadian actor
- Antonino Cardillo (born 1975), Italian architect
- Chad Cardillo, American politician
- Dom Cardillo (1930–2013), Canadian politician
- Edward Cardillo (born 1954), American politician
- Erin Cardillo (born 1977), American actress, producer, and writer
- Mark Cardillo, American scientist
- Rimer Cardillo (born 1944), Uruguayan artist
- Robert Cardillo (born 1961), American intelligence agency director
- Salvatore Cardillo (1874–1947), Italian-American composer

== See also ==
- Ruth Cardello, American author
