= San Giorgio del Sannio =

- Comune
- Comune di San Giorgio del Sannio
- Location within Italy Location within Campania
- Coordinates: 41°4′2.6″N 14°51′18.8″E
- Country: Italy
- Region: Campania
- Province: Province of Benevento (BN)

Area
  - Total: 22.3 km^{2} (8.6 sq mi)
- Elevation: 380 m (1,250 ft)

Population (Dec. 2004)
  - Total: 9,785
  - Density: 439/km^{2} (1,140/sq mi)
- Demonym: Sangiorgesi
- Time zone: UTC+1 (CET)
  - Summer (DST): UTC+2 (CEST)
- Postal code: 82018
- Dialing code: 0824

San Giorgio del Sannio (formerly San Giorgo alla Montagna or San Giorgio la Montagna) is a comune (municipality) in the Province of Benevento in the Italian region Campania, located about 60 km (37 mi) northeast of Naples and about 9 km (5.6 mi) southeast of Benevento. As of 31 December 2004, it had a population of 9,785 and an area of 22.3 km^{2} (8.6 sq mi).

San Giorgio del Sannio borders the following municipalities: Apice, Calvi, Paduli, San Martino Sannita, San Nazzaro, San Nicola Manfredi.

== Demographic evolution ==
Historical population

Year	Pop.	±%
1861	1,876	—
1871	2,263	+20.6%
1881	2,653	+17.2%
1901	3,508	+32.2%
1911	3,612	+3.0%

Year	Pop.	±%
1921	3,579	−0.9%
1931	4,158	+16.2%
1936	4,627	+11.3%
1951	5,359	+15.8%
1961	5,523	+3.1%

Year	Pop.	±%
1971	5,057	−8.4%
1981	6,158	+21.8%
1991	8,566	+39.1%
2001	9,505	+11.0%

Source: Data from ISTAT
