= Ruth Cardello =

American author of contemporary romance

- Born: Rhode Island
- Occupation: Novelist
- Writing career
- Period: 2011–present
- Genre: Romance
- Notable work: Maid for the Billionaire
- Website: ruthcardello.com

Ruth Cardello is an American author of contemporary romance. She is best known for her lighthearted billionaire romances, several of which have become New York Times and USA Today bestsellers.

== Biography ==
Cardello was the youngest of eleven children born to Joseph and Francois Labrecque in Rhode Island. She has worked as Kindergarten and English as a Second Language teacher for 20 years before becoming a full-time writer. She currently resides in Massachusetts with her husband and three children.

== Bibliography ==
=== The Legacy Collection ===
1. Maid for the Billionaire (Legacy Collection, #1). Ruth Cardello. September 2011 [2011].
2. For Love or Legacy (Legacy Collection, #2). Ruth Cardello. September 2011 [2011].
3. Bedding the Billionaire (Legacy Collection, #3). Ruth Cardello. November 2013 [2012].
4. Saving the Sheikh (Legacy Collection, #4). Ruth Cardello. September 2012 [2012].
5. Rise of the Billionaire (Legacy Collection, #5). Ruth Cardello. September 2013 [2013].
6. Breaching the Billionaire: Alethea's Redemption (Legacy Collection, #6). Ruth Cardello. September 2014 [2014].
7. A Corisi Christmas (Legacy Collection #7). Ruth Cardello. December 2014 [2014].

=== The Lone Star Burn Collection ===
1. Taken, Not Spurred (Lone Star Burn, #1). Montlake Romance. September 2014 [2014].
2. Tycoon Takedown (Lone Star Burn Book 2). Montlake Romance. March 2015 [2015].
3. Taken Home (Lone Star Burn Book 3). Montlake Romance. April 2016 [2016].
4. Taking Charge (Lone Star Burn Book 4). Montlake Romance. October 2016 [2016].

=== The Barrington Billionaires Collection ===
1. Always Mine (The Barrington Billionaires Book 1). RCardello LLC. November 2015 [2015].
2. Stolen Kisses (The Barrington Billionaires Book 2). RCardello LLC. February 2016 [2016].
3. Trade It All (The Barrington Billionaires Book 3). RCardello LLC. July 2016 [2016].
4. Let It Burn (The Barrington Billionaires Book 4). RCardello LLC. January 2017 [2017].
5. More Than Love (The Barrington Billionaires Book 5). RCardello LLC. August 2017 [2017].
