= Lattarico =

Lattarico Greek: Lattárioi
- Comune
- Comune di Lattarico
- Location within Italy Location within Calabria
- Coordinates: 39°28′N 16°8′E
- Country: Italy
- Region: Calabria
- Province: Cosenza (CS)
- Frazioni: Contessa Soprana, Cozzo Carbonaro, Palazzello, Piretto, Regina

Government
  - Mayor: Antonella Blandi

Area
  - Total: 42 km^{2} (16 sq mi)
- Elevation: 410 m (1,350 ft)

Population (40 April 2017)
  - Total: 3,982
  - Density: 95/km^{2} (250/sq mi)
- Demonym: Lattarichesi
- Time zone: UTC+1 (CET)
  - Summer (DST): UTC+2 (CEST)
- Postal code: 87010
- Dialing code: 0984
- Patron saint: Saint Nicholas of Bari
- Saint day: 6 December
- Website: Official website

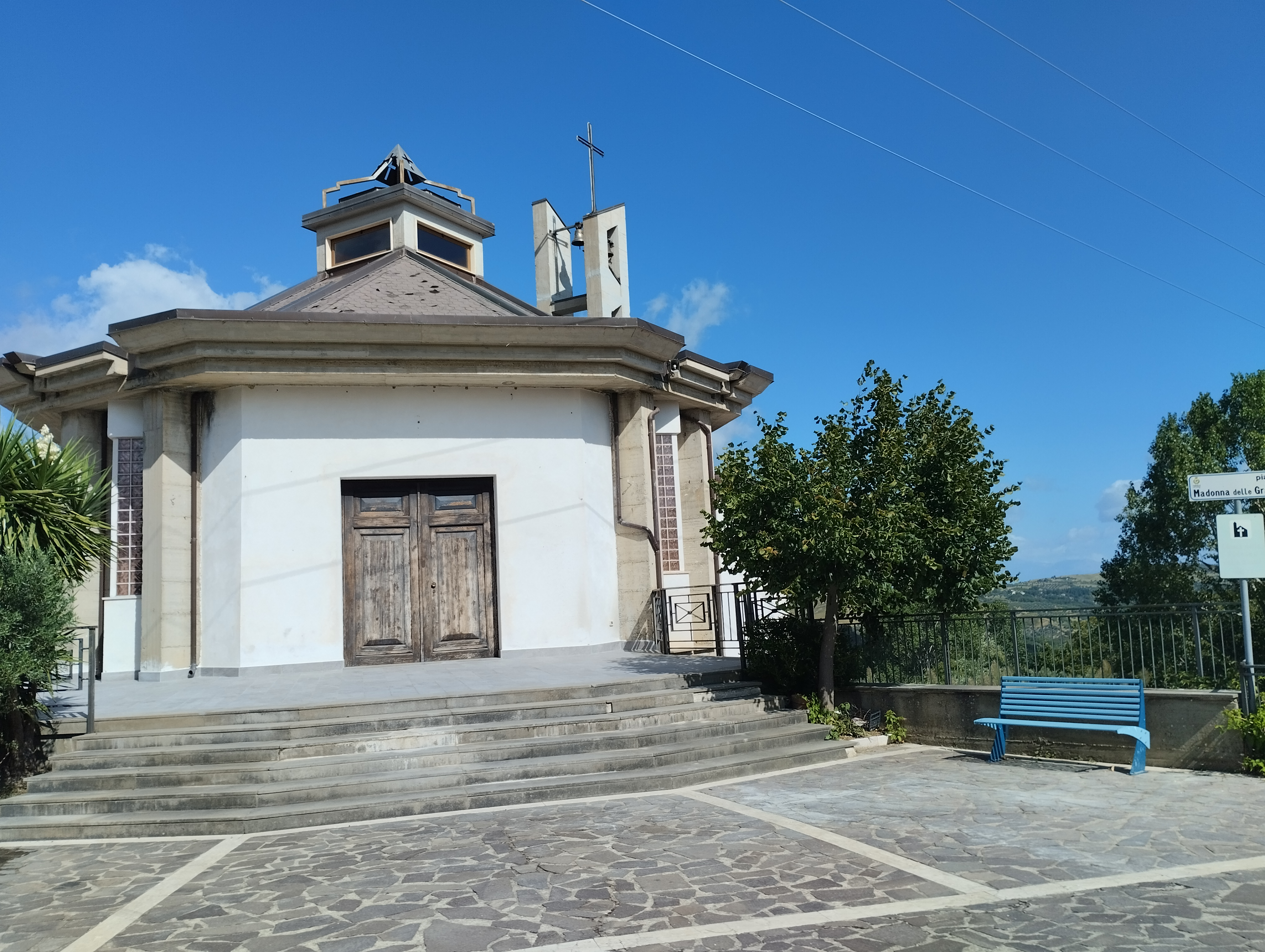
Church of Our Lady of Grace.

Lattarico (Greek: Lattarioi) is a town and comune in the province of Cosenza in the Calabria region of southern Italy.
