= San Leucio del Sannio =

- Comune
- Comune di San Leucio del Sannio
- Location within Italy Location within Campania
- Coordinates: 41°5′N 14°46′E
- Country: Italy
- Region: Campania
- Province: Province of Benevento (BN)

Area
  - Total: 10.0 km^{2} (3.9 sq mi)
- Elevation: 344 m (1,129 ft)

Population (December 2004)
  - Total: 3,269
  - Density: 327/km^{2} (847/sq mi)
- Time zone: UTC+1 (CET)
  - Summer (DST): UTC+2 (CEST)
- Postal code: 82010
- Dialing code: 0824

San Leucio del Sannio is a comune (municipality) in the Province of Benevento in the Italian region Campania, located about 50 km (31 mi) northeast of Naples and about 6 km (3.7 mi) south of Benevento. As of 31 December 2004, it had a population of 3,269 and an area of 10.0 km^{2} (3.9 sq mi).

San Leucio del Sannio borders the following municipalities: Apollosa, Benevento, Ceppaloni, Sant'Angelo a Cupolo.

== Demographic evolution ==
Historical population

Year	Pop.	±%
1861	2,529	—
1871	2,588	+2.3%
1881	2,766	+6.9%
1901	3,467	+25.3%
1911	3,450	−0.5%

Year	Pop.	±%
1921	3,552	+3.0%
1931	3,746	+5.5%
1936	3,940	+5.2%
1951	4,062	+3.1%
1961	3,526	−13.2%

Year	Pop.	±%
1971	3,112	−11.7%
1981	3,179	+2.2%
1991	3,307	+4.0%
2001	3,159	−4.5%

Source: Data from ISTAT
