= Apice =

- Comune
- Comune di Apice
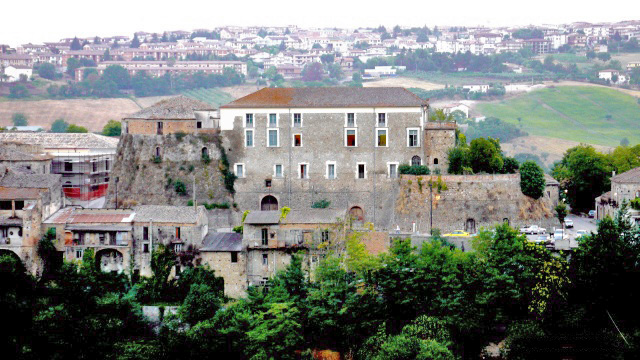

- Location within Italy Location within Campania
- Coordinates: 41°7′N 14°56′E
- Country: Italy
- Region: Campania
- Province: Province of Benevento (BN)
- Frazioni: San Donato, San Martino, Alvino, Santa Lucia, San Lorenzo, Morroni, San Teodoro, Raitelle, Giardinelli

Government
  - Mayor: Ida Antonietta Albanese

Area
  - Total: 49.04 km^{2} (18.93 sq mi)
- Elevation: 220 m (720 ft)

Population (1 January 2020)
  - Total: 5,504
  - Density: 112.2/km^{2} (290.7/sq mi)
- Demonyms: Apicesi, Apiciani, Apiciotti
- Time zone: UTC+1 (CET)
  - Summer (DST): UTC+2 (CEST)
- Postal code: 82021
- Dialing code: 0824
- ISTAT code: 062003
- Patron saint: John the Baptist; Saint Anthony
- Saint day: 24 June; 13 June
- Website: Official website

Apice is a comune (municipality) in the Province of Benevento in the Italian region Campania, located about 70 km (43 mi) northeast of Naples and about 13 km (8.1 mi) east of Benevento.

Apice borders the following municipalities: Ariano Irpino, Bonito, Buonalbergo, Calvi, Melito Irpino, Mirabella Eclano, Montecalvo Irpino, Paduli, San Giorgio del Sannio, Sant'Arcangelo Trimonte, Venticano.
