= Pietradefusi =

- Comune
- Comune di Pietradefusi
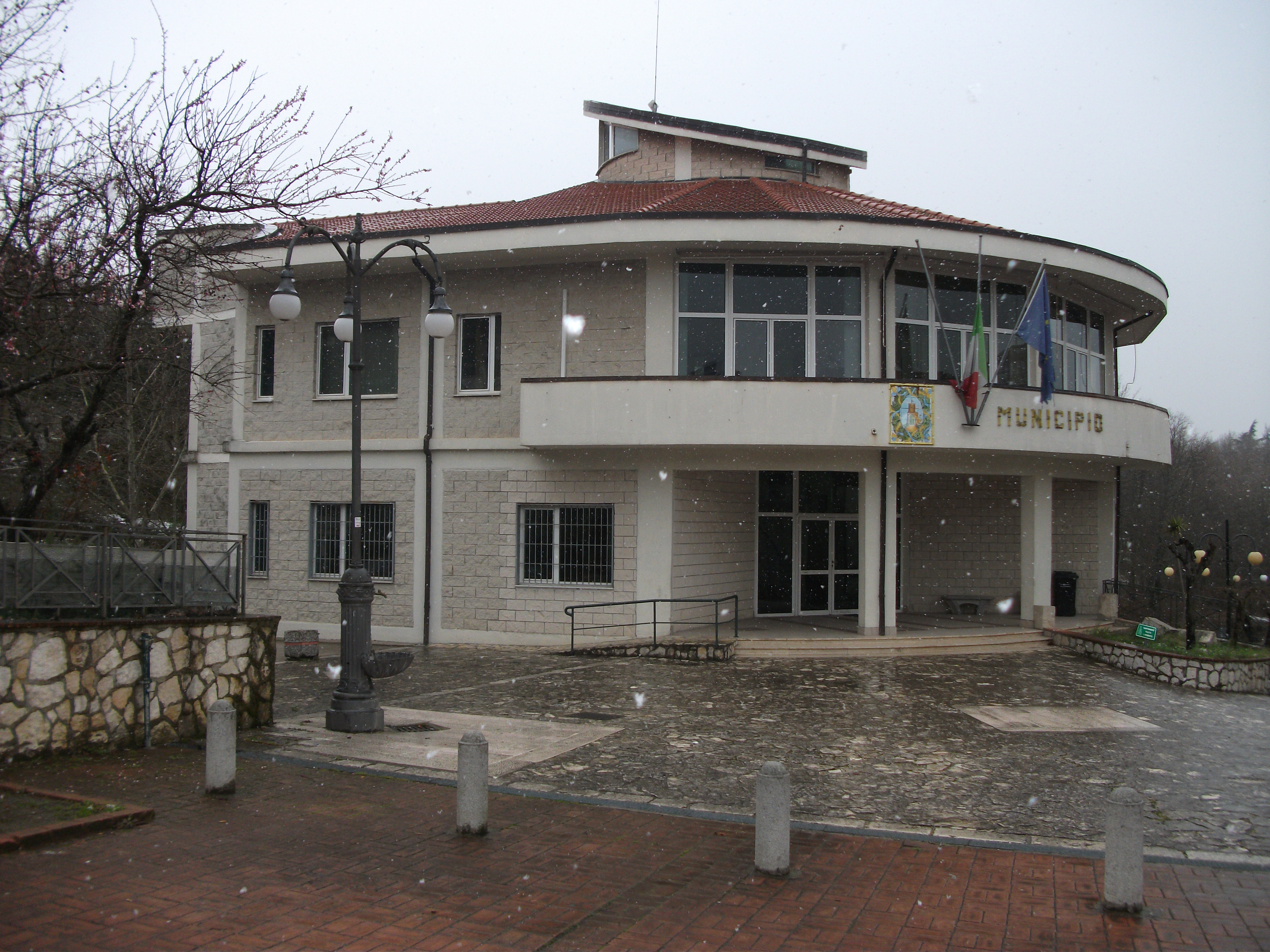
- Pietradefusi City Hall

- Location within Italy Location within Campania
- Coordinates: 41°03′N 14°53′E
- Country: Italy
- Region: Campania
- Province: Avellino (AV)
- Frazioni: Dentecane, Sant'Angelo a Cancelli, Sant'Elena Irpina, Pappaceci

Government
  - Mayor: Gaetano Musto

Area
  - Total: 9 km^{2} (3.5 sq mi)
- Elevation: 400 m (1,300 ft)

Population (1 January 2008)
  - Total: 2,524
  - Density: 280/km^{2} (730/sq mi)
- Time zone: UTC+1 (CET)
  - Summer (DST): UTC+2 (CEST)
- Postal code: 83030
- Dialing code: 0825
- Patron saint: San Faustino
- Website: Official website

Pietradefusi (Italian: [ˌpjɛ.tra.deˈfu.zi]; Irpino: 'A Preta) is a comune in the province of Avellino, Campania, Italy.

== History ==
According to some scholars, Pietradefusi lies on the site of the ancient Fusolae, a town cited by Livy as an ally of Hannibal during the Punic Wars, and which was later destroyed by the Romans.

The origins of the town are medieval (cited first from 1298) and it was fiefdom of many noble families such as the De Souzi, the De Tocco and the Acquaviva, but was also governed a long time by the Santa Casa dell'Annunziata of Naples. The Jesuits remember the town because one of their generals, Claudio of Aragona, was born here in the times of Francesco Borgia.

Cardinal Niccolò Coscia was born here, as was the father of Mario Puzo.

== Main sights and cultural events ==
- The Medieval Tower, located in the highest point of the town, was built in 1431 by Giacomo de Tocco. Around the Tower around the first dwellings rose.
- The church of Collegiata (1700). The facade is from 1596. Ruined during the French occupation in 1799, it was rebuilt in 1827.
- The church of St. Paulus (1800) situated in the center of Dentecane.

According to the tradition, the church of S. Apollinare and S. Spirito (no more existing) housed frescoes by Giotto.

Pietradefusi hosts is a Cinema Festival in September.
