= Torrioni =

- Comune
- Comune di Torrioni
- Location within Italy Location within Campania
- Coordinates: 41°2′N 14°49′E
- Country: Italy
- Region: Campania
- Province: Avellino (AV)
- Frazioni: Guardie, Casale Bosco

Government
  - Mayor: Annamaria Oliviero

Area
  - Total: 4 km^{2} (1.5 sq mi)
- Elevation: 645 m (2,116 ft)

Population (1 May 2009)
  - Total: 590
  - Density: 150/km^{2} (380/sq mi)
- Demonym: Torrionesi
- Time zone: UTC+1 (CET)
  - Summer (DST): UTC+2 (CEST)
- Postal code: 83010
- Dialing code: 0825
- ISTAT code: 064111
- Patron saint: San Michele Arcangelo
- Saint day: 29 September
- Website: Official website

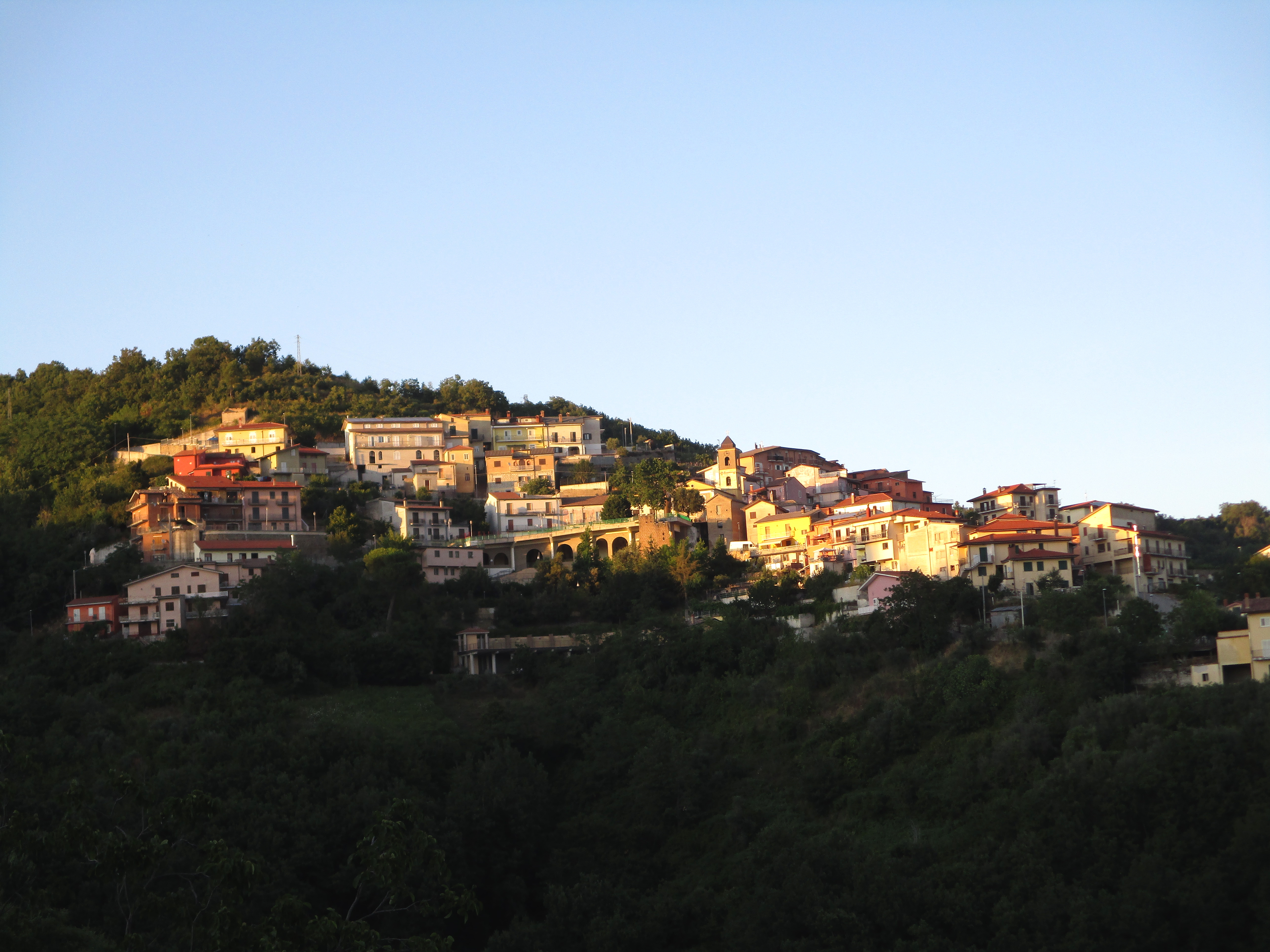
Torrioni town

Torrioni is a town and comune in the province of Avellino, Campania, Italy.
