= Chianche =

- Comune
- Comune di Chianche
- Location within Italy Location within Campania
- Coordinates: 41°03′N 14°47′E
- Country: Italy
- Region: Campania
- Province: Avellino (AV)
- Frazioni: Chianchetelle, San Pietro Irpino, Chianche scalo

Government
  - Mayor: Carlo Grillo

Area
  - Total: 6.81 km^{2} (2.63 sq mi)
- Elevation: 356 m (1,168 ft)

Population (31 December 2017)
  - Total: 487
  - Density: 71.5/km^{2} (185/sq mi)
- Demonym: Chianchesi
- Time zone: UTC+1 (CET)
  - Summer (DST): UTC+2 (CEST)
- Postal code: 83010
- Dialing code: 0825
- Patron saint: St. Felice of Nola
- Saint day: January 14
- Website: Official website

Chianche is a town and comune in province of Avellino, in the Campania region of Italy.

The town rises on the border between the provinces of Avellino and Benevento, on top of a green hill. It is surrounded by chestnut-tree woods, while the fertile countryside produces olive oil and the DOC wine "Greco di Tufo".

The town's history dates back from c. 300, when it was named Planca. It was ruled by many different feudal families, included the Caracciolo and Carafa.
