= Venticano =

- Comune
- Comune di Venticano
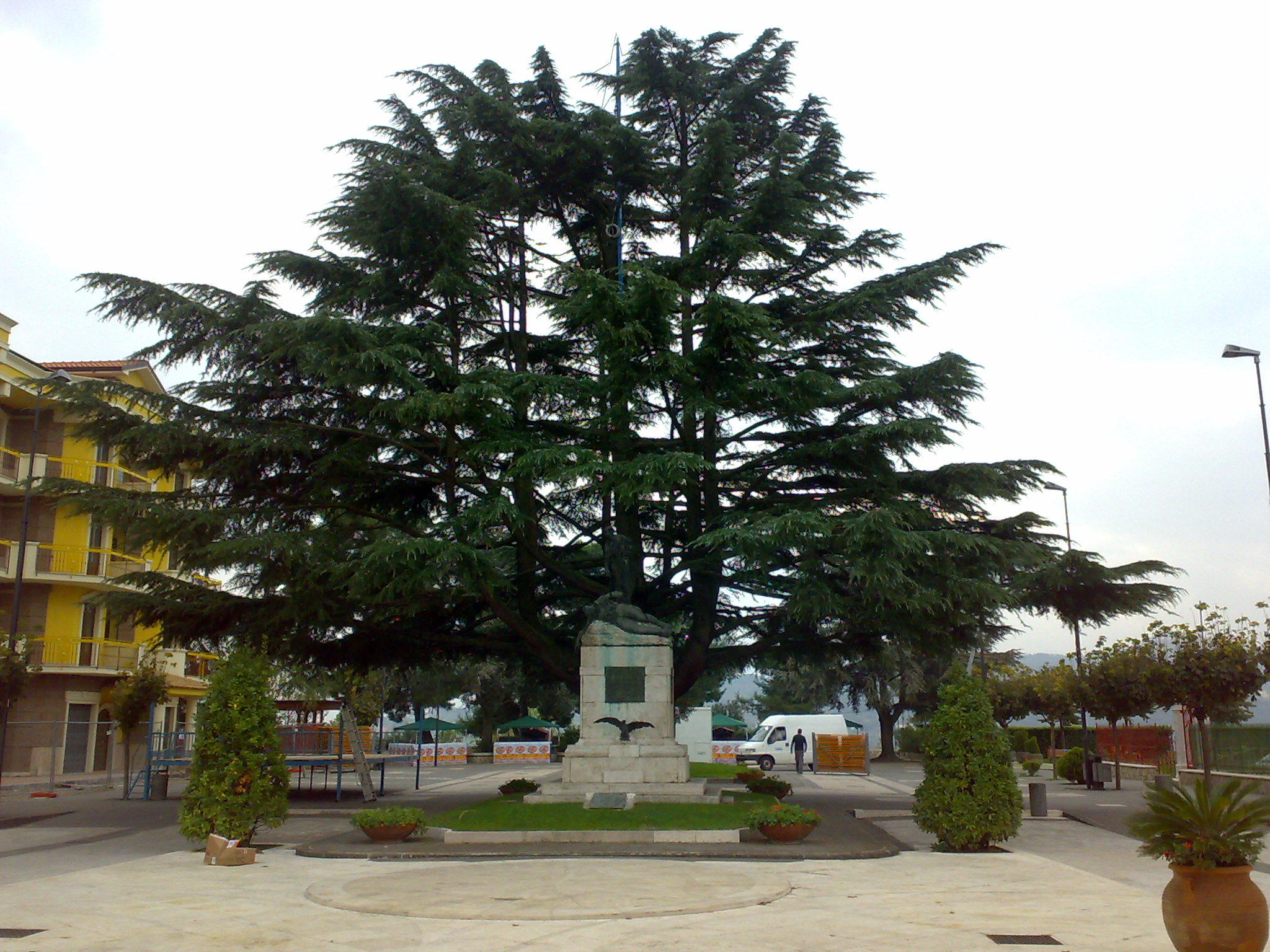
- War memorial in Venticano

- Coat of arms

- Location within Italy Location within Campania
- Coordinates: 41°3′N 14°55′E
- Country: Italy
- Region: Campania
- Province: Avellino (AV)
- Frazioni: Calore, Castello del Lago

Government
  - Mayor: Luigi De Nisco

Area
  - Total: 14.16 km^{2} (5.47 sq mi)
- Elevation: 375 m (1,230 ft)

Population (31 December 2017)
  - Total: 2,539
  - Density: 179.3/km^{2} (464.4/sq mi)
- Demonym: Venticanesi
- Time zone: UTC+1 (CET)
  - Summer (DST): UTC+2 (CEST)
- Postal code: 83030
- Dialing code: 0825
- Patron saint: St. Mary
- Saint day: 8 September
- Website: Official website

Venticano (Irpinian: Vinticano) is a town and comune in the province of Avellino, Campania, southern Italy.

== Twin towns ==
- Ferrara, Italy
