= List of municipalities of the Province of Caserta =

The following is a list of the 104 municipalities (comuni) of the Province of Caserta in the region of Campania in Italy.

== List ==
Municipality	Population (2026)	Area (km²)	Density
Ailano	1,127	16.06	70.2
Alife	7,249	64.32	112.7
Alvignano	4,433	38.13	116.3
Arienzo	5,399	14.01	385.4
Aversa	48,860	8.85	5,520.9
Baia e Latina	1,982	24.43	81.1
Bellona	6,055	11.78	514.0
Caianello	1,825	15.68	116.4
Caiazzo	5,077	37.04	137.1
Calvi Risorta	5,380	15.96	337.1
Camigliano	1,971	6.02	327.4
Cancello ed Arnone	5,783	49.30	117.3
Capodrise	10,003	3.46	2,891.0
Capriati a Volturno	1,381	18.39	75.1
Capua	18,017	48.60	370.7
Carinaro	7,182	6.32	1,136.4
Carinola	7,042	59.23	118.9
Casagiove	12,833	6.36	2,017.8
Casal di Principe	22,004	23.49	936.7
Casaluce	9,396	9.56	982.8
Casapesenna	7,427	3.05	2,435.1
Casapulla	8,264	2.90	2,849.7
Caserta	72,757	54.07	1,345.6
Castel Campagnano	1,415	17.48	80.9
Castel di Sasso	995	20.32	49.0
Castel Morrone	3,574	25.34	141.0
Castel Volturno	31,230	73.95	422.3
Castello del Matese	1,322	21.77	60.7
Cellole	8,292	36.79	225.4
Cervino	4,719	8.21	574.8
Cesa	9,848	2.74	3,594.2
Ciorlano	347	28.65	12.1
Conca della Campania	1,126	26.47	42.5
Curti	6,617	1.69	3,915.4
Dragoni	1,862	25.78	72.2
Falciano del Massico	3,429	46.72	73.4
Fontegreca	737	9.71	75.9
Formicola	1,393	15.68	88.8
Francolise	4,661	40.93	113.9
Frignano	8,974	9.86	910.1
Gallo Matese	439	31.13	14.1
Galluccio	1,987	32.11	61.9
Giano Vetusto	665	10.93	60.8
Gioia Sannitica	3,206	54.42	58.9
Grazzanise	6,805	47.05	144.6
Gricignano di Aversa	13,223	9.98	1,324.9
Letino	610	31.59	19.3
Liberi	1,008	17.59	57.3
Lusciano	16,371	4.56	3,590.1
Macerata Campania	10,072	7.63	1,320.1
Maddaloni	36,538	36.67	996.4
Marcianise	38,044	30.21	1,259.3
Marzano Appio	1,913	28.30	67.6
Mignano Monte Lungo	2,974	53.10	56.0
Mondragone	28,329	55.72	508.4
Orta di Atella	27,454	10.83	2,535.0
Parete	13,271	5.61	2,365.6
Pastorano	2,852	14.02	203.4
Piana di Monte Verna	2,074	23.50	88.3
Piedimonte Matese	9,988	41.43	241.1
Pietramelara	4,450	23.93	186.0
Pietravairano	2,782	33.49	83.1
Pignataro Maggiore	5,819	32.38	179.7
Pontelatone	1,520	32.25	47.1
Portico di Caserta	7,738	1.91	4,051.3
Prata Sannita	1,321	21.21	62.3
Pratella	1,324	33.74	39.2
Presenzano	1,608	31.89	50.4
Raviscanina	1,129	24.64	45.8
Recale	7,708	3.22	2,393.8
Riardo	2,170	16.48	131.7
Rocca d'Evandro	2,927	49.54	59.1
Roccamonfina	3,087	31.04	99.5
Roccaromana	843	27.71	30.4
Rocchetta e Croce	439	13.01	33.7
Ruviano	1,626	24.15	67.3
San Cipriano d'Aversa	13,496	6.22	2,169.8
San Felice a Cancello	16,810	27.18	618.5
San Gregorio Matese	842	56.51	14.9
San Marcellino	14,723	4.61	3,193.7
San Marco Evangelista	6,474	5.70	1,135.8
San Nicola la Strada	21,842	4.71	4,637.4
San Pietro Infine	775	13.72	56.5
San Potito Sannitico	1,947	23.13	84.2
San Prisco	12,094	7.79	1,552.5
San Tammaro	5,752	36.97	155.6
Sant'Angelo d'Alife	2,047	33.52	61.1
Sant'Arpino	15,567	3.20	4,864.7
Santa Maria a Vico	14,375	10.84	1,326.1
Santa Maria Capua Vetere	32,055	15.92	2,013.5
Santa Maria la Fossa	2,502	29.73	84.2
Sessa Aurunca	20,035	162.18	123.5
Sparanise	7,299	18.77	388.9
Succivo	8,918	7.21	1,236.9
Teano	10,951	89.43	122.5
Teverola	15,043	6.70	2,245.2
Tora e Piccilli	735	12.39	59.3
Trentola-Ducenta	20,897	6.66	3,137.7
Vairano Patenora	6,416	43.52	147.4
Valle Agricola	706	24.42	28.9
Valle di Maddaloni	2,573	10.90	236.1
Villa di Briano	7,562	8.55	884.4
Villa Literno	13,030	61.83	210.7
Vitulazio	7,725	22.97	336.3

== See also ==
- List of municipalities of Campania
- List of municipalities of Italy
