= List of municipalities of Campania =

Location of Campania within Italy

Provinces of Campania

The following is a list of the municipalities (comuni) of the region of Campania in Italy.

There are 550 municipalities in Campania as of 2026:

- 118 in the Province of Avellino
- 78 in the Province of Benevento
- 104 in the Province of Caserta
- 92 in the Metropolitan City of Naples
- 158 in the Province of Salerno

== List ==
Municipality	Province	Population (2026)	Area (km²)	Density
Acerno	Salerno	2,418	72.50	33.4
Acerra	Naples	58,585	54.71	1,070.8
Afragola	Naples	61,581	17.91	3,438.4
Agerola	Naples	7,844	19.83	395.6
Agropoli	Salerno	21,418	32.77	653.6
Aiello del Sabato	Avellino	4,045	10.87	372.1
Ailano	Caserta	1,127	16.06	70.2
Airola	Benevento	8,089	14.90	542.9
Albanella	Salerno	6,339	40.23	157.6
Alfano	Salerno	891	4.82	184.9
Alife	Caserta	7,249	64.32	112.7
Altavilla Irpina	Avellino	3,803	14.08	270.1
Altavilla Silentina	Salerno	7,058	52.48	134.5
Alvignano	Caserta	4,433	38.13	116.3
Amalfi	Salerno	4,572	5.70	802.1
Amorosi	Benevento	2,629	11.22	234.3
Anacapri	Naples	6,746	6.47	1,042.7
Andretta	Avellino	1,630	43.65	37.3
Angri	Salerno	34,353	13.77	2,494.8
Apice	Benevento	5,175	49.04	105.5
Apollosa	Benevento	2,419	21.12	114.5
Aquara	Salerno	1,237	32.73	37.8
Aquilonia	Avellino	1,381	56.15	24.6
Ariano Irpino	Avellino	20,657	186.74	110.6
Arienzo	Caserta	5,399	14.01	385.4
Arpaia	Benevento	1,983	4.96	399.8
Arpaise	Benevento	722	6.66	108.4
Arzano	Naples	31,613	4.71	6,711.9
Ascea	Salerno	5,914	37.45	157.9
Atena Lucana	Salerno	2,400	26.01	92.3
Atrani	Salerno	751	0.12	6,258.3
Atripalda	Avellino	10,182	8.59	1,185.3
Auletta	Salerno	2,106	35.68	59.0
Avella	Avellino	7,417	29.39	252.4
Avellino	Avellino	51,819	30.55	1,696.2
Aversa	Caserta	48,860	8.85	5,520.9
Bacoli	Naples	24,783	13.47	1,839.9
Bagnoli Irpino	Avellino	2,990	68.81	43.5
Baia e Latina	Caserta	1,982	24.43	81.1
Baiano	Avellino	4,371	12.30	355.4
Barano d'Ischia	Naples	9,953	10.96	908.1
Baronissi	Salerno	16,788	17.93	936.3
Baselice	Benevento	1,980	47.82	41.4
Battipaglia	Salerno	49,504	56.85	870.8
Bellizzi	Salerno	13,330	8.02	1,662.1
Bellona	Caserta	6,055	11.78	514.0
Bellosguardo	Salerno	639	16.75	38.1
Benevento	Benevento	55,330	130.84	422.9
Bisaccia	Avellino	3,424	102.16	33.5
Bonea	Benevento	1,336	11.46	116.6
Bonito	Avellino	2,169	18.78	115.5
Boscoreale	Naples	25,645	11.35	2,259.5
Boscotrecase	Naples	9,796	7.53	1,300.9
Bracigliano	Salerno	5,343	14.41	370.8
Brusciano	Naples	16,149	5.62	2,873.5
Bucciano	Benevento	1,950	7.94	245.6
Buccino	Salerno	4,462	65.92	67.7
Buonabitacolo	Salerno	2,454	15.54	157.9
Buonalbergo	Benevento	1,478	25.08	58.9
Caggiano	Salerno	2,486	35.43	70.2
Caianello	Caserta	1,825	15.68	116.4
Caiazzo	Caserta	5,077	37.04	137.1
Cairano	Avellino	281	13.81	20.3
Caivano	Naples	35,886	27.22	1,318.4
Calabritto	Avellino	2,096	56.33	37.2
Calitri	Avellino	4,090	101.06	40.5
Calvanico	Salerno	1,407	14.91	94.4
Calvi	Benevento	2,465	22.31	110.5
Calvi Risorta	Caserta	5,380	15.96	337.1
Calvizzano	Naples	12,869	4.01	3,209.2
Camerota	Salerno	6,741	70.58	95.5
Camigliano	Caserta	1,971	6.02	327.4
Campagna	Salerno	17,194	136.31	126.1
Campolattaro	Benevento	959	17.59	54.5
Campoli del Monte Taburno	Benevento	1,642	9.80	167.6
Campora	Salerno	297	29.15	10.2
Camposano	Naples	5,010	3.33	1,504.5
Cancello ed Arnone	Caserta	5,783	49.30	117.3
Candida	Avellino	1,083	5.35	202.4
Cannalonga	Salerno	939	17.75	52.9
Capaccio	Salerno	22,463	113.03	198.7
Capodrise	Caserta	10,003	3.46	2,891.0
Caposele	Avellino	3,185	41.28	77.2
Capri	Naples	6,705	4.06	1,651.5
Capriati a Volturno	Caserta	1,381	18.39	75.1
Capriglia Irpina	Avellino	2,184	7.49	291.6
Capua	Caserta	18,017	48.60	370.7
Carbonara di Nola	Naples	2,463	3.65	674.8
Cardito	Naples	21,434	3.21	6,677.3
Carife	Avellino	1,242	16.72	74.3
Carinaro	Caserta	7,182	6.32	1,136.4
Carinola	Caserta	7,042	59.23	118.9
Casagiove	Caserta	12,833	6.36	2,017.8
Casal di Principe	Caserta	22,004	23.49	936.7
Casal Velino	Salerno	5,368	31.71	169.3
Casalbore	Avellino	1,514	28.09	53.9
Casalbuono	Salerno	1,013	34.82	29.1
Casalduni	Benevento	1,176	23.34	50.4
Casaletto Spartano	Salerno	1,222	86.57	14.1
Casalnuovo di Napoli	Naples	46,663	7.83	5,959.5
Casaluce	Caserta	9,396	9.56	982.8
Casamarciano	Naples	2,990	6.38	468.7
Casamicciola Terme	Naples	7,361	5.85	1,258.3
Casandrino	Naples	13,055	3.19	4,092.5
Casapesenna	Caserta	7,427	3.05	2,435.1
Casapulla	Caserta	8,264	2.90	2,849.7
Casavatore	Naples	18,244	1.53	11,924.2
Caselle in Pittari	Salerno	1,860	45.56	40.8
Caserta	Caserta	72,757	54.07	1,345.6
Casola di Napoli	Naples	3,598	2.59	1,389.2
Casoria	Naples	73,257	12.13	6,039.3
Cassano Irpino	Avellino	959	13.07	73.4
Castel Baronia	Avellino	1,047	15.37	68.1
Castel Campagnano	Caserta	1,415	17.48	80.9
Castel di Sasso	Caserta	995	20.32	49.0
Castel Morrone	Caserta	3,574	25.34	141.0
Castel San Giorgio	Salerno	13,758	13.59	1,012.4
Castel San Lorenzo	Salerno	2,182	14.29	152.7
Castel Volturno	Caserta	31,230	73.95	422.3
Castelcivita	Salerno	1,370	57.64	23.8
Castelfranci	Avellino	1,666	11.69	142.5
Castelfranco in Miscano	Benevento	761	43.40	17.5
Castellabate	Salerno	8,672	37.43	231.7
Castellammare di Stabia	Naples	61,937	17.81	3,477.7
Castello del Matese	Caserta	1,322	21.77	60.7
Castello di Cisterna	Naples	7,855	3.92	2,003.8
Castelnuovo Cilento	Salerno	2,849	18.06	157.8
Castelnuovo di Conza	Salerno	557	14.06	39.6
Castelpagano	Benevento	1,317	38.26	34.4
Castelpoto	Benevento	1,093	11.78	92.8
Castelvenere	Benevento	2,367	15.44	153.3
Castelvetere in Val Fortore	Benevento	915	34.58	26.5
Castelvetere sul Calore	Avellino	1,454	17.17	84.7
Castiglione del Genovesi	Salerno	1,280	10.41	123.0
Cautano	Benevento	1,850	19.72	93.8
Cava de' Tirreni	Salerno	49,330	36.53	1,350.4
Celle di Bulgheria	Salerno	1,677	31.62	53.0
Cellole	Caserta	8,292	36.79	225.4
Centola	Salerno	5,020	47.75	105.1
Ceppaloni	Benevento	3,181	23.80	133.7
Ceraso	Salerno	2,195	46.46	47.2
Cercola	Naples	16,702	4.23	3,948.5
Cerreto Sannita	Benevento	3,498	33.35	104.9
Cervinara	Avellino	8,718	29.34	297.1
Cervino	Caserta	4,719	8.21	574.8
Cesa	Caserta	9,848	2.74	3,594.2
Cesinali	Avellino	2,512	3.73	673.5
Cetara	Salerno	1,886	4.97	379.5
Chianche	Avellino	458	6.61	69.3
Chiusano di San Domenico	Avellino	2,055	24.60	83.5
Cicciano	Naples	12,342	7.33	1,683.8
Cicerale	Salerno	1,178	41.37	28.5
Cimitile	Naples	6,907	2.74	2,520.8
Ciorlano	Caserta	347	28.65	12.1
Circello	Benevento	2,058	45.66	45.1
Colle Sannita	Benevento	2,155	37.28	57.8
Colliano	Salerno	3,387	55.16	61.4
Comiziano	Naples	1,665	2.45	679.6
Conca dei Marini	Salerno	635	1.13	561.9
Conca della Campania	Caserta	1,126	26.47	42.5
Contrada	Avellino	3,087	10.31	299.4
Controne	Salerno	757	7.75	97.7
Contursi Terme	Salerno	3,158	28.93	109.2
Conza della Campania	Avellino	1,269	51.64	24.6
Corbara	Salerno	2,518	6.73	374.1
Corleto Monforte	Salerno	462	58.97	7.8
Crispano	Naples	11,566	2.22	5,209.9
Cuccaro Vetere	Salerno	510	17.66	28.9
Curti	Caserta	6,617	1.69	3,915.4
Cusano Mutri	Benevento	3,733	58.86	63.4
Domicella	Avellino	1,794	6.40	280.3
Dragoni	Caserta	1,862	25.78	72.2
Dugenta	Benevento	2,627	16.05	163.7
Durazzano	Benevento	2,057	12.91	159.3
Eboli	Salerno	37,656	137.58	273.7
Ercolano	Naples	49,179	19.89	2,472.5
Faicchio	Benevento	3,161	43.99	71.9
Falciano del Massico	Caserta	3,429	46.72	73.4
Felitto	Salerno	1,140	41.53	27.5
Fisciano	Salerno	14,237	31.69	449.3
Flumeri	Avellino	2,462	34.55	71.3
Foglianise	Benevento	3,101	11.77	263.5
Foiano di Val Fortore	Benevento	1,301	41.31	31.5
Fontanarosa	Avellino	2,832	16.70	169.6
Fontegreca	Caserta	737	9.71	75.9
Forchia	Benevento	1,190	5.45	218.3
Forino	Avellino	5,218	20.39	255.9
Forio	Naples	17,464	13.08	1,335.2
Formicola	Caserta	1,393	15.68	88.8
Fragneto l'Abate	Benevento	893	20.57	43.4
Fragneto Monforte	Benevento	1,646	24.49	67.2
Francolise	Caserta	4,661	40.93	113.9
Frasso Telesino	Benevento	1,946	21.82	89.2
Frattamaggiore	Naples	28,677	5.37	5,340.2
Frattaminore	Naples	15,412	2.05	7,518.0
Frigento	Avellino	3,396	38.04	89.3
Frignano	Caserta	8,974	9.86	910.1
Furore	Salerno	678	1.88	360.6
Futani	Salerno	1,048	14.85	70.6
Gallo Matese	Caserta	439	31.13	14.1
Galluccio	Caserta	1,987	32.11	61.9
Gesualdo	Avellino	3,194	27.34	116.8
Giano Vetusto	Caserta	665	10.93	60.8
Giffoni Sei Casali	Salerno	4,951	35.08	141.1
Giffoni Valle Piana	Salerno	11,461	88.61	129.3
Ginestra degli Schiavoni	Benevento	378	14.79	25.6
Gioi	Salerno	1,058	27.99	37.8
Gioia Sannitica	Caserta	3,206	54.42	58.9
Giugliano in Campania	Naples	125,018	94.62	1,321.3
Giungano	Salerno	1,305	11.70	111.5
Gragnano	Naples	27,420	14.64	1,873.0
Grazzanise	Caserta	6,805	47.05	144.6
Greci	Avellino	594	30.27	19.6
Gricignano di Aversa	Caserta	13,223	9.98	1,324.9
Grottaminarda	Avellino	7,564	29.12	259.8
Grottolella	Avellino	1,811	7.13	254.0
Grumo Nevano	Naples	17,057	2.88	5,922.6
Guardia Lombardi	Avellino	1,446	55.87	25.9
Guardia Sanframondi	Benevento	4,465	21.10	211.6
Ischia	Naples	19,415	8.14	2,385.1
Ispani	Salerno	971	8.34	116.4
Lacco Ameno	Naples	4,469	2.08	2,148.6
Lacedonia	Avellino	2,011	82.10	24.5
Lapio	Avellino	1,421	15.25	93.2
Laureana Cilento	Salerno	1,255	13.74	91.3
Laurino	Salerno	1,200	70.46	17.0
Laurito	Salerno	647	20.22	32.0
Lauro	Avellino	3,243	11.29	287.2
Laviano	Salerno	1,261	55.68	22.6
Letino	Caserta	610	31.59	19.3
Lettere	Naples	6,019	12.02	500.7
Liberi	Caserta	1,008	17.59	57.3
Limatola	Benevento	4,220	18.38	229.6
Lioni	Avellino	5,862	46.51	126.0
Liveri	Naples	1,474	2.71	543.9
Luogosano	Avellino	1,062	6.07	175.0
Lusciano	Caserta	16,371	4.56	3,590.1
Lustra	Salerno	1,005	15.24	65.9
Macerata Campania	Caserta	10,072	7.63	1,320.1
Maddaloni	Caserta	36,538	36.67	996.4
Magliano Vetere	Salerno	573	23.30	24.6
Maiori	Salerno	5,211	16.67	312.6
Manocalzati	Avellino	2,991	8.75	341.8
Marano di Napoli	Naples	57,631	15.64	3,684.8
Marcianise	Caserta	38,044	30.21	1,259.3
Mariglianella	Naples	8,047	3.26	2,468.4
Marigliano	Naples	29,496	22.58	1,306.3
Marzano Appio	Caserta	1,913	28.30	67.6
Marzano di Nola	Avellino	1,656	4.72	350.8
Massa di Somma	Naples	4,933	3.04	1,622.7
Massa Lubrense	Naples	14,116	19.84	711.5
Melito di Napoli	Naples	36,156	3.81	9,489.8
Melito Irpino	Avellino	1,759	20.68	85.1
Melizzano	Benevento	1,636	17.59	93.0
Mercato San Severino	Salerno	21,309	30.33	702.6
Mercogliano	Avellino	11,416	19.92	573.1
Meta	Naples	7,855	2.25	3,491.1
Mignano Monte Lungo	Caserta	2,974	53.10	56.0
Minori	Salerno	2,528	2.66	950.4
Mirabella Eclano	Avellino	6,546	33.96	192.8
Moiano	Benevento	3,986	20.20	197.3
Moio della Civitella	Salerno	1,810	17.19	105.3
Molinara	Benevento	1,388	24.16	57.5
Mondragone	Caserta	28,329	55.72	508.4
Montaguto	Avellino	333	18.38	18.1
Montano Antilia	Salerno	1,644	33.44	49.2
Monte di Procida	Naples	11,735	3.70	3,171.6
Monte San Giacomo	Salerno	1,354	51.69	26.2
Montecalvo Irpino	Avellino	3,226	54.01	59.7
Montecorice	Salerno	2,592	22.25	116.5
Montecorvino Pugliano	Salerno	11,212	28.88	388.2
Montecorvino Rovella	Salerno	12,308	42.16	291.9
Montefalcione	Avellino	3,042	15.29	199.0
Montefalcone di Val Fortore	Benevento	1,260	41.94	30.0
Monteforte Cilento	Salerno	531	22.17	24.0
Monteforte Irpino	Avellino	11,352	26.96	421.1
Montefredane	Avellino	2,153	9.45	227.8
Montefusco	Avellino	1,183	8.24	143.6
Montella	Avellino	7,137	82.96	86.0
Montemarano	Avellino	2,520	34.01	74.1
Montemiletto	Avellino	5,013	21.64	231.7
Montesano sulla Marcellana	Salerno	6,281	110.22	57.0
Montesarchio	Benevento	12,969	26.51	489.2
Monteverde	Avellino	660	39.58	16.7
Montoro	Avellino	19,513	40.14	486.1
Morcone	Benevento	4,422	101.33	43.6
Morigerati	Salerno	577	21.19	27.2
Morra De Sanctis	Avellino	1,083	30.41	35.6
Moschiano	Avellino	1,535	13.45	114.1
Mugnano del Cardinale	Avellino	5,115	12.30	415.9
Mugnano di Napoli	Naples	35,506	5.25	6,763.0
Naples	Naples	905,050	119.02	7,604.2
Nocera Inferiore	Salerno	43,291	20.95	2,066.4
Nocera Superiore	Salerno	23,396	14.66	1,595.9
Nola	Naples	34,064	39.19	869.2
Novi Velia	Salerno	2,328	34.71	67.1
Nusco	Avellino	3,783	53.60	70.6
Ogliastro Cilento	Salerno	2,307	13.24	174.2
Olevano sul Tusciano	Salerno	6,571	26.72	245.9
Oliveto Citra	Salerno	3,601	31.62	113.9
Omignano	Salerno	1,636	10.10	162.0
Orria	Salerno	887	26.55	33.4
Orta di Atella	Caserta	27,454	10.83	2,535.0
Ospedaletto d'Alpinolo	Avellino	1,963	5.68	345.6
Ottati	Salerno	564	53.61	10.5
Ottaviano	Naples	23,364	20.02	1,167.0
Padula	Salerno	4,775	67.12	71.1
Paduli	Benevento	3,524	45.30	77.8
Pagani	Salerno	35,117	11.98	2,931.3
Pago del Vallo di Lauro	Avellino	1,684	4.63	363.7
Pago Veiano	Benevento	2,167	23.75	91.2
Palma Campania	Naples	16,254	20.67	786.4
Palomonte	Salerno	3,772	28.30	133.3
Pannarano	Benevento	1,962	11.80	166.3
Paolisi	Benevento	1,940	6.00	323.3
Parete	Caserta	13,271	5.61	2,365.6
Parolise	Avellino	612	3.22	190.1
Pastorano	Caserta	2,852	14.02	203.4
Paternopoli	Avellino	2,068	18.43	112.2
Paupisi	Benevento	1,381	6.83	202.2
Pellezzano	Salerno	10,824	14.04	770.9
Perdifumo	Salerno	1,802	23.81	75.7
Perito	Salerno	763	24.00	31.8
Pertosa	Salerno	632	6.16	102.6
Pesco Sannita	Benevento	1,798	24.15	74.5
Petina	Salerno	984	35.47	27.7
Petruro Irpino	Avellino	297	3.14	94.6
Piaggine	Salerno	1,056	62.77	16.8
Piana di Monte Verna	Caserta	2,074	23.50	88.3
Piano di Sorrento	Naples	12,136	7.34	1,653.4
Piedimonte Matese	Caserta	9,988	41.43	241.1
Pietradefusi	Avellino	1,919	9.24	207.7
Pietramelara	Caserta	4,450	23.93	186.0
Pietraroja	Benevento	493	35.81	13.8
Pietrastornina	Avellino	1,463	15.73	93.0
Pietravairano	Caserta	2,782	33.49	83.1
Pietrelcina	Benevento	2,869	28.25	101.6
Pignataro Maggiore	Caserta	5,819	32.38	179.7
Pimonte	Naples	5,883	12.54	469.1
Pisciotta	Salerno	2,416	31.24	77.3
Poggiomarino	Naples	22,803	13.20	1,727.5
Polla	Salerno	5,084	48.08	105.7
Pollena Trocchia	Naples	12,654	8.02	1,577.8
Pollica	Salerno	2,048	28.17	72.7
Pomigliano d'Arco	Naples	39,607	11.71	3,382.3
Pompei	Naples	23,517	12.42	1,893.5
Ponte	Benevento	2,388	17.92	133.3
Pontecagnano Faiano	Salerno	26,334	37.19	708.1
Pontelandolfo	Benevento	1,941	29.03	66.9
Pontelatone	Caserta	1,520	32.25	47.1
Portici	Naples	51,213	4.60	11,133.3
Portico di Caserta	Caserta	7,738	1.91	4,051.3
Positano	Salerno	3,643	8.65	421.2
Postiglione	Salerno	2,019	48.24	41.9
Pozzuoli	Naples	74,665	43.44	1,718.8
Praiano	Salerno	1,920	2.67	719.1
Prata di Principato Ultra	Avellino	2,655	10.99	241.6
Prata Sannita	Caserta	1,321	21.21	62.3
Pratella	Caserta	1,324	33.74	39.2
Pratola Serra	Avellino	3,561	8.84	402.8
Presenzano	Caserta	1,608	31.89	50.4
Prignano Cilento	Salerno	1,111	12.04	92.3
Procida	Naples	9,971	4.26	2,340.6
Puglianello	Benevento	1,262	8.76	144.1
Quadrelle	Avellino	1,864	6.93	269.0
Qualiano	Naples	24,799	7.43	3,337.7
Quarto	Naples	41,531	14.16	2,933.0
Quindici	Avellino	1,757	23.91	73.5
Ravello	Salerno	2,335	7.94	294.1
Raviscanina	Caserta	1,129	24.64	45.8
Recale	Caserta	7,708	3.22	2,393.8
Reino	Benevento	1,063	23.64	45.0
Riardo	Caserta	2,170	16.48	131.7
Ricigliano	Salerno	1,039	27.92	37.2
Rocca d'Evandro	Caserta	2,927	49.54	59.1
Rocca San Felice	Avellino	765	14.41	53.1
Roccabascerana	Avellino	2,343	12.46	188.0
Roccadaspide	Salerno	6,900	64.16	107.5
Roccagloriosa	Salerno	1,535	40.56	37.8
Roccamonfina	Caserta	3,087	31.04	99.5
Roccapiemonte	Salerno	8,676	5.31	1,633.9
Roccarainola	Naples	6,463	28.33	228.1
Roccaromana	Caserta	843	27.71	30.4
Rocchetta e Croce	Caserta	439	13.01	33.7
Rofrano	Salerno	1,222	63.59	19.2
Romagnano al Monte	Salerno	369	9.67	38.2
Roscigno	Salerno	570	15.18	37.5
Rotondi	Avellino	3,329	7.81	426.2
Rutino	Salerno	744	9.69	76.8
Ruviano	Caserta	1,626	24.15	67.3
Sacco	Salerno	394	23.66	16.7
Sala Consilina	Salerno	12,103	59.70	202.7
Salento	Salerno	1,734	23.79	72.9
Salerno	Salerno	125,323	59.85	2,094.0
Salvitelle	Salerno	457	9.60	47.6
Salza Irpina	Avellino	727	4.96	146.6
San Bartolomeo in Galdo	Benevento	4,191	82.67	50.7
San Cipriano d'Aversa	Caserta	13,496	6.22	2,169.8
San Cipriano Picentino	Salerno	6,738	17.39	387.5
San Felice a Cancello	Caserta	16,810	27.18	618.5
San Gennaro Vesuviano	Naples	12,164	7.01	1,735.2
San Giorgio a Cremano	Naples	41,585	4.11	10,118.0
San Giorgio del Sannio	Benevento	9,633	22.34	431.2
San Giorgio La Molara	Benevento	2,645	65.77	40.2
San Giovanni a Piro	Salerno	3,591	37.90	94.7
San Giuseppe Vesuviano	Naples	30,550	14.17	2,156.0
San Gregorio Magno	Salerno	3,798	50.05	75.9
San Gregorio Matese	Caserta	842	56.51	14.9
San Leucio del Sannio	Benevento	2,877	9.96	288.9
San Lorenzello	Benevento	2,079	13.88	149.8
San Lorenzo Maggiore	Benevento	1,855	16.30	113.8
San Lupo	Benevento	667	15.30	43.6
San Mango Piemonte	Salerno	2,616	6.02	434.6
San Mango sul Calore	Avellino	1,104	14.59	75.7
San Marcellino	Caserta	14,723	4.61	3,193.7
San Marco dei Cavoti	Benevento	2,895	49.19	58.9
San Marco Evangelista	Caserta	6,474	5.70	1,135.8
San Martino Sannita	Benevento	1,136	6.18	183.8
San Martino Valle Caudina	Avellino	4,733	22.92	206.5
San Marzano sul Sarno	Salerno	10,209	5.19	1,967.1
San Mauro Cilento	Salerno	824	15.28	53.9
San Mauro La Bruca	Salerno	500	19.05	26.2
San Michele di Serino	Avellino	2,391	4.47	534.9
San Nazzaro	Benevento	819	2.04	401.5
San Nicola Baronia	Avellino	737	6.90	106.8
San Nicola la Strada	Caserta	21,842	4.71	4,637.4
San Nicola Manfredi	Benevento	3,373	19.22	175.5
San Paolo Bel Sito	Naples	3,358	2.95	1,138.3
San Pietro al Tanagro	Salerno	1,699	15.51	109.5
San Pietro Infine	Caserta	775	13.72	56.5
San Potito Sannitico	Caserta	1,947	23.13	84.2
San Potito Ultra	Avellino	1,457	4.54	320.9
San Prisco	Caserta	12,094	7.79	1,552.5
San Rufo	Salerno	1,585	31.96	49.6
San Salvatore Telesino	Benevento	3,856	18.31	210.6
San Sebastiano al Vesuvio	Naples	8,571	2.65	3,234.3
San Sossio Baronia	Avellino	1,462	19.19	76.2
San Tammaro	Caserta	5,752	36.97	155.6
San Valentino Torio	Salerno	10,994	9.16	1,200.2
San Vitaliano	Naples	6,580	5.37	1,225.3
Sant'Agata de' Goti	Benevento	10,007	63.38	157.9
Sant'Agnello	Naples	8,425	4.15	2,030.1
Sant'Anastasia	Naples	25,999	18.74	1,387.4
Sant'Andrea di Conza	Avellino	1,341	7.05	190.2
Sant'Angelo a Cupolo	Benevento	3,989	11.01	362.3
Sant'Angelo a Fasanella	Salerno	498	32.61	15.3
Sant'Angelo a Scala	Avellino	672	10.75	62.5
Sant'Angelo all'Esca	Avellino	688	5.46	126.0
Sant'Angelo d'Alife	Caserta	2,047	33.52	61.1
Sant'Angelo dei Lombardi	Avellino	3,783	55.11	68.6
Sant'Antimo	Naples	32,516	5.90	5,511.2
Sant'Antonio Abate	Naples	18,766	7.93	2,366.5
Sant'Arcangelo Trimonte	Benevento	460	9.80	46.9
Sant'Arpino	Caserta	15,567	3.20	4,864.7
Sant'Arsenio	Salerno	2,639	20.14	131.0
Sant'Egidio del Monte Albino	Salerno	7,683	7.25	1,059.7
Santa Croce del Sannio	Benevento	857	16.24	52.8
Santa Lucia di Serino	Avellino	1,342	3.93	341.5
Santa Maria a Vico	Caserta	14,375	10.84	1,326.1
Santa Maria Capua Vetere	Caserta	32,055	15.92	2,013.5
Santa Maria la Carità	Naples	11,902	3.98	2,990.5
Santa Maria la Fossa	Caserta	2,502	29.73	84.2
Santa Marina	Salerno	3,220	28.36	113.5
Santa Paolina	Avellino	1,125	8.43	133.5
Santo Stefano del Sole	Avellino	2,046	10.78	189.8
Santomenna	Salerno	368	8.92	41.3
Sanza	Salerno	2,313	128.75	18.0
Sapri	Salerno	6,261	14.20	440.9
Sarno	Salerno	30,937	40.00	773.4
Sassano	Salerno	4,680	47.76	98.0
Sassinoro	Benevento	606	13.25	45.7
Saviano	Naples	16,063	13.88	1,157.3
Savignano Irpino	Avellino	1,010	38.47	26.3
Scafati	Salerno	47,574	19.90	2,390.7
Scala	Salerno	1,507	13.86	108.7
Scampitella	Avellino	981	15.11	64.9
Scisciano	Naples	6,371	5.50	1,158.4
Senerchia	Avellino	708	32.03	22.1
Serino	Avellino	6,563	52.50	125.0
Serramezzana	Salerno	272	7.23	37.6
Serrara Fontana	Naples	3,065	6.44	475.9
Serre	Salerno	3,671	67.03	54.8
Sessa Aurunca	Caserta	20,035	162.18	123.5
Sessa Cilento	Salerno	1,129	18.04	62.6
Siano	Salerno	9,226	8.57	1,076.5
Sicignano degli Alburni	Salerno	3,057	81.11	37.7
Sirignano	Avellino	2,941	6.19	475.1
Solofra	Avellino	11,921	22.21	536.7
Solopaca	Benevento	3,376	31.13	108.4
Somma Vesuviana	Naples	33,225	30.65	1,084.0
Sorbo Serpico	Avellino	512	8.10	63.2
Sorrento	Naples	14,949	9.96	1,500.9
Sparanise	Caserta	7,299	18.77	388.9
Sperone	Avellino	3,627	4.70	771.7
Stella Cilento	Salerno	612	14.52	42.1
Stio	Salerno	759	24.28	31.3
Striano	Naples	9,266	7.65	1,211.2
Sturno	Avellino	2,704	16.67	162.2
Succivo	Caserta	8,918	7.21	1,236.9
Summonte	Avellino	1,469	12.37	118.8
Taurano	Avellino	1,405	9.77	143.8
Taurasi	Avellino	2,056	14.41	142.7
Teano	Caserta	10,951	89.43	122.5
Teggiano	Salerno	6,967	61.87	112.6
Telese Terme	Benevento	7,607	10.00	760.7
Teora	Avellino	1,424	23.21	61.4
Terzigno	Naples	17,373	23.50	739.3
Teverola	Caserta	15,043	6.70	2,245.2
Tocco Caudio	Benevento	1,459	27.49	53.1
Tora e Piccilli	Caserta	735	12.39	59.3
Torchiara	Salerno	1,908	8.46	225.5
Torella dei Lombardi	Avellino	1,945	26.57	73.2
Torraca	Salerno	1,214	16.01	75.8
Torre Annunziata	Naples	39,496	7.54	5,238.2
Torre del Greco	Naples	78,839	30.63	2,573.9
Torre Le Nocelle	Avellino	1,223	10.04	121.8
Torre Orsaia	Salerno	1,928	21.03	91.7
Torrecuso	Benevento	3,224	29.16	110.6
Torrioni	Avellino	461	4.22	109.2
Tortorella	Salerno	462	34.22	13.5
Tramonti	Salerno	4,209	24.83	169.5
Trecase	Naples	8,522	6.21	1,372.3
Trentinara	Salerno	1,573	23.44	67.1
Trentola-Ducenta	Caserta	20,897	6.66	3,137.7
Trevico	Avellino	789	11.00	71.7
Tufino	Naples	3,350	5.21	643.0
Tufo	Avellino	757	5.96	127.0
Vairano Patenora	Caserta	6,416	43.52	147.4
Vallata	Avellino	2,405	47.91	50.2
Valle Agricola	Caserta	706	24.42	28.9
Valle dell'Angelo	Salerno	217	36.60	5.9
Valle di Maddaloni	Caserta	2,573	10.90	236.1
Vallesaccarda	Avellino	1,195	14.13	84.6
Vallo della Lucania	Salerno	7,779	25.32	307.2
Valva	Salerno	1,539	26.79	57.4
Venticano	Avellino	2,284	14.16	161.3
Vibonati	Salerno	3,235	20.54	157.5
Vico Equense	Naples	20,133	29.38	685.3
Vietri sul Mare	Salerno	6,878	9.52	722.5
Villa di Briano	Caserta	7,562	8.55	884.4
Villa Literno	Caserta	13,030	61.83	210.7
Villamaina	Avellino	896	9.04	99.1
Villanova del Battista	Avellino	1,439	20.00	72.0
Villaricca	Naples	31,482	6.88	4,575.9
Visciano	Naples	4,119	10.90	377.9
Vitulano	Benevento	2,662	35.99	74.0
Vitulazio	Caserta	7,725	22.97	336.3
Volla	Naples	25,921	6.20	4,180.8
Volturara Irpina	Avellino	2,878	32.42	88.8
Zungoli	Avellino	898	19.22	46.7

== See also ==
- List of municipalities of Italy
