= Naples metropolitan area =

Naples metropolitan area Area metropolitana di Napoli
- Metropolitan area
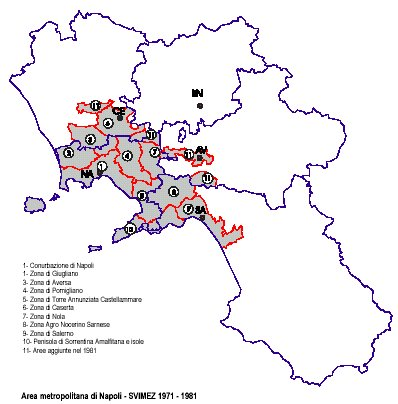
- Country: Italy
- Region: Campania
- Core city: Naples

Area
  - Metro: 2,300 km^{2} (890 sq mi)

Population
  - Metro: 4,250,000
- Time zone: UTC+1 (CET)
- GDP: 2005
- Nominal: $43 billion (only urban area)

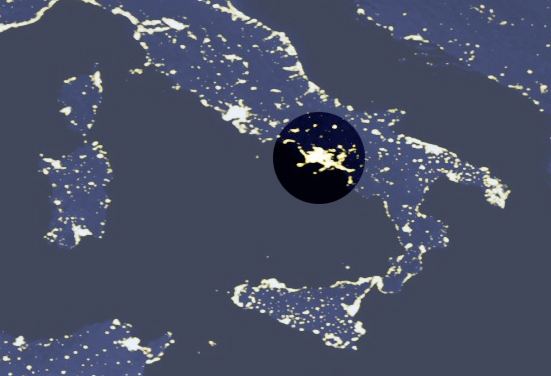
Satellite view.

The Naples metropolitan area (Italian: Area metropolitana di Napoli), or Greater Naples, is a metropolitan area in Campania, Italy, centered on the city of Naples.

== Overview ==
Naples urban area and metropolitan area is the second most populous in Italy, after Milan. According to European Spatial Planning Observation Network, in 2007 the Naples polycentric metropolitan area had a population of 3,714,000. More recent evaluations have put the population of the urban agglomeration encompassing Naples at between 3,700,000 and 5,000,000.

The SVIMEZ claims that the area has a population of 4,434,136 on area of 2300 km^{2}. The CENSIS put the population at 4,996,000. According to the ONU in 2010 the metropolitan area has a population of 5,000,000

This makes the area the 7th-most populous urban area in the European Union.

== Composition ==
The Naples metropolitan area includes the whole metropolitan city of Naples, 35 municipalities in province of Caserta, 10 municipalities in province of Avellino and 34 municipalities in province of Salerno, in all 171 municipalities, Naples metropolitan area - SVIMEZ the most important of these by population are Salerno, Giugliano in Campania, Torre del Greco, Pozzuoli, Casoria e Caserta, as shows the next table. In reality the metro area is much bigger, but political agreements were made that left it as is currently, and the real estimated population is about 6.8 million.

Area	Municipality	Area (in km^{2})	Population^{(2)(3)(4)}
Campania
Metropolitan City of Naples	Naples	117	969,061
Metropolitan City of Naples	Pozzuoli	43	83,156
Metropolitan City of Naples	Bacoli	13.3	27,273
Metropolitan City of Naples	Monte di Procida	3.6	13,273
Metropolitan City of Naples	Procida	4.1	10,629
Metropolitan City of Naples	Ischia	8	18,482
Metropolitan City of Naples	Barano d'Ischia	11	9,765
Metropolitan City of Naples	Casamicciola Terme	5	8,214
Metropolitan City of Naples	Forio	12	16,615
Metropolitan City of Naples	Lacco Ameno	2.7	4,623
Metropolitan City of Naples	Serrara Fontana	6	3,170
Metropolitan City of Naples	Capri	3	7,260
Metropolitan City of Naples	Anacapri	6.39	6,586
Metropolitan City of Naples	Sorrento	9	16,554
Metropolitan City of Naples	Massa Lubrense	19	13,772
Metropolitan City of Naples	Sant'Agnello	4	8,971
Metropolitan City of Naples	Vico Equense	29	20,764
Metropolitan City of Naples	Meta	2	7,925
Metropolitan City of Naples	Piano di Sorrento	7	13,014
Metropolitan City of Naples	Agerola	19.62	7,378
Metropolitan City of Naples	Quarto	14.2	39,348
Metropolitan City of Naples	Marano di Napoli	15.5	58,989
Metropolitan City of Naples	Qualiano	7.3	25,518
Metropolitan City of Naples	Calvizzano	3.9	12,543
Metropolitan City of Naples	Villaricca	6.8	29,565
Metropolitan City of Naples	Mugnano di Napoli	5.3	34,225
Metropolitan City of Naples	Arzano	4.7	36,823
Metropolitan City of Naples	Melito di Napoli	3.7	36,976
Metropolitan City of Naples	Giugliano in Campania	94	113,136
Metropolitan City of Naples	Sant'Antimo	5.8	31,150
Metropolitan City of Naples	Casandrino	3.2	13,391
Metropolitan City of Naples	Grumo Nevano	2.9	18,357
Metropolitan City of Naples	Frattamaggiore	5.0	30,772
Metropolitan City of Naples	Frattaminore	2.0	15,922
Metropolitan City of Naples	Crispano	2.3	12,642
Metropolitan City of Naples	Cardito	3.2	21,003
Metropolitan City of Naples	Caivano	27.1	36,956
Metropolitan City of Naples	Acerra	54.1	53,889
Metropolitan City of Naples	Afragola	18.0	63,828
Metropolitan City of Naples	Casoria	12.0	80,243
Metropolitan City of Naples	Casavatore	1.6	18,827
Metropolitan City of Naples	Casalnuovo di Napoli	7.8	50,633
Metropolitan City of Naples	Pomigliano d'Arco	11	39,378
Metropolitan City of Naples	Castello di Cisterna	4.0	6,927
Metropolitan City of Naples	Brusciano	5	15,804
Metropolitan City of Naples	Mariglianella	3.2	7,303
Metropolitan City of Naples	San Vitaliano	5.3	6,055
Metropolitan City of Naples	Marigliano	22	30,341
Metropolitan City of Naples	Scisciano	5.5	5,611
Metropolitan City of Naples	Saviano	13.8	15,260
Metropolitan City of Naples	Nola	39	32,736
Metropolitan City of Naples	Cimitile	2.7	6,975
Metropolitan City of Naples	Camposano	3.3	5,424
Metropolitan City of Naples	Cicciano	7.1	12,355
Metropolitan City of Naples	Comiziano	2.4	1,790
Metropolitan City of Naples	Casamarciano	6.3	3,361
Metropolitan City of Naples	San Paolo Bel Sito	3.0	3,462
Metropolitan City of Naples	Liveri	2.6	1,673
Metropolitan City of Naples	Visciano	10.9	4,613
Metropolitan City of Naples	Tufino	5.2	3,698
Metropolitan City of Naples	Roccarainola	28.1	7,270
Metropolitan City of Naples	Volla	6.2	23,302
Metropolitan City of Naples	Cercola	3.7	19,251
Metropolitan City of Naples	San Sebastiano al Vesuvio	2	9,664
Metropolitan City of Naples	San Giorgio a Cremano	4.1	47,437
Metropolitan City of Naples	Massa di Somma	3.5	5,837
Metropolitan City of Naples	Pollena Trocchia	8.1	13,715
Metropolitan City of Naples	Sant'Anastasia	18.8	28,951
Metropolitan City of Naples	Somma Vesuviana	30.7	34,612
Metropolitan City of Naples	Ottaviano	19.8	23,648
Metropolitan City of Naples	San Gennaro Vesuviano	7.0	10,818
Metropolitan City of Naples	Palma Campania	20.8	14,881
Metropolitan City of Naples	Carbonara di Nola	3.5	2,165
Metropolitan City of Naples	San Giuseppe Vesuviano	14.1	28,115
Metropolitan City of Naples	Striano	7.6	8,106
Metropolitan City of Naples	Poggiomarino	13.3	21,040
Metropolitan City of Naples	Terzigno	23.5	17,445
Metropolitan City of Naples	Portici	4.5	55,306
Metropolitan City of Naples	Ercolano	19	55,261
Metropolitan City of Naples	Torre del Greco	30	88,249
Metropolitan City of Naples	Trecase	6.1	9,264
Metropolitan City of Naples	Boscotrecase	7.5	10,555
Metropolitan City of Naples	Boscoreale	11.3	27,099
Metropolitan City of Naples	Torre Annunziata	7.0	46,592
Metropolitan City of Naples	Pompei	12	25,687
Metropolitan City of Naples	Santa Maria la Carità	3.9	11,484
Metropolitan City of Naples	Sant'Antonio Abate	7.9	19,428
Metropolitan City of Naples	Lettere	12.0	6,074
Metropolitan City of Naples	Casola di Napoli	2.6	3,780
Metropolitan City of Naples	Castellammare di Stabia	17	65,209
Metropolitan City of Naples	Gragnano	14.6	29,768
Metropolitan City of Naples	Pimonte	12.5	6,027
Province of Caserta	Villa Literno	61.7	10,949
Province of Caserta	Casal di Principe	23.4	20,746
Province of Caserta	San Cipriano d'Aversa	6.2	12,829
Province of Caserta	Casapesenna	3.0	6,587
Province of Caserta	Villa di Briano	8.5	6,028
Province of Caserta	Casaluce	9.4	10,247
Province of Caserta	Frignano	9.9	8,520
Province of Caserta	San Marcellino	4.6	12,499
Province of Caserta	Trentola-Ducenta	6.6	16,885
Province of Caserta	Aversa	8.7	52,242
Province of Caserta	Teverola	6.7	12,973
Province of Caserta	Carinaro	6.3	6,753
Province of Caserta	Gricignano di Aversa	9.8	9,809
Province of Caserta	Cesa	2.8	7,873
Province of Caserta	Sant'Arpino	3.2	14,057
Province of Caserta	Succivo	7.0	7,468
Province of Caserta	Orta di Atella	10.7	20,610
Province of Caserta	Marcianise	30	40,139
Province of Caserta	Capodrise	3.5	9,131
Province of Caserta	Portico di Caserta	1.8	7,535
Province of Caserta	Macerata Campania	7.6	10,649
Province of Caserta	Curti	1.7	7,131
Province of Caserta	San Tammaro	36.8	4,877
Province of Caserta	Santa Maria Capua Vetere	36	33,707
Province of Caserta	San Prisco	7.7	11,895
Province of Caserta	Casapulla	2.9	8,584
Province of Caserta	Casagiove	6.3	14,335
Province of Caserta	Caserta	53	78,843
Province of Caserta	San Nicola la Strada	4.7	20,732
Province of Caserta	San Marco Evangelista	5.5	6,100
Province of Caserta	Maddaloni	36	38,677
Province of Caserta	Recale	3	7,358
Province of Caserta	Lusciano	4	13,987
Province of Caserta	Parete	5.7	10,732
Province of Caserta	Villa di Briano	8	6,028
Province of Avellino	Mugnano del Cardinale	12	5,281
Province of Avellino	Avella	30.4	7,826
Province of Avellino	Baiano	12.3	4,754
Province of Avellino	Sperone	3	3,629
Province of Avellino	Rotondi	7	3,589
Province of Avellino	Sirignano	6	2,925
Province of Avellino	Quadrelle	6	1,941
Province of Avellino	Mercogliano	19.76	12,405
Province of Avellino	Avellino	30.41	57,054
Province of Avellino	Atripalda	8.53	11,160
Province of Salerno	Sarno	39	31,336
Province of Salerno	San Valentino Torio	9	9,941
Province of Salerno	San Marzano sul Sarno	5	9,923
Province of Salerno	Angri	13	31,333
Province of Salerno	Pagani	12.9	35,856
Province of Salerno	Nocera Inferiore	20	45,914
Province of Salerno	Nocera Superiore	14.7	23,967
Province of Salerno	Roccapiemonte	5.2	9,142
Province of Salerno	Castel San Giorgio	13	13,455
Province of Salerno	Siano	8	10,343
Province of Salerno	Mercato San Severino	30	21,292
Province of Salerno	Scafati	19.69	50,398
Province of Salerno	Cava de' Tirreni	36.46	53,405
Province of Salerno	Baronissi	17	16,592
Province of Salerno	Tramonti	24	4,139
Province of Salerno	Corbara	6.66	2,598
Province of Salerno	Sant'Egidio del Monte Albino	6	8,758
Province of Salerno	Vietri sul Mare	9	8,409
Province of Salerno	Cetara	4.91	2,370
Province of Salerno	Maiori	16	5,674
Province of Salerno	Ravello	7	2,500
Province of Salerno	Minori	2	2,875
Province of Salerno	Scala	13	1,538
Province of Salerno	Atrani	0.20	940
Province of Salerno	Amalfi	6	5,426
Province of Salerno	Conca dei Marini	1	739
Province of Salerno	Furore	1.73	827
Province of Salerno	Minori	2	2,875
Province of Salerno	Praiano	2	2,021
Province of Salerno	Positano	8	3,945
Province of Salerno	Salerno	58.96	140,434
Province of Salerno	Pontecagnano Faiano	36	24,862
Province of Salerno	Battipaglia	56.46	50,902
Province of Salerno	Bellizzi	7	12,997
TOTAL		2259.97	4,405,832

Naples metropolitan area - SVIMEZ

- ^{(2)} - it:Area metropolitana di Napoli
- ^{(3)} - ISTAT data
- ^{(4)} - es:Grande Napoli
