= Cancello e Arnone =

- Comune
- Comune di Cancello e Arnone
- Coat of arms

- Cancello Arnone within the Province of Caserta

- Location within Italy Location within Campania
- Coordinates: 41°4′N 14°1′E
- Country: Italy
- Region: Campania
- Province: Caserta (CE)

Government
  - Mayor: Pasqualino Emerito

Area
  - Total: 49.2 km^{2} (19.0 sq mi)
- Elevation: 8 m (26 ft)

Population (31 December 2010)
  - Total: 5,371
  - Density: 109/km^{2} (283/sq mi)
- Demonym(s): Cancellesi and Arnonesi
- Time zone: UTC+1 (CET)
  - Summer (DST): UTC+2 (CEST)
- Postal code: 88060
- Dialing code: 0823
- Website: Official website

Cancello e Arnone (also spelled Cancello ed Arnone or Cancello Arnone) (Campanian: Cancielle or Cancielle Arnore) is a comune (municipality) in the Province of Caserta in the Italian region Campania, located about 35 kilometres (22 mi) northwest of Naples and about 25 kilometres (16 mi) west of Caserta.

== Geography ==
The municipality borders Casal di Principe, Castel Volturno, Falciano del Massico, Grazzanise, Mondragone and Villa Literno.

It has no hamlets (frazioni), and is composed by the former villages of Cancello and Arnone, merged in a single settlement.
