= Capodrise =

- Comune
- Comune di Capodrise
- Location within Italy Location within Campania
- Coordinates: 41°3′N 14°18′E
- Country: Italy
- Region: Campania
- Province: Caserta (CE)

Government
  - Mayor: Angelo Crescente

Area
  - Total: 3.5 km^{2} (1.4 sq mi)
- Elevation: 34 m (112 ft)

Population (31 May 2017)
  - Total: 10,129
  - Density: 2,900/km^{2} (7,500/sq mi)
- Demonym: Capodrisani
- Time zone: UTC+1 (CET)
  - Summer (DST): UTC+2 (CEST)
- Postal code: 81020
- Dialing code: 0823
- Website: Official website

Capodrise (Campanian: Caputrìsë) is a comune (municipality) in the Province of Caserta in the Italian region Campania, located about 25 kilometres (16 mi) north of Naples and about 3 kilometres (2 mi) southwest of Caserta.

Capodrise borders the following municipalities: Marcianise, Portico di Caserta, Recale, San Marco Evangelista, San Nicola la Strada. It forms a single conurbation together with Marcianise and Caserta itself.
