= The Return of the Prodigal Son (Preti, Capodimonte) =

Painting by Mattia Preti

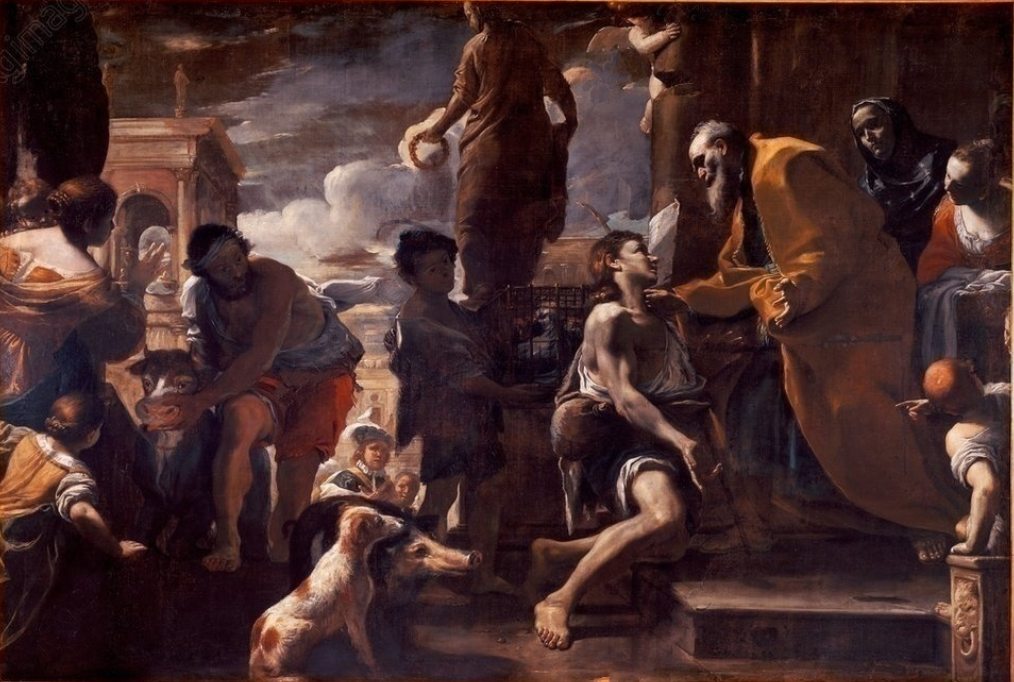
The Return of the Prodigal Son (1656) by Mattia Preti

The Return of the Prodigal Son is a 1656 oil on canvas painting by Mattia Preti, now in the Museo nazionale di Capodimonte in Naples.

== History ==
It originated in the collection of Diomede V Carafa, fifth Duke of Maddaloni, which also contained four other of Preti's works - Christ and the Canaanite Woman (now in Stoccarda), Christ Throwing Down Satan (also now in the Capodimonte), Christ Tempted by Satan (now in the Chiesa dell'Annunciata in Maddaloni) and Christ and the Centurion (now in Palermo). Historical records show Carafa paying Preti a sum equal to 220 ducats for five works. Christ Throwing Down Satan, Christ and the Centurion and Prodigal all entered the collection of Francesco Antonio Roberti, a civil judge in Naples, before being bought by the Bourbons for a total of 2,000 ducats.

== Bibliografia ==
- (in Italian) Nicola Spinosa, Mattia Preti. Tra Roma, Napoli e Malta, Napoli, Electa, 1999, ISBN 978-8851001292.
- (in Italian) N. Spinosa, Pittura del Seicento a Napoli - da Mattia Preti a Luca Giordano, natura in posa, Napoli, Arte'm, 2010.
