= Macerata (disambiguation) =

Macerata may refer to:

- Macerata, a city and comune in central Italy, the county seat of the province of Macerata in the Marche region
- Macerata Campania, a comune in the Province of Caserta in the Italian region Campania
- Macerata Feltria, is a comune in the Province of Pesaro e Urbino in the Italian region Marche
- 153rd Infantry Division Macerata, an infantry division of the Italian Army during World War II
- Macerata (volleyball), a professional volleyball team based in Treia, Italy
- Macerata (province), a province in the Marche region of Italy
