= Carinola =

- Comune
- Comune di Carinola
- Location within Italy Location within Campania
- Coordinates: 41°11′N 13°59′E
- Country: Italy
- Region: Campania
- Province: Province of Caserta (CE)
- Frazioni: San Ruosi, Ventaroli, San Donato, Casale di Carinola, Nocelleto, S. Croce, Croce di Casale, Casanova

Government
  - Mayor: Antonio Russo

Area
  - Total: 59.23 km^{2} (22.87 sq mi)
- Elevation: 71 m (233 ft)

Population (31 May 2017)
  - Total: 7,249
  - Density: 122.4/km^{2} (317.0/sq mi)
- Demonym: Carinolesi
- Time zone: UTC+1 (CET)
  - Summer (DST): UTC+2 (CEST)
- Postal code: 81030
- Dialing code: 0823
- Patron saint: Saint Bernard of Carinola & St. Martin of Mondragone
- Website: Official website

Carinola is a comune (municipality) in the Province of Caserta in the Italian region Campania, located c. 45 kilometres (28 mi) northwest of Naples, c. 30 kilometres (19 mi) northwest of Caserta, and c. 187 kilometres (116 mi) southeast of Rome.

Carinola borders the following municipalities: Falciano del Massico, Francolise, Sessa Aurunca, Teano.

== Etymology ==
There are multiple proposed etymological origins for Carinola. One posits the name derives from the Greek toponym Kalinium, the place where Carinola was founded. The second is that it derives from Calinolum, which comes from the Roman colony of Calenum. This explanation, as claimed by local historians Luca Menna and Salvatore Theo, would then be the basis for both the commune of Carinola and the nearby Calvi Risorta. In reality, Carinola most likely derives from Kalinium. The first mention of Calinolum being the root of Carinola is an error in transcription by Paolo Diacono, who should have transcribed the adjective Calenum, referring to Ancient Cales (today's Calvi Risorta), instead of the Lombard toponym Calinium, thus accidentally confusing the words and ending up with Calinolum. This seems to support the actual root of Carinola coming from the Greek toponym Kalinium.

== History ==
The town was founded by the Pelasgi as Urbana, at the confluence between the roads to Teano and Cascano. Later it was held by the Etruscans, as evidenced by surviving buildings, then by the Romans. In this time, it became an important centre. One historian writing in 1848 says:

"[...] it became a fortress, in the center of a vast valley, where the numerous inhabitants could live and prosper. It was under the rule of the Romans that Caleno or Calinum increased its prosperity and its notoriety, immediately becoming Municipium" it was "a city with its own government, laws, militias and magistrates. Pliny the younger, Stradone, Horace speak of Calenus [...] In Calinum the Romans, who often went to Naples and Cuma to question the Sibyl about the fate of the empire, found the tabernae deversoriae and the stabines"

After the fall of the Western Roman Empire, it was destroyed first by the Vandals led by Gaiseric in the 5th century, then by the Saracens in 750.

The arrival of the Saracens in the area in 750 coincides with the slow destruction of the city, which had already begun with the invasion of Gaiseric and led the population to take refuge in the site of Foro Claudio and in the surrounding hills (modern-day Casale, roughly the location of a summer palace built in the mid 10th century).

It was subsequently rebuilt as the modern Carinola on the nearby hills, becoming a bishopric seat in 1087. Subsequently, the city passed under the control of a Norman feudal lord, Count Riccardo, and became part of the Principality of Capua . In the surrounding countryside, many of the ruins of Urbana's houses were removed and reused in the construction of "fortress-farms". Next to these farms, the inhabitants began to build chapels and the two largest communities, those of San Pietro to the north-west and San Sisto to the south-east, built parishes. With the merger of the two communities in 1400 there was the birth of the hamlet of Nocelleto.

Further west of the urban center of Carinola, at the foot of a small hill of the Massica massif, the Grancelsa, the Borghi Lorenzi (today Laurenzi) and Carani developed in the late Middle Ages. The hamlet of Casanova would later follow the two small communities and develop into a properly medieval village. With a purely pastoral environment, its economy tied to winemaking, anchored to the cultural and religious traditions of devotion to the sacred temple of the hill dedicated to Maria SS. Grande and Eccelsa (hence Grancelsa).

In the 16th century the city declined due to adverse environmental conditions. In fact, in the vicinity of the inhabited centers there were many marshes and rivers full of weeds, which brought diseases such as typhus and cholera, decimating the population. In 1818 the diocese of Carinola was suppressed and its territory was united with that of the diocese of Sessa Aurunca.

For the facts following the German occupation of 1943, Carinola was awarded the silver medal for Civil Merit in 2004. It was in fact, as can also be read in the motivation for the award, a "strategically important centre": the town was the seat of the Deutsch Ortskommandantur, part of the Massico-Trigno Line, which in turn supported the better known Gustav. Historical testimony, in the sign of the suffering of deportation, of the illustrious citizen of Carlino Antonio Zannini, teacher and former social-democratic manager, who died in 2012. The anniversary of 28 October is particularly felt: in Borgo Laurenzi (fraction of Casanova) they were killed by mortar bodies fired by the Nazis - stationed on nearby Grancelsa - as many as thirteen civilians. Modern historical reconstructions actually date the nefarious event to 1 November, the date of a documented clash between the Allied forces and the German army, limited to the centers of S. Croce and Carinola.

== Geography ==
Carinola has an area of 59.23 km ^{2}, mostly occupied by cultivated land and woods. Developed in the northern part of the region, in the ancient territory of Campania Felix, Carinola is the cradle of Ager Falernus, the fertile area which has produced Falerno, one of the many wine varieties enjoyed by the ancient Romans.

Central in the connection between the cities of Naples and Rome, it borders to the north with Sessa Aurunca, with Teano in the north-east, Francolise in the south-east, Falciano del Massico to the west (Which only split from the commune of Carinola in 1964), and to the south Mondragone, Cancello Arnone and Grazzanise. Urban areas are scattered around the titular capital area. The most populous fractions are Nocelleto, Casale di Carinola and Casanova, together with the capital Carinola, which however constitutes the smallest agglomeration among the major communities. Other hamlets are S. Donato, Ventaroli, S. Croce, Croce di Casale and Cascano di Carinola (Parco Libellula, Campo de' Felci). Characteristic villages, albeit sparsely populated, are S. Ruosi-Ceraldi, S. Anna, Borgo Migliozzi and Borgo Fava.

== Awards ==
Carinola was awarded the silver medal for Civil Merit in 2004, for its role as a "strategically important centre" during WWII: the town was the seat of the Deutsch Ortskommandantur, part of the Massico-Trigno Line, which in turn supported the better known Gustav line. Historical testimony, in the sign of the suffering of deportation, of the illustrious citizen of Carlino Antonio Zannini, teacher and former social-democratic manager, who died in 2012. The anniversary of 28 October is particularly felt: in Borgo Laurenzi (fraction of Casanova) as many as 13 citizens were killed by mortars fired by the Nazis, stationed on nearby Grancelsa. Modern historical reconstructions actually date the nefarious event to 1 November, the date of a documented clash between the Allied forces and the German army, limited to the centers of S. Croce and Carinola.
