= San Marco Evangelista =

- Comune
- Comune di San Marco Evangelista
- Coat of arms

- Location within Italy Location within Campania
- Coordinates: 41°2′N 14°20′E
- Country: Italy
- Region: Campania
- Province: Caserta (CE)

Government
  - Mayor: Gabriele Cicala

Area
  - Total: 5.7 km^{2} (2.2 sq mi)
- Elevation: 46 m (151 ft)

Population (31 March 2016)
  - Total: 6,526
  - Density: 1,100/km^{2} (3,000/sq mi)
- Demonym: Massariuoli
- Time zone: UTC+1 (CET)
  - Summer (DST): UTC+2 (CEST)
- Postal code: 81020
- Dialing code: 0823
- Website: Official website

San Marco Evangelista is a comune (municipality) in the Province of Caserta in the Italian region Campania, located about 25 kilometres (16 mi) northeast of Naples and about 4 kilometres (2 mi) south of Caserta.

San Marco Evangelista borders the following municipalities: Capodrise, Caserta, Maddaloni, Marcianise, San Nicola la Strada.
