= Pignataro Maggiore =

- Comune
- Comune di Pignataro Maggiore
- Coat of arms

- Location within Italy Location within Campania
- Coordinates: 41°12′N 14°10′E
- Country: Italy
- Region: Campania
- Province: Caserta (CE)

Government
  - Mayor: Pietro Natale

Area
  - Total: 31.7 km^{2} (12.2 sq mi)
- Elevation: 93 m (305 ft)

Population (1 January 2011)
  - Total: 6,281
  - Density: 198/km^{2} (513/sq mi)
- Demonym: Pignataresi
- Time zone: UTC+1 (CET)
  - Summer (DST): UTC+2 (CEST)
- Postal code: 81052
- Dialing code: 0823
- Website: Official website

Pignataro Maggiore is a comune (municipality) in the Province of Caserta in the Italian region Campania, located about 40 kilometres (25 mi) north of Naples and about 20 kilometres (12 mi) northwest of Caserta.

Pignataro Maggiore borders the following municipalities: Calvi Risorta, Francolise, Giano Vetusto, Grazzanise, Pastorano, Sparanise, Vitulazio.

== Twin towns ==
- Sault, France
