= Falerno del Massico =

Geographically protected Italian wine

Falerno del Massico is an Italian red wine of DOC produced in the province of Caserta in the region of Campania. It received DOC classification in 1989. Falerno is produced in the same region as the highly regarded falernian wine of ancient Rome. As of 2012, there are forty-four Falerno del Massico Wines produced in this DOC region.
