= Sparanise =

- Comune
- Comune di Sparanise
- Coat of arms

- Location within Italy Location within Campania
- Coordinates: 41°11′N 14°6′E
- Country: Italy
- Region: Campania
- Province: Caserta (CE)

Government
  - Mayor: Salvatore Martiello

Area
  - Total: 18.7 km^{2} (7.2 sq mi)

Population (31 December 2013)
  - Total: 7,486
  - Density: 400/km^{2} (1,040/sq mi)
- Demonym: Sparanisani
- Time zone: UTC+1 (CET)
  - Summer (DST): UTC+2 (CEST)
- Postal code: 81056
- Dialing code: 0823
- Patron saint: San Vitaliano

Sparanise is a comune (municipality) in the Province of Caserta in the Italian region Campania, located about 40 kilometres (25 mi) northwest of Naples and about 25 kilometres (16 mi) northwest of Caserta. Its surrounding communities are the villages of Francolise, Calvi Risorta, and Pignataro Maggiore.
