= Macerata Campania =

- Comune
- Comune di Macerata Campania
- Location within Italy Location within Campania
- Coordinates: 41°4′N 14°16′E
- Country: Italy
- Region: Campania
- Province: Caserta (CE)
- Frazioni: Caturano e Casalba

Government
  - Mayor: Stefano Antonio Cioffi

Area
  - Total: 7.63 km^{2} (2.95 sq mi)
- Elevation: 34 m (112 ft)

Population (30 September 2017)
  - Total: 10,500
  - Density: 1,380/km^{2} (3,560/sq mi)
- Demonym: Maceratesi
- Time zone: UTC+1 (CET)
  - Summer (DST): UTC+2 (CEST)
- Postal code: 81047
- Dialing code: 0823
- Website: Official website

Macerata Campania is a comune (municipality) in the Province of Caserta in the Italian region Campania, located about 25 kilometres (16 mi) north of Naples and about 6 kilometres (4 mi) west of Caserta.

Macerata Campania borders the following municipalities: Casagiove, Casapulla, Curti, Marcianise, Portico di Caserta, Recale, Santa Maria Capua Vetere.

== History ==
Its history is linked, for its origins, with the ancient city of Capua, corresponding to the current Santa Maria Capua Vetere, because it had been part of the latter for many centuries, until the year 841 (the year of the invasion of the Saracens, who destroyed ancient Capua). The population was dominated by Lombards, Normans, Swabians, Angevins and Aragonese. According to Francesco Granata the ancient city of Capua extended in a territory of about six miles and, in the 18th century, it was occupied by the hamlets of S. Maria Maggiore, S. Pietro in Corpo, Curti, Macerata and S. Andrea de' Lagni. Furthermore, near the chapel of the Blessed Virgin of Graces of Macerata Campania there was the ancient Porta Atellana of Capua from which the Via Atellana started, leading to the farmhouse of Macerata that linked ancient Capua with Atella.

== Coat of arms and banner ==
The Municipality of Macerata Campania has its own blue coat of arms, composed of a silver cow, fixed on the green plain, with a gold band. The municipal banner consists of a yellow cloth, richly decorated with silver embroidery, depicting the coat of arms, and at the centre there is the name of the municipality in silver. Both the coat of arms and the banner are defined in Article 4 of the municipal statute.
