= Monte Santa Croce =

Mountain in Italy

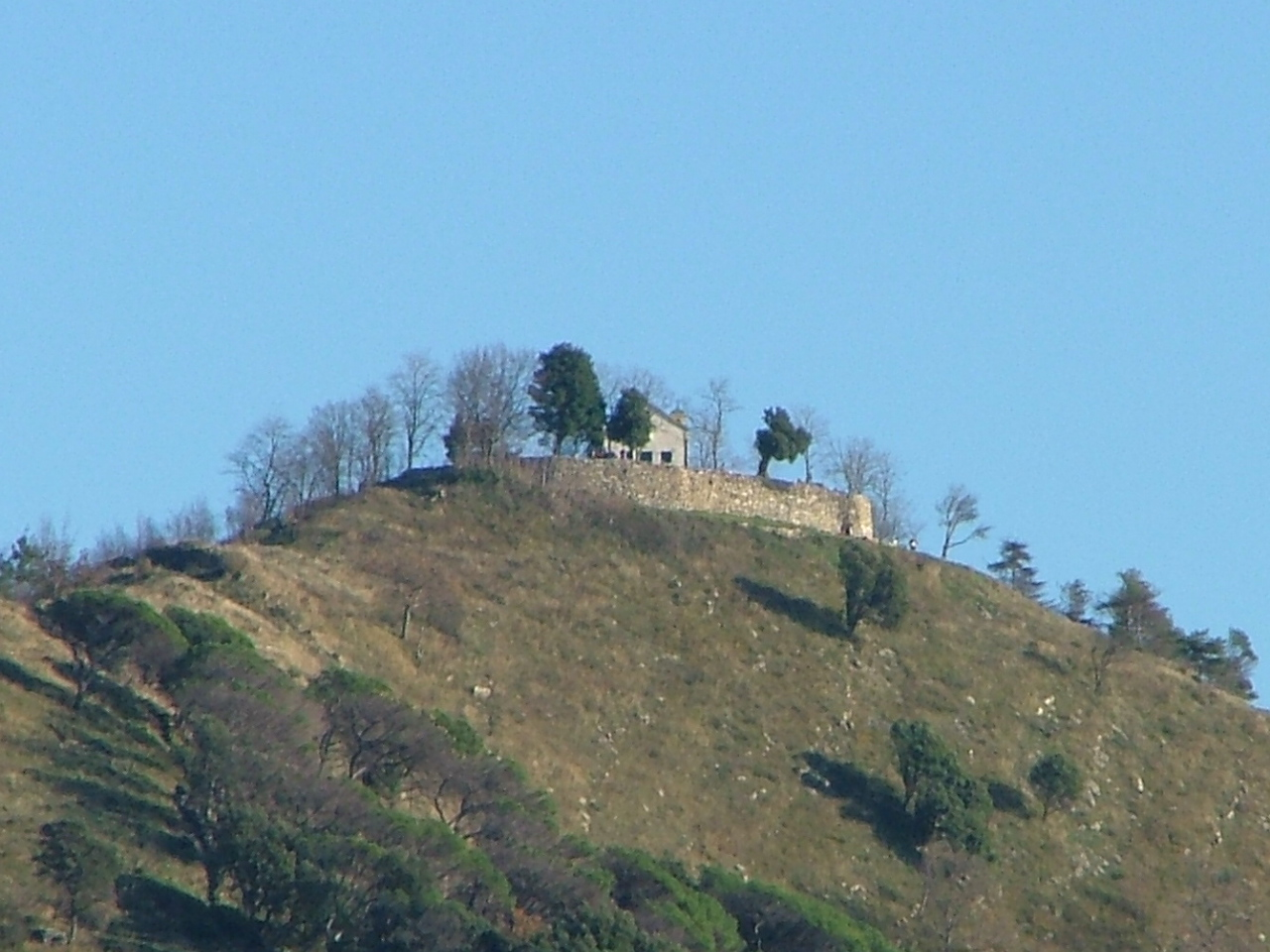

Highest point
- Elevation: 518 m (1,699 ft)
- Coordinates: 44°22′59″N 9°05′27″E

Geography
- Location within Italy
- Location: Liguria, Italy
- Parent range: Ligurian Apennines

Monte Santa Croce is a mountain in Liguria, northern Italy, part of the Ligurian Apennines.

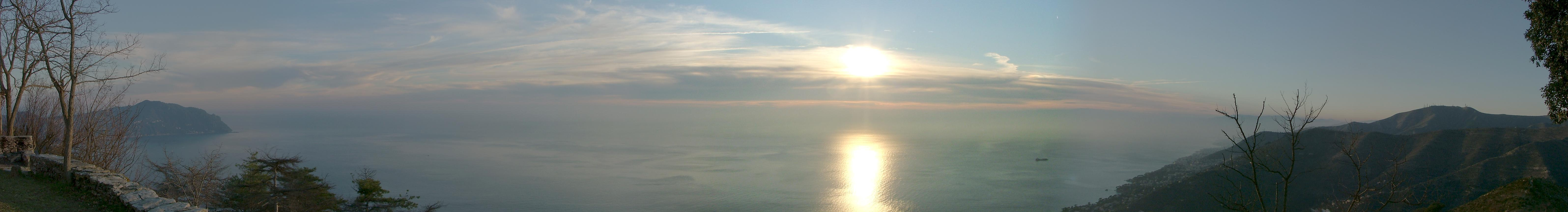
Panorama of Golfo Paradiso from the summit
