= Castello del Matese =

- Comune
- Comune di Castello del Matese
- Location within Italy Location within Campania
- Coordinates: 41°22′N 14°23′E
- Country: Italy
- Region: Campania
- Province: Caserta (CE)
- Frazioni: Miralago, Porchiera, San Marco, Campitello, Passo di Miralago, Grassete, Aritello, Piano degli Astori, Tagliaferro, Reale, Serra di Mezzo, Capo di Campo, Monte Porco

Government
  - Mayor: Antonio Montone Di Vittorio

Area
  - Total: 21.5 km^{2} (8.3 sq mi)
- Elevation: 476 m (1,562 ft)

Population (31 March 2017)
  - Total: 1,445
  - Density: 67.2/km^{2} (174/sq mi)
- Demonym: Castellani
- Time zone: UTC+1 (CET)
  - Summer (DST): UTC+2 (CEST)
- Postal code: 81010
- Dialing code: 0823
- Website: Official website

Castello del Matese (Campanian: Ncòppa Castièllë) is a comune (municipality) in the Province of Caserta in the Italian region Campania, located about 60 kilometres (37 mi) north of Naples and about 35 kilometres (22 mi) north of Caserta.

== Sports ==
=== Association football ===
Prima Categoria Molise (Group A) club A.S.D. Castello Matese play home matches at the Campo Sportivo Italo Pastore, a municipal stadium in Castello del Matese. The club was founded in 2017.
