= Province of Caserta =

Province of Italy

Coordinates: 41°10′N 14°13′E

Province of Caserta Provincia di Caserta (Italian) Pruvincia 'e Caserta (Neapolitan)
- Province
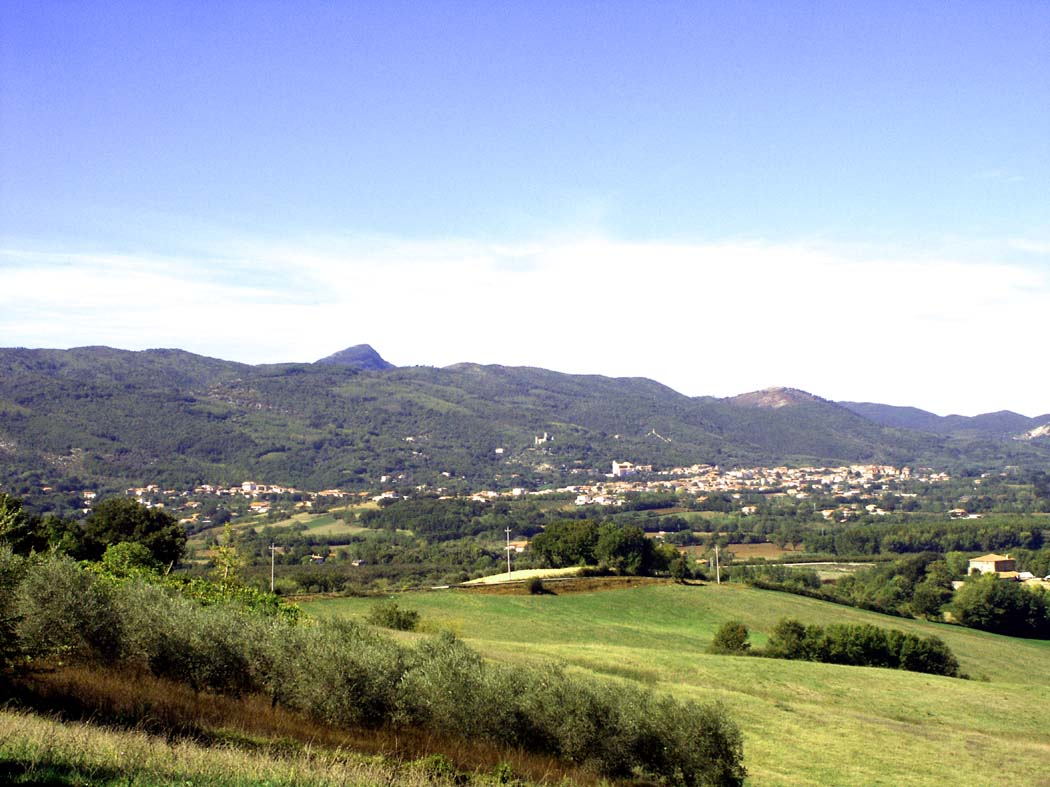
- Monti Trebulani

- Flag Coat of arms

- Location of the province of Caserta in Italy

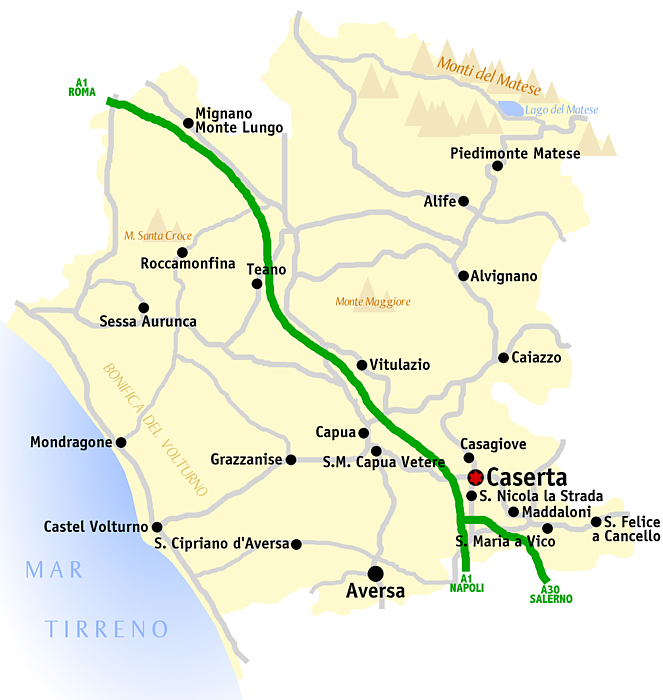
- Detailed map of the province of Caserta
- Country: Italy
- Region: Campania
- Capital(s): Caserta
- Municipalities: 104

Government
  - President: Anacleto Colombiano

Area
  - Total: 2,651.35 km^{2} (1,023.69 sq mi)

Population (2026)
  - Total: 909,493
  - Density: 343.030/km^{2} (888.444/sq mi)

GDP
  - Total: €14.536 billion (2015)
  - Per capita: €15,723 (2015)
- Time zone: UTC+1 (CET)
  - Summer (DST): UTC+2 (CEST)
- Postal code: 81100 Caserta, 81010-81059 other communes
- Telephone prefix: 081, 0823
- Vehicle registration: CE
- ISTAT code: 061

The Province of Caserta (Italian: provincia di Caserta, Neapolitan: Pruvincia 'e Caserta) is a province in the region of Campania in southern Italy. Its capital is the city of Caserta, situated about 36 kilometres (22 mi) by road north of Naples. The province has a population of 909,493 in an area of 2,651.35 square kilometres (1,023.69 sq mi) across its 104 municipalities.

The Palace of Caserta is located near to the city, a former royal residence which was constructed for the Bourbon kings of Naples. It was the largest palace and one of the largest buildings erected in Europe during the 18th century. In 1997, the palace was designated a World Heritage Site.

== History ==
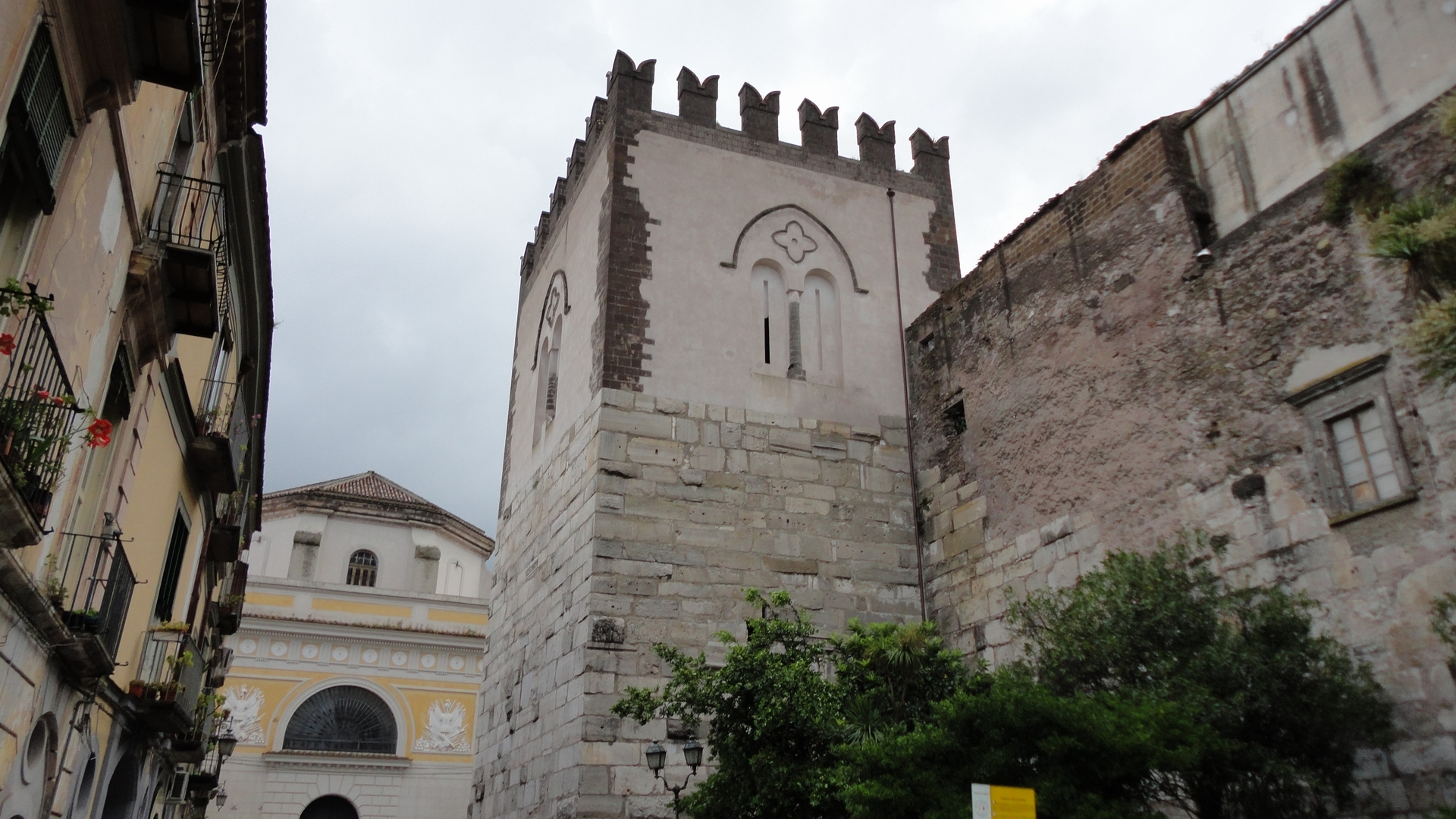
Castle of Capua

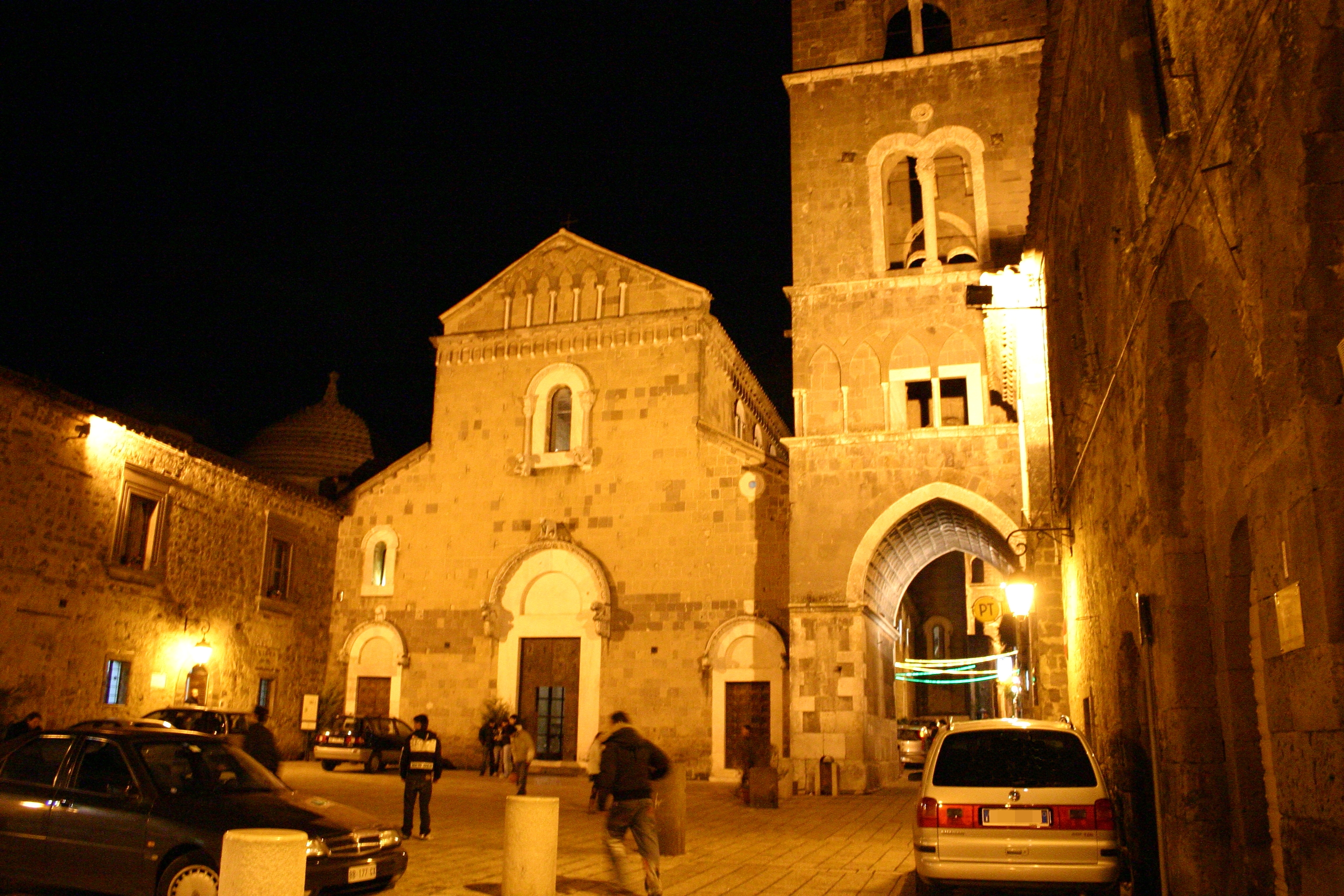
The Cathedral of Casertavecchia

The province of Caserta in the historical Terra di Lavoro region, also known as Liburia, covered the greatest expanse of territory around the 13th century when it extended from the Tyrrhenian Sea and the islands of Ponza and Ventotene to the Apennines and the southern end of the Roveto Valley. In the Kingdom of Naples and the Kingdom of the Two Sicilies, Caserta was one of the most important departments in southern Italy.

The first capital of the region was the ancient city of Capua until 1818, then Caserta. In addition to Naples, the most important centers were Caserta, Capua, Nola, Gaeta, Sora, Aversa, Teano, and Isola Liri. In 1816, during the French occupation, Joseph Bonaparte reformed the territorial division of the kingdom of Naples, on the basis of the French model. A series of royal decrees completed the reforms, introducing local administrative units or communes like the French ones. The new Napoleonic reforms led to the establishment of the province of Naples. In 1863, after the annexation of the Kingdom of Italy, the northeastern comuni (municipalities) of Terra di Lavoro became part of the province of Campobasso, and Venafro and the surrounding areas were later transferred to the province of Isernia, established in the 1870s. In 1927, Benito Mussolini decided to dissolve the province of Terra di Lavoro, uniting much of its territory and the Pontine Islands to the province of Naples, although municipalities near Piedimonte and Alife were distributed between the provinces of Benevento and Campobasso and the districts of Sora and Gaeta went to the province of Rome. In 1945, a Decree signed by Umberto di Savoia reconstituted the province of Caserta, and finally in 1970, the modern province came into being.

== Geography ==
The territory of the province of Caserta, which lies on the southwestern part of central Italy, is bordered to the north by the Matese mountains belonging to the Apennines and by undulating hills, and to the south and west by plains of various types. To the northeast, near the Matese mountains is the Lago del Matese. The highest point is Monte Miletto at 2,050 m (6,730 ft), divided between Campania and Molise. The karst massif is rich in water and minerals, and contains many caves and mountain lakes. Other mountainous areas of note include Monte Santa Croce, with the extinct volcano of Roccamonfina, on the border with Lazio, the Trebulani Mountains, in the central part of the province to the north including Monte Maggiore reaching 1,036 m (3,399 ft), and the Tifatini Mountains to the south. The Volturno River flows through the centre of the province with a defensive outpost at Capua. The southern highlands of Caserta border the province of Benevento.

== Municipalities ==
There are 104 municipalities in the province:

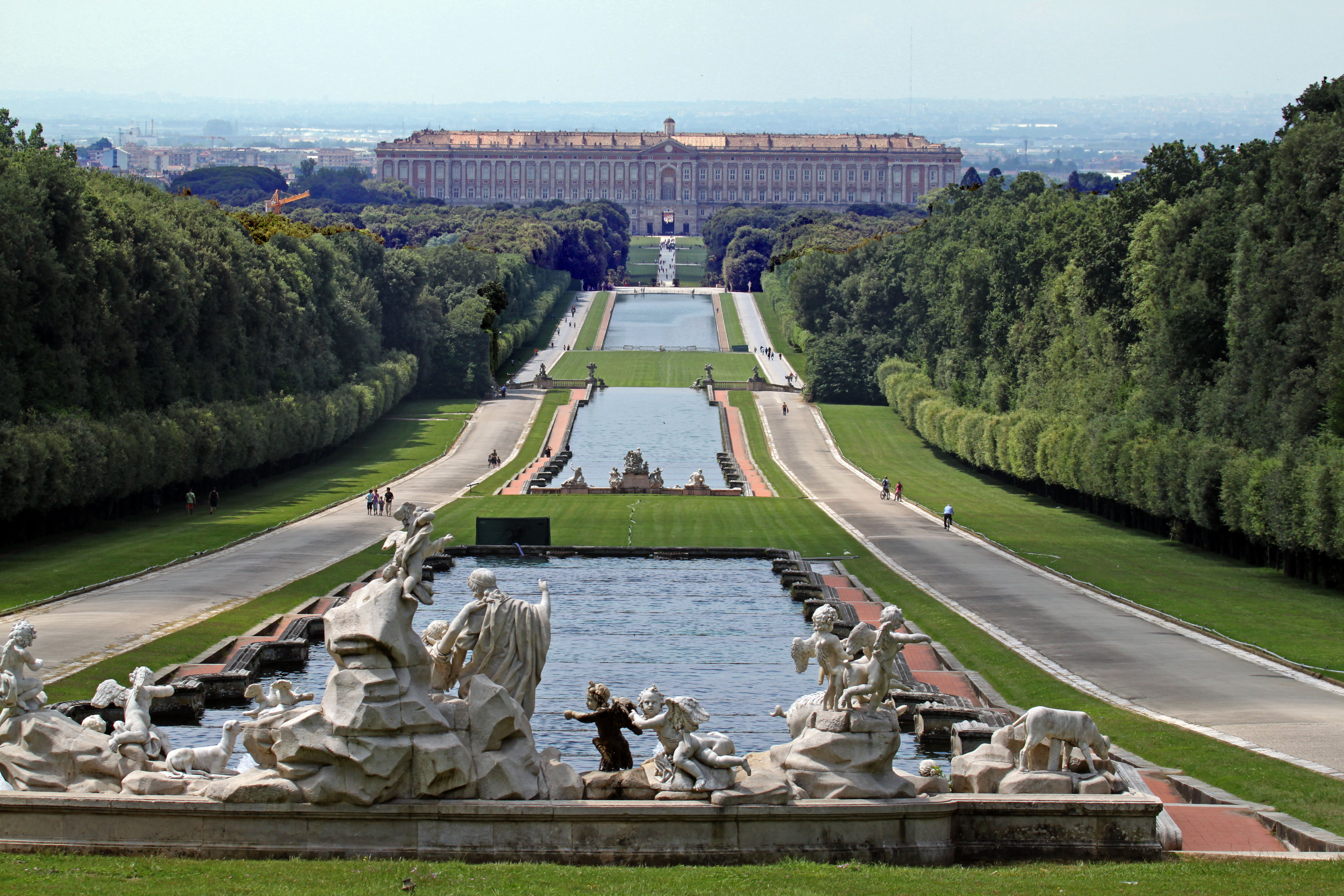
The Royal Palace of Caserta, the largest former royal residence in the world

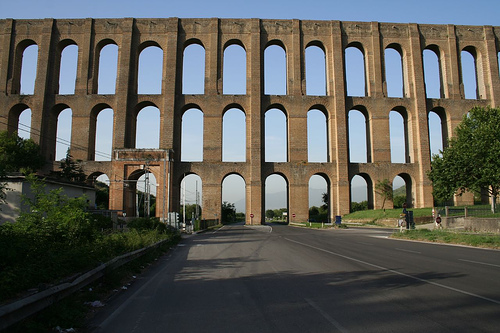
Aqueduct of Vanvitelli

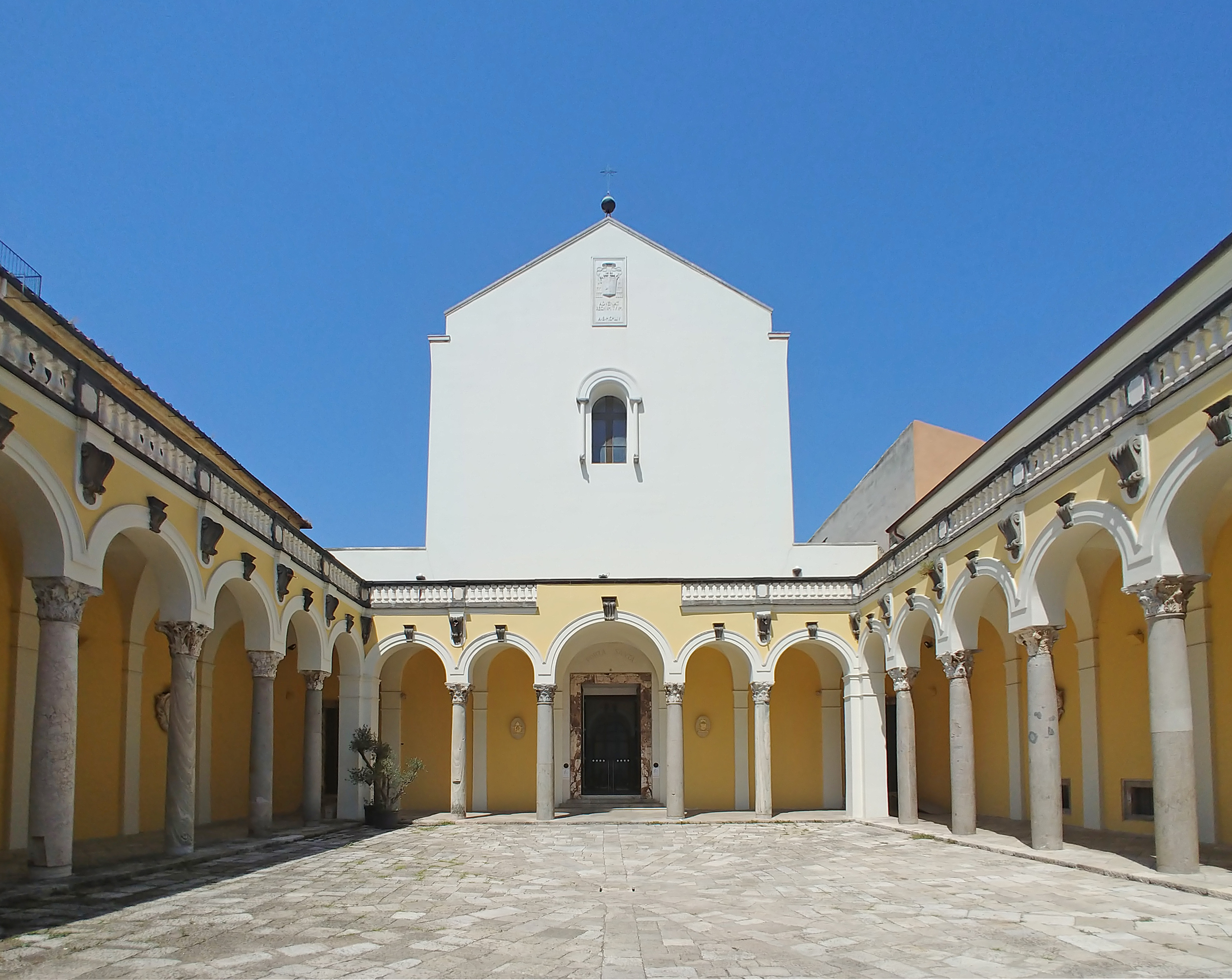
Capua Cathedral

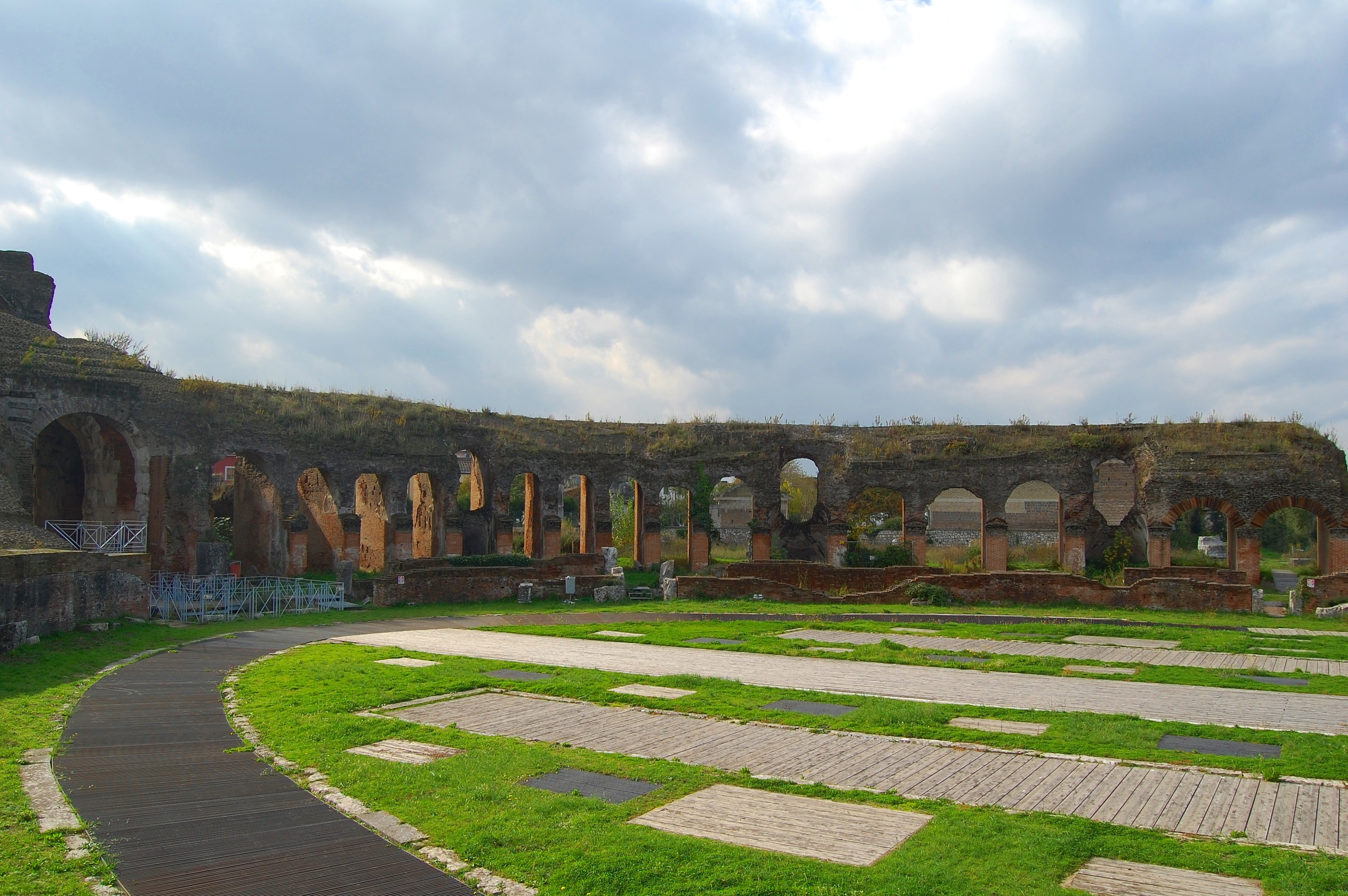
Amphitheatre of Capua

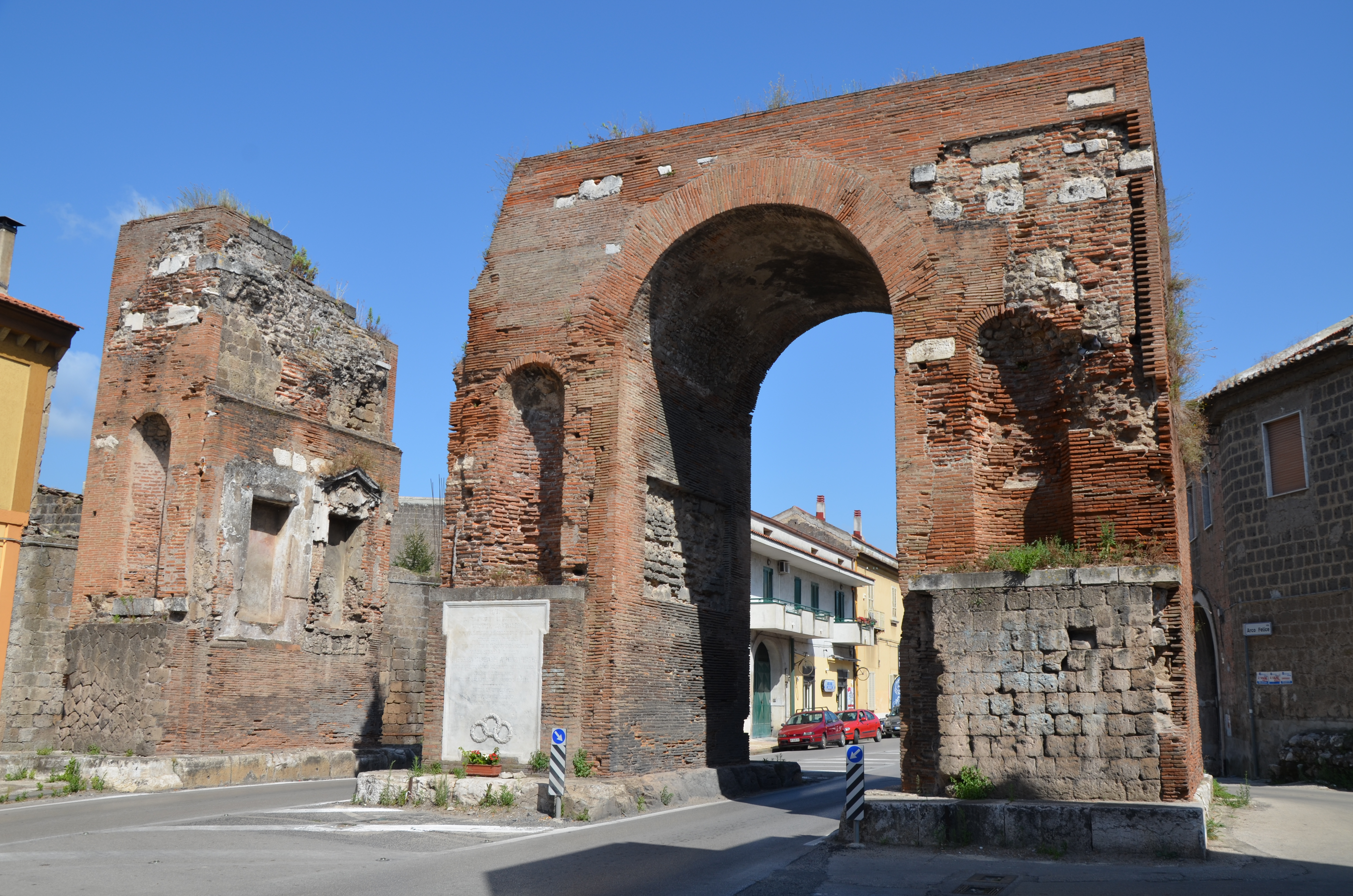
Arch of Hadrian

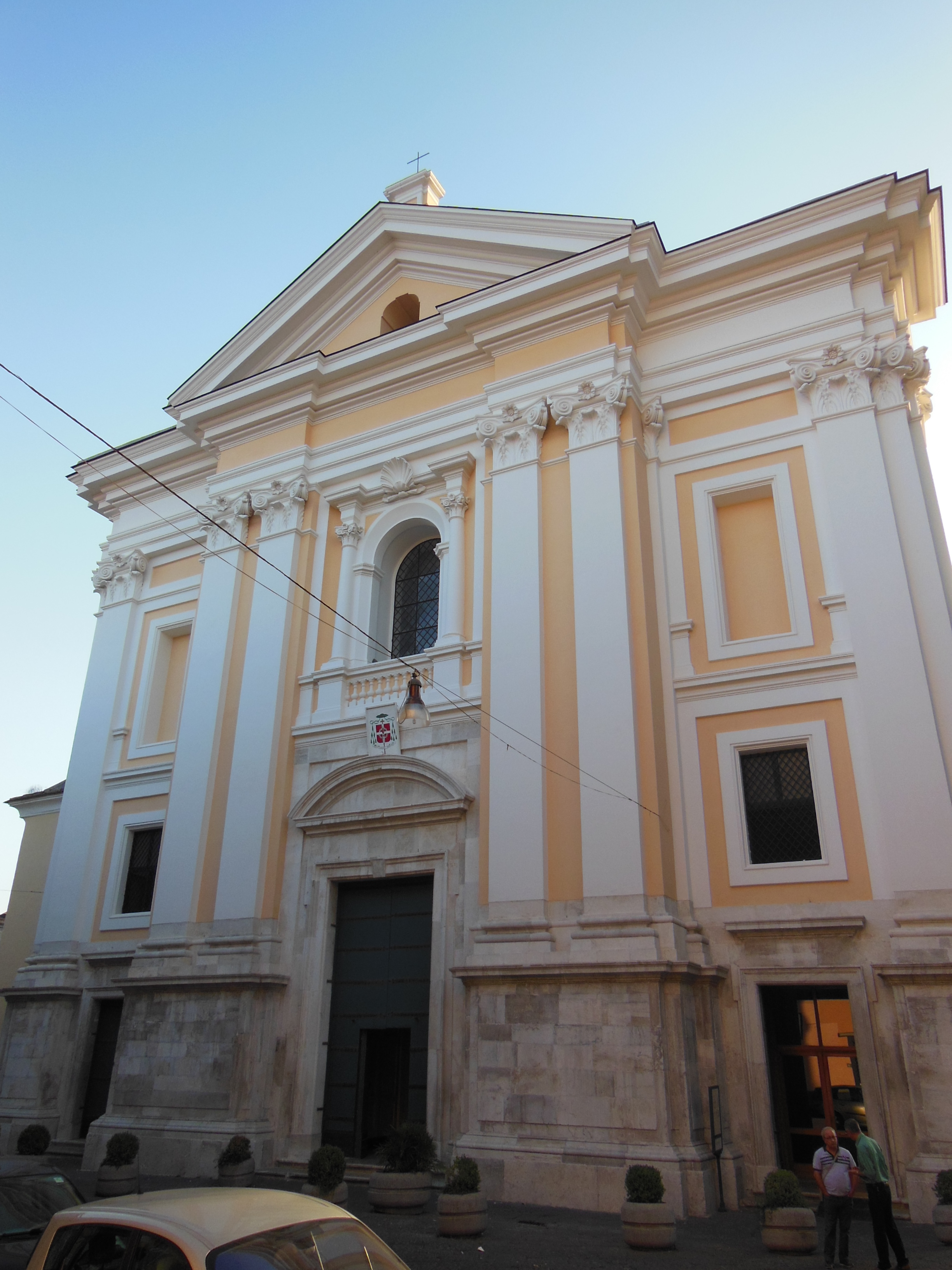
Aversa Cathedral

- Ailano
- Alife
- Alvignano
- Arienzo
- Aversa
- Baia e Latina
- Bellona
- Caianello
- Caiazzo
- Calvi Risorta
- Camigliano
- Cancello ed Arnone
- Capodrise
- Capriati a Volturno
- Capua
- Carinaro
- Carinola
- Casagiove
- Casal di Principe
- Casaluce
- Casapesenna
- Casapulla
- Caserta
- Castel Campagnano
- Castel di Sasso
- Castel Morrone
- Castel Volturno
- Castello del Matese
- Cellole
- Cervino
- Cesa
- Ciorlano
- Conca della Campania
- Curti
- Dragoni
- Falciano del Massico
- Fontegreca
- Formicola
- Francolise
- Frignano
- Gallo Matese
- Galluccio
- Giano Vetusto
- Gioia Sannitica
- Grazzanise
- Gricignano di Aversa
- Letino
- Liberi
- Lusciano
- Macerata Campania
- Maddaloni
- Marcianise
- Marzano Appio
- Mignano Monte Lungo
- Mondragone
- Orta di Atella
- Parete
- Pastorano
- Piana di Monte Verna
- Piedimonte Matese
- Pietramelara
- Pietravairano
- Pignataro Maggiore
- Pontelatone
- Portico di Caserta
- Prata Sannita
- Pratella
- Presenzano
- Raviscanina
- Recale
- Riardo
- Rocca d'Evandro
- Roccamonfina
- Roccaromana
- Rocchetta e Croce
- Ruviano
- San Cipriano d'Aversa
- San Felice a Cancello
- San Gregorio Matese
- San Marcellino
- San Marco Evangelista
- San Nicola la Strada
- San Pietro Infine
- San Potito Sannitico
- San Prisco
- San Tammaro
- Sant'Angelo d'Alife
- Sant'Arpino
- Santa Maria a Vico
- Santa Maria Capua Vetere
- Santa Maria la Fossa
- Sessa Aurunca
- Sparanise
- Succivo
- Teano
- Teverola
- Tora e Piccilli
- Trentola-Ducenta
- Vairano Patenora
- Valle Agricola
- Valle di Maddaloni
- Villa di Briano
- Villa Literno
- Vitulazio

== Demographics ==
As of 2026, the population is 909,493, of which 49.2% are male, and 50.8% are female. Minors make up 16.8% of the population, and seniors make up 20.2%.

Historical population

| Year | Pop. | ±% |
|---|---|---|
| 1861 | 352,860 | — |
| 1871 | 376,052 | +6.6% |
| 1881 | 389,396 | +3.5% |
| 1901 | 428,382 | +10.0% |
| 1911 | 434,514 | +1.4% |
| 1921 | 448,663 | +3.3% |
| 1931 | 481,964 | +7.4% |
| 1936 | 506,860 | +5.2% |

| Year | Pop. | ±% |
|---|---|---|
| 1951 | 601,372 | +18.6% |
| 1961 | 649,327 | +8.0% |
| 1971 | 677,959 | +4.4% |
| 1981 | 755,628 | +11.5% |
| 1991 | 815,815 | +8.0% |
| 2001 | 852,872 | +4.5% |
| 2011 | 904,921 | +6.1% |
| 2021 | 905,045 | +0.0% |

Source: ISTAT

=== Immigration ===
As of 2025, the foreign-born population is 66,395, making up 7.3% of the total population. The 5 largest foreign countries of origin are Ukraine (9,174), Romania (6,153), Albania (5,120), Switzerland (4,956) and Morocco (4,605).
