= Casapesenna =

- Comune
- Comune di Casapesenna
- Location within Italy Location within Campania
- Coordinates: 41°0′N 14°8′E
- Country: Italy
- Region: Campania
- Province: Caserta (CE)

Government
  - Mayor: Marcello De Rosa

Area
  - Total: 3.05 km^{2} (1.18 sq mi)
- Elevation: 25 m (82 ft)

Population (31 March 2017)
  - Total: 7,052
  - Density: 2,310/km^{2} (5,990/sq mi)
- Demonym: Casapesennesi
- Time zone: UTC+1 (CET)
  - Summer (DST): UTC+2 (CEST)
- Postal code: 81036
- Dialing code: 081
- Website: Official website

Casapesenna (Campanian: Casapesélle) is a comune (municipality) in the Province of Caserta in the Italian region Campania, located about 20 km (12 mi) northwest of Naples and about 20 km (12 mi) southwest of Caserta.
