= Villa Literno =

- Comune
- Comune di Villa Literno
- Location within Italy Location within Campania
- Coordinates: 41°1′N 14°4′E
- Country: Italy
- Region: Campania
- Province: Caserta (CE)

Government
  - Mayor: Valerio Di Fraia

Area
  - Total: 61.7 km^{2} (23.8 sq mi)
- Elevation: 10 m (33 ft)

Population (30 April 2023)
  - Total: 12,431
  - Density: 201/km^{2} (522/sq mi)
- Demonym: Liternesi
- Time zone: UTC+1 (CET)
  - Summer (DST): UTC+2 (CEST)
- Postal code: 81039
- Dialing code: 081
- Website: Official website

Villa Literno is a comune (municipality) in the Province of Caserta in the Italian region Campania, located about 25 kilometres (16 mi) northwest of Naples and about 25 kilometres (16 mi) west of Caserta.

Villa Literno borders the following municipalities: Cancello e Arnone, Casal di Principe, Castel Volturno, Giugliano in Campania, San Cipriano d'Aversa.

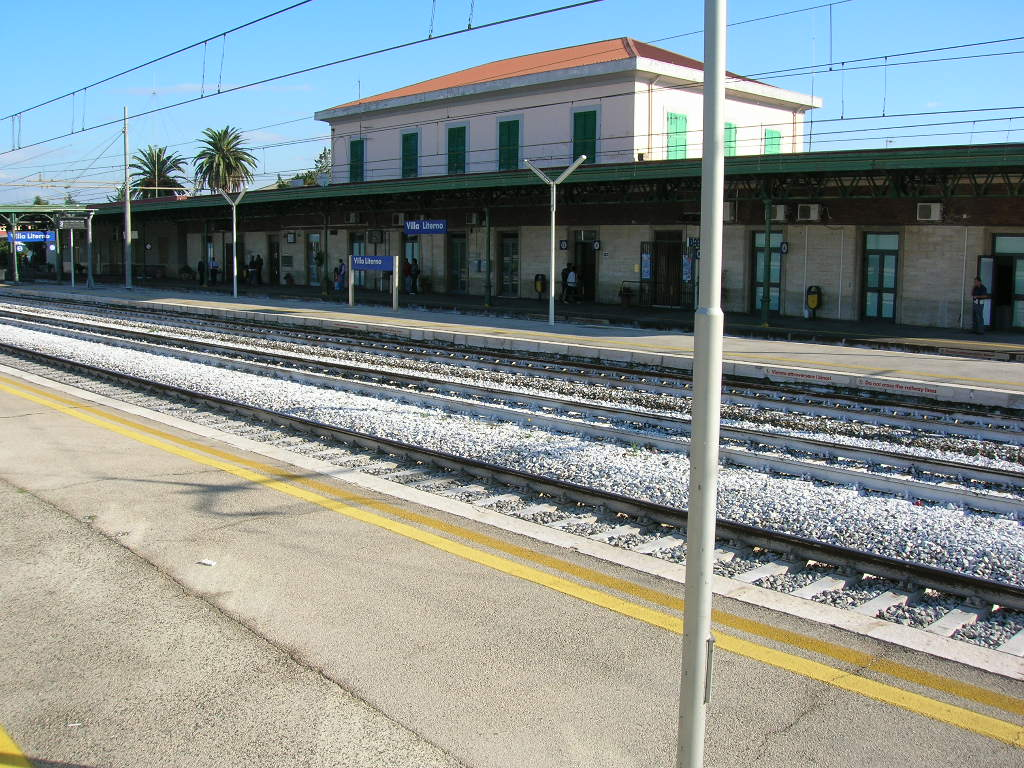
Villa Literno train station
