= Falciano del Massico =

- Comune
- Comune di Falciano del Massico
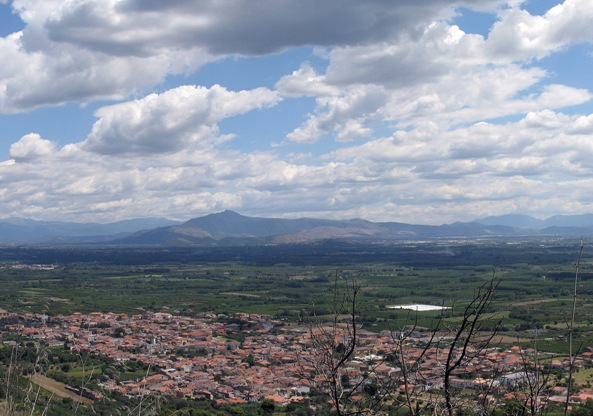

- Location within Italy Location within Campania
- Coordinates: 41°10′N 13°57′E
- Country: Italy
- Region: Campania
- Province: Caserta (CE)

Government
  - Mayor: Erasmo Fava

Area
  - Total: 42.72 km^{2} (16.49 sq mi)
- Elevation: 70 m (230 ft)

Population (31 July 2017)
  - Total: 3,618
  - Density: 84.69/km^{2} (219.3/sq mi)
- Demonym: Falcianesi
- Time zone: UTC+1 (CET)
  - Summer (DST): UTC+2 (CEST)
- Postal code: 81030
- Dialing code: 0823
- Patron saint: St. Roch, St. Martin and St. Peter the Apostle
- Saint day: 16 August, 11 November and 29 July
- Website: Official website

Falciano del Massico is a comune (municipality) in the Province of Caserta in the Italian region Campania. The village has a population of c. 3,600 and is located about 50 kilometres (31 mi; 27 nmi) northwest of Naples as well as about 35 kilometres (22 mi; 19 nmi) northwest of Caserta. The commune is home to a Regional Natural Preserve pivoting on the Lake Falciano, of volcanic origin.

== Politics ==
Since March 2012 it has been illegal to die in Falciano del Massico. The current mayor, Giulio Cesare Fava, issued a legal decree stating "It is forbidden, with immediate effect, to all citizens resident in the municipality of Falciano del Massico, and to whoever passes by its territory, to cross the border of earthly life and to enter the afterlife." This decree was issued because the commune's cemetery is currently full and the deceased must be buried in the nearby town of Mondragone. Mondragone is currently in a long-standing feud with Falciano del Massico, makes citizens pay significantly more for a cemetery plot there. The majority of residents in Falciano del Massico are retirees, and the mayor has requested that they "make every effort not to die until a new cemetery is built for the municipality." By the end of March 2012, two of the older residents had already "defied" the new law.
