= Mondragone =

Municipality in Campania, Italy

- Comune
- Città di Mondragone
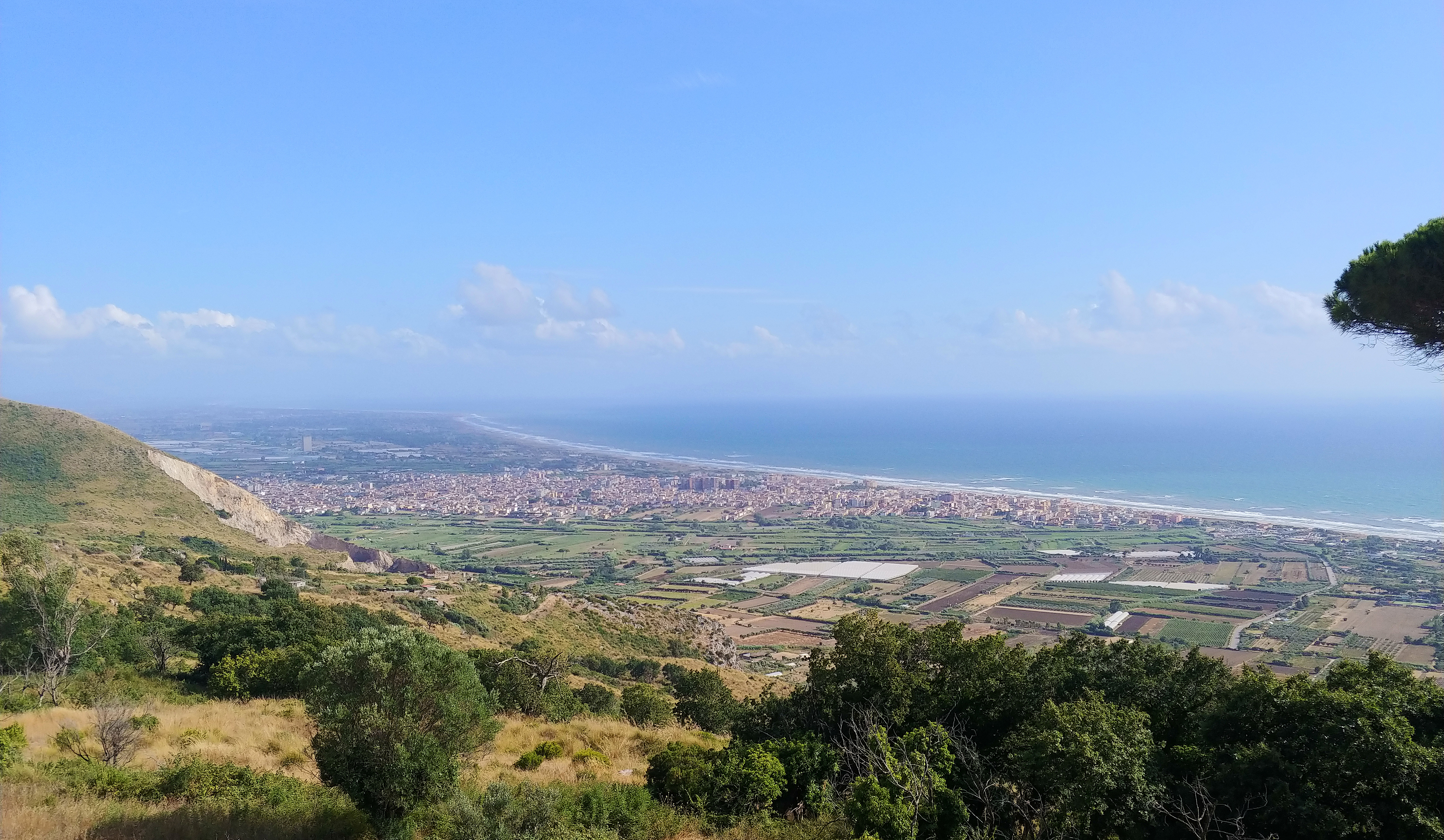

- Coat of arms

- Location within Italy Location within Campania
- Coordinates: 41°6′N 13°53′E
- Country: Italy
- Region: Campania
- Province: Caserta (CE)
- Frazioni: Levagnole, Pescopagano

Government
  - Mayor: Francesco Lavanga

Area
  - Total: 55.72 km^{2} (21.51 sq mi)
- Elevation: 10 m (33 ft)

Population (31 March 2017)
  - Total: 28,683
  - Density: 514.8/km^{2} (1,333/sq mi)
- Demonym: Mondragonesi
- Time zone: UTC+1 (CET)
  - Summer (DST): UTC+2 (CEST)
- Postal code: 81034
- Dialing code: 0823
- Patron saint: Madonna Incaldana
- Saint day: First Tuesday after Easter Monday
- Website: Official website

Mondragone (Campanian: Mundraóne) is a comune or municipality in the Province of Caserta in the Italian region of Campania. It is located about 45 kilometres (28 mi) northwest of Naples and about 40 kilometres (25 mi) west of Caserta. It faces mountains on one side and ocean on the other, with the former lending it a reputation for game birds such as quail.

== History ==
A Classical Attic votive relief was found at Mondragone. The identity of many of its figures is however disputed. In 1995, archaeologist Daniela Bonanome proposed that it also depicts deities associated with Asclepius and was originally dedicated in Classical Athens, then brought to the Sinuessa area during the Roman period. In 2007, a study by archaeologist Iphigeneia Leventi argued that it was made in an Attic workshop in the 4th century BC and dedicated in Campania by a follower of both the Eleusinian and Dionysiac-Orphic mysteries.

In the Middle Ages, it was occupied by the Normans who built (or re-built) a castle.

== Sites ==
Sights include:

- Ruins of Sinuessa Cellole & Sessa Aurunca
- Torre del Paladino, a 1st-century BC mausoleum
- Rocca or castle, built between the 8th and the 9th centuries and later modified by the Aragonese.
- Monastery of Sant'Anna al Monte
- Sanctuary of the Belvedere (c. 13th century)
- PAPA mountain
