= Grazzanise =

- Comune
- Comune di Grazzanise
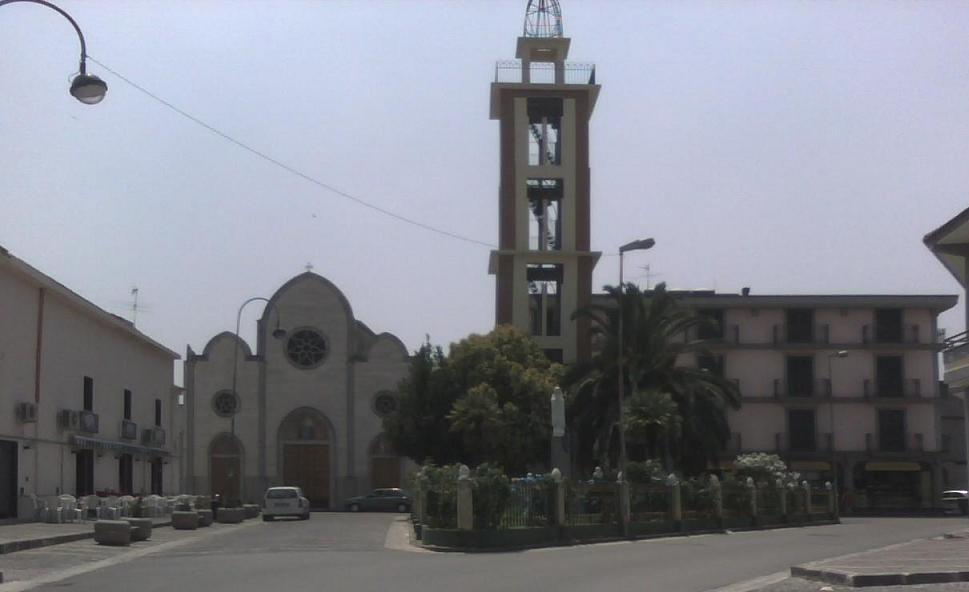

- Location within Italy Location within Campania
- Coordinates: 41°5′N 14°6′E
- Country: Italy
- Region: Campania
- Province: Caserta (CE)
- Frazioni: Brezza, Borgo Appio

Government
  - Mayor: Enrico Petrella

Area
  - Total: 47.0 km^{2} (18.1 sq mi)
- Elevation: 12 m (39 ft)

Population (31 December 2010)
  - Total: 6,812
  - Density: 145/km^{2} (375/sq mi)
- Demonym: Grazzanisani
- Time zone: UTC+1 (CET)
  - Summer (DST): UTC+2 (CEST)
- Postal code: 81046
- Dialing code: 0823
- Patron saint: St. John the Baptist
- Website: Official website

Grazzanise is a comune (municipality) in the Province of Caserta in the Italian region Campania, located about 30 kilometres (19 mi) northwest of Naples and about 20 kilometres (12 mi) west of Caserta.

== History ==
In ancient Roman times, it was an area covered by marshes caused by the nearby Volturno's floods. The town is mentioned for the first time in a bull by emperor Frederick II of 1234, as Graczanum. It was later populated by local vassals of the Angevine kings of Naples and their feudataries. In 1303 it is mentioned as Graczanisius.

During World War II, the area housed an airfield, which was repeatedly attacked by Allied bombers in August 1943 and from 4 to 6 September 1943. The German occupied it in 1943, after the Armistice between Italy and the Allies of 8 September 1943, expelling the Italian infantry division "Pasubio". Some 100 people died during another bombing, aiming at a bridge on the Volturno, performed by American B-26s in the night of 30 September 1943. The airport was captured by British troops in the following 10 October. Grazzanise Air Base, with limited civil use serving Caserta, is now used by the Italian Air Force 9° Stormo Caccia (9th Fighters Wing) and the 2nd NATO Signal Battalion.

In 1996–2000, the city's municipal council was disbanded by the Italian Ministry of Interior Affairs, due to camorra presence in the local political affairs.

== Climate ==
Climate data for Grazzanise (Grazzanise Air Base) (1991–2020)
Month	Jan	Feb	Mar	Apr	May	Jun	Jul	Aug	Sep	Oct	Nov	Dec	Year
Record high °C (°F)	20.0 (68.0)	21.0 (69.8)	26.6 (79.9)	30.4 (86.7)	35.8 (96.4)	36.6 (97.9)	39.8 (103.6)	39.6 (103.3)	36.6 (97.9)	31.2 (88.2)	28.0 (82.4)	24.0 (75.2)	39.8 (103.6)
Mean daily maximum °C (°F)	13.1 (55.6)	13.8 (56.8)	16.2 (61.2)	19.3 (66.7)	23.8 (74.8)	28.2 (82.8)	30.6 (87.1)	31.5 (88.7)	27.6 (81.7)	23.3 (73.9)	18.1 (64.6)	14.1 (57.4)	21.6 (70.9)
Daily mean °C (°F)	7.9 (46.2)	8.3 (46.9)	10.7 (51.3)	13.4 (56.1)	17.7 (63.9)	22.3 (72.1)	24.7 (76.5)	25.0 (77.0)	21.4 (70.5)	17.3 (63.1)	12.8 (55.0)	9.0 (48.2)	15.9 (60.6)
Mean daily minimum °C (°F)	3.4 (38.1)	3.2 (37.8)	5.4 (41.7)	7.6 (45.7)	11.4 (52.5)	16.1 (61.0)	18.5 (65.3)	18.9 (66.0)	15.9 (60.6)	12.2 (54.0)	8.3 (46.9)	4.6 (40.3)	10.4 (50.7)
Record low °C (°F)	−5.6 (21.9)	−10.0 (14.0)	−5.0 (23.0)	−4.2 (24.4)	0.0 (32.0)	0.0 (32.0)	10.0 (50.0)	12.8 (55.0)	6.8 (44.2)	1.0 (33.8)	−3.2 (26.2)	−6.0 (21.2)	−10.0 (14.0)
Average precipitation mm (inches)	89.2 (3.51)	71.4 (2.81)	82.5 (3.25)	66.9 (2.63)	52.4 (2.06)	26.2 (1.03)	17.1 (0.67)	24.9 (0.98)	77.5 (3.05)	97.6 (3.84)	151.7 (5.97)	98.4 (3.87)	855.8 (33.69)
Average precipitation days (≥ 1.0 mm)	8.7	8.3	7.5	7.5	5.6	3.1	1.9	2.3	6.0	7.9	11.3	9.6	79.7
Average relative humidity (%)	76.2	74.2	74.5	75.6	73.8	71.2	71.6	71.2	71.5	74.2	77.7	77.0	74.1
Average dew point °C (°F)	4.4 (39.9)	4.4 (39.9)	6.7 (44.1)	9.8 (49.6)	13.5 (56.3)	17.1 (62.8)	19.6 (67.3)	20.1 (68.2)	16.5 (61.7)	13.2 (55.8)	9.5 (49.1)	5.6 (42.1)	11.7 (53.1)
Mean monthly sunshine hours	148.2	164.9	195.6	211.8	260.1	289.2	325.5	312.8	238.2	200.3	143.7	139.2	2,629.4
Source: NOAA
