= Francolise =

- Comune
- Comune di Francolise
- Location within Italy Location within Campania
- Coordinates: 41°11′N 14°3′E
- Country: Italy
- Region: Campania
- Province: Caserta (CE)
- Frazioni: Ciamprisco, Montanaro, Sant'Andrea del Pizzone

Government
  - Mayor: Gaetano Tessitore

Area
  - Total: 40.7 km^{2} (15.7 sq mi)
- Elevation: 103 m (338 ft)

Population (31 March 2017)
  - Total: 4,886
  - Density: 120/km^{2} (311/sq mi)
- Demonym: Francolisani
- Time zone: UTC+1 (CET)
  - Summer (DST): UTC+2 (CEST)
- Postal code: 81040
- Dialing code: 0823
- Website: Official website

Francolise (locally La Torrë) is a comune (municipality) in the Province of Caserta in the Italian region Campania, located about 40 kilometres (25 mi) northwest of Naples and about 25 kilometres (16 mi) northwest of Caserta.
