= Marcianise =

- Comune
- Comune di Marcianise
- Coat of arms

- Location within Italy Location within Campania
- Coordinates: 41°2′N 14°18′E
- Country: Italy
- Region: Campania
- Province: Caserta (CE)
- Frazioni: Cantone, Macello, Puzzaniello, Pagani

Government
  - Mayor: Biagio Del Prete

Area
  - Total: 30 km^{2} (12 sq mi)
- Elevation: 33 m (108 ft)

Population (30 September 2017)
  - Total: 38,104
  - Density: 1,300/km^{2} (3,300/sq mi)
- Demonym: Marcianisani
- Time zone: UTC+1 (CET)
  - Summer (DST): UTC+2 (CEST)
- Postal code: 81025
- Dialing code: 0823
- Patron saint: St. Michael
- Saint day: May 8
- Website: Official website

Marcianise is a town and comune in the province of Caserta, Campania, southern Italy.

== History ==
In the area of the commune of Marcianise numerous tombs of Etruscan and Roman age have been excavated, although Oscan elements should have pre-existed. The origin of the today's city are uncertain. It was allegedly founded in the 6th century CE by bands of Ostrogoths after their defeat in the Gothic War.

In 861 it was probably destroyed by the Saracens along with Capua. After the creation of the Duchy of Capua, Marcianise followed the latter's history.

The area was repeatedly struck by cholera but, according to a legend, the city was miraculously spared by the July 1706 plague through the intercession of the Holy Crucifix. Later the marshy area was dried, and extensive cultivation of cannabis augmented the economy of the region.

== Main sights ==
- The Baroque church of the Annunziata. The interior has Neapolitan school frescoes.
- The Cathedral of St. Michael Archangel houses an allegedly miraculous crucifix which, according to the legend, saved the city from cholera in the 18th century.
- The Castle of Loriano (15th century) has maintained the towers, the walls and the interior church, while that in Ariola is now a private residence.

Near Marcianise, was the mediumwave transmitter for the Naples area, which worked on 657 kHz. It was used as an antenna, 205 metres (673 ft) tall, a guyed mast, radiator insulated, against the ground, the tallest radio tower on the Italian mainland. This antenna and transmitter were removed in 2012.

== Dialect ==
The dialect of Marcianise, although similar to Neapolitan, shows a long series of peculiar influences ranging from French and English to more ancient Greek and Oscan. Examples of local exclusive words include ching for "tile" (Italian: tegola) and cstunia for "turtle" (Italian: tartaruga).

== Economy ==
Marcianise is home to several craftsmanship firms working gold and coral, as well as numerous chemical, manufacture and chemical industries. Together with the territories of Maddaloni, Acerra, Caivano and Teverola, the commune forms the second most industrialized area of Italy. Dairy and wine production is also flourishing.

== Transportation ==
Marcianise has a station on the Caserta-Aversa-Naples railroad.

During World War II there was an airfield nearby used by the Royal Air Force and U.S. Air Force:

- No. 13 Squadron RAF
- No. 18 Squadron RAF
- No. 55 Squadron RAF
- No. 92 Squadron RAF
- No. 114 Squadron RAF
- No. 145 Squadron RAF
- No. 417 Squadron RAF
- No. 600 Squadron RAF
- No. 601 Squadron RAF

- Air Headquarters Italy Communication Squadron RAF
- 86th Bombardment Group
- 97th Bombardment Group
- 99th Bombardment Group
