= San Nicola la Strada =

- Comune
- Comune di San Nicola la Strada
- Location within Italy Location within Campania
- Coordinates: 41°3′N 14°20′E
- Country: Italy
- Region: Campania
- Province: Caserta (CE)

Government
  - Mayor: Vito Marotta

Area
  - Total: 4.7 km^{2} (1.8 sq mi)
- Elevation: 58 m (190 ft)

Population (Dec. 2010)
  - Total: 21,746
  - Density: 4,600/km^{2} (12,000/sq mi)
- Demonym: Sannicolesi
- Time zone: UTC+1 (CET)
  - Summer (DST): UTC+2 (CEST)
- Postal code: 81020
- Dialing code: 0823
- Patron saint: St. Nicholas
- Website: Official website

San Nicola la Strada is a comune (municipality) in the Province of Caserta in the Italian region Campania, located about 25 kilometres (16 mi) northeast of Naples and about 2 kilometres (1 mi) south of Caserta.
