= Portico di Caserta =

- Comune
- Comune di Portico di Caserta
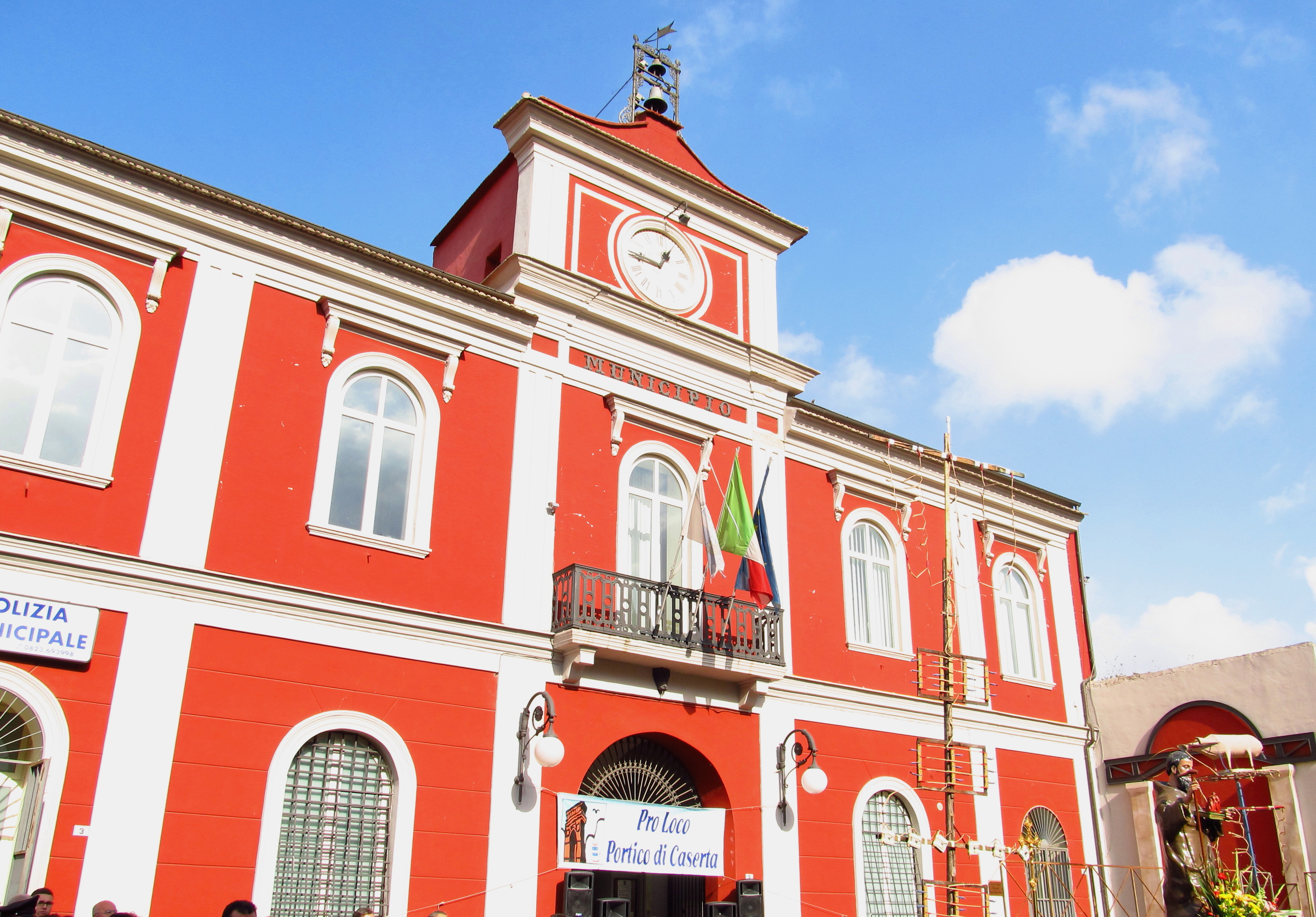
- Town hall

- Coat of arms

- Location within Italy Location within Campania
- Coordinates: 41°3′N 14°17′E
- Country: Italy
- Region: Campania
- Province: Caserta (CE)
- Frazioni: Musicile

Government
  - Mayor: Giuseppe Oliviero

Area
  - Total: 1.91 km^{2} (0.74 sq mi)
- Elevation: 33 m (108 ft)

Population (31 December 2015)
  - Total: 7,802
  - Density: 4,080/km^{2} (10,600/sq mi)
- Demonym: Portichesi
- Time zone: UTC+1 (CET)
  - Summer (DST): UTC+2 (CEST)
- Postal code: 81050
- Dialing code: 0823
- Patron saint: St. Peter
- Website: Official website

Portico di Caserta is a comune (municipality) in the Province of Caserta in the Italian region Campania, located about 25 kilometres (16 mi) north of Naples and about 5 kilometres (3 mi) southwest of Caserta.
