= Recale =

- Comune
- Comune di Recale
- Location within Italy Location within Campania
- Coordinates: 41°3′N 14°18′E
- Country: Italy
- Region: Campania
- Province: Caserta (CE)

Government
  - Mayor: Patrizia Vestini

Area
  - Total: 3.2 km^{2} (1.2 sq mi)
- Elevation: 43 m (141 ft)

Population (31 March 2016)
  - Total: 7,789
  - Density: 2,400/km^{2} (6,300/sq mi)
- Demonym: Recalesi
- Time zone: UTC+1 (CET)
  - Summer (DST): UTC+2 (CEST)
- Postal code: 81020
- Dialing code: 0823
- Patron saint: St. Anthimus of Rome
- Saint day: May 11
- Website: Official website

Recale is a comune (municipality) in the Province of Caserta in the Italian region Campania, located about 25 kilometres (16 mi) north of Naples and about 3 kilometres (2 mi) southwest of Caserta.

== Twin towns ==
- Bovino, Italy, since 2010
