= Maddaloni =

- Comune
- Comune di Maddaloni
- Location within Italy Location within Campania
- Coordinates: 41°02′N 14°23′E
- Country: Italy
- Region: Campania
- Province: Caserta (CE)

Government
  - Mayor: Andrea de Filippo

Area
  - Total: 36 km^{2} (14 sq mi)
- Elevation: 73 m (240 ft)

Population (May 2, 2012)
  - Total: 39 248
  - Density: 1.1/km^{2} (2.8/sq mi)
- Demonym: Maddalonesi
- Time zone: UTC+1 (CET)
  - Summer (DST): UTC+2 (CEST)
- Postal code: 81024
- Dialing code: 0823
- Patron saint: St. Michael
- Website: Official website

Maddaloni (Campanian: Madalùnë) is a town and comune of Campania, Italy, in the province of Caserta, about 5 kilometres (3 mi) southeast of Caserta, with stations on the railways from Caserta to Benevento and from Caserta to Naples.

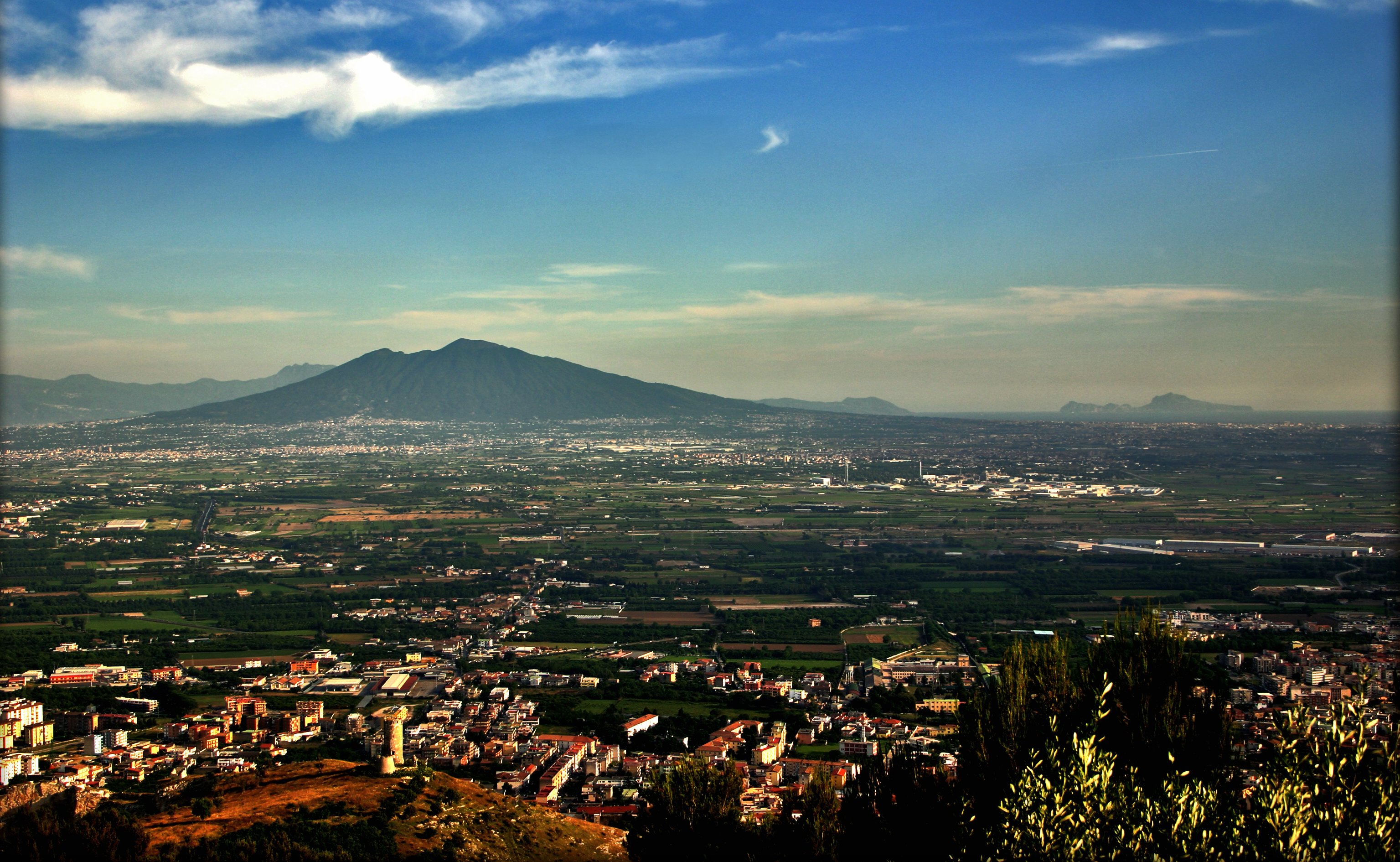
Maddaloni in the foreground, Mount Vesuvius and Capri in the background.

== Main sights ==
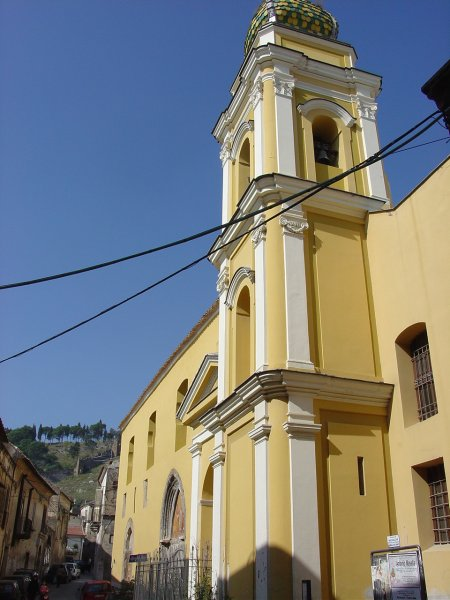
The Church of Saint Margherita

The city is at the base of one of the Tifata hills, the towers of its medieval castle and the Church of San Michele crowning the heights above. The fine old palace of the Caraffa family (once dukes of Maddaloni), the old college now named after Giordano Bruno, and the institute for the sons of soldiers are the main points of interest.

The Gothic church of Santa Margherita has a series of 15th-century frescoes. The church of the Annunziata has a series of early 17th century paintings that decorate the rich wooden ceiling by the Florentine painter Giovanni Balducci. The Church of Corpus Domini has many interesting paintings and a beautiful altar by Vanvitelli.

The town has two museums, the Museo Civico and the Museo Archeologico, which contains pre-Roman tombs and objects from the ancient city of Calatia.

There are many important schools in Maddaloni. The "Convitto Nazionale Giordano Bruno" is the oldest public secondary school in the province of Caserta. It was founded in 1807 in the former Franciscan convent. The great hall has a ceiling, which is decorated with the largest canvas painting in the world spanning 720 square metres (7,800 ft^{2}).

The "Villaggio dei Ragazzi" was originally a school for orphans founded in 1947 by local priest Don Salvatore D'Angelo. The private school has become an important centre of learning in the province and has been run by the religious order The Legion of Christ since its founder died in 2000.

Giulietta Sacco was born here in 1944 and continued to live here, is a prominent interpreter of Neapolitan songs in the late 1960s and 1970s.

About 4 kilometres (2 mi) east of Valle di Maddaloni is the Ponte della Valle, an aqueduct built on the orders of Charles of Bourbon king of Naples and his son. It was built to convey the water of the Taburno to Caserta across the valley between Monte Longano and Monte Gargano. In that area, the aqueduct goes past a threefold series of arches rising to a height of nearly 100 metres (330 ft) and measuring 529 metres (1,736 ft) long. The work was designed by Luigi Vanvitelli, and constructed between 1753 and 1759.
