= Teia gens =

Ancient Roman family

The gens Teia was an obscure plebeian family at ancient Rome. No members of this gens appear in history, but a number are known from inscriptions.

== Praenomina ==
The Teii used a variety of common praenomina, including Gaius, Lucius, Publius, Quintus, and Sextus. There are also two examples of the old praenomen Spurius, which had become scarce by imperial times, and one of the feminine praenomen Maxima.

== Members ==
This list includes abbreviated praenomina. For an explanation of this practice, see filiation.

- Teia L. f. Galla, buried in a first-century tomb at Venafrum in Sabinum, aged twenty-five, along with her husband, Titus Titucius Florianus.
- Teia Ɔ l. Attice, a freedwoman named in a sepulchral inscription from Allifae in Samnium, dating from the middle part of the first century.
- Sextus Teius Januarius, buried in a first- or second-century tomb at Aquileia in Venetia and Histria, built by his wife, the freedwoman Titania Charis.
- Lucius Teius L. (f.?), buried in a second-century tomb at Luceria in Apulia, along with Teia Sperata, Lucius Sertius, and Arventia.
- Teia L. (f.?) Sperata, buried in a second-century tomb at Luceria, along with Lucius Teius, Lucius Sertius, and Arventia.
- Publius Teius Asclepius, together with his wife, Teia Zoe, built a second- or third-century family sepulchre at Rome for their son, Publius Teius Rufus, the Vestal Teia Rufina, and Teia Asclepiodote.
- Teia Zoe, the wife of Publius Teius Asclepius, with whom she built a second- or third-century family sepulchre at Rome for their son, Publius Teius Rufus, the Vestal Teia Rufina, and Teia Asclepiodote.
- Publius Teius P. f. Rufus, the son of Publius Teius Asclepius and Teia Zoe, who built a second- or third-century family sepulchre at Rome for him, the Vestal Teia Rufina, and Teia Asclepiodote.
- Teia Rufina, one of the Vestals, buried in a second- or third-century family sepulchre at Rome, built by Publius Teius Asclepius and his wife, Teia Zoe.
- Teia Asclepiodote, buried in a second- or third-century family sepulchre at Rome, built by Publius Teius Asclepius and his wife, Teia Zoe, for their son, Publius Teius Rufus, the Vestal Teia Rufina, and Teia Asclepiodote.
- Teia Threpte, buried along with the Vestal Cunaria Rufina, in a second- or third-century tomb at Rome, built by her brother, Glyptus.
- Teius Olympus, dedicated a tomb at Rome, dating between the middle of the second century and the end of the third, for his wife, Fabia Fybe. (Note: Presumably Phoebe.)
- Teius Ursio, dedicated a tomb at Delminium in Dalmatia, dating between the middle of the second century and the end of the third, for his wife, Lavo, aged thirty.
- Sp. Teius Ligdamus, dedicated a tomb at Atina in Campania, dating between the late second century and the end of the third, for his son, Spurius Teius Arelonius.
- Sp. Teius Sp. f. Arelonius, buried at Pertosa, aged twenty-four, in a tomb built by his father, Spurius Teius Ligdamus, dating between the late second century and the end of the third.

=== Undated Teii ===
- Teia, buried at Ossonoba in Lusitania.
- Teius, buried at Marcomades Selorum in Africa Proconsularis, aged seventy.
- Maxsuma Teia, daughter of Arconus, was a native of Turgalium. She was buried at Norba in Lusitania, aged twenty.
- Teia Q. f. Galla, buried at Pisaurum in Umbria, along with Lucius Staius Nema.
- Quintus Teius C. f. Paternus, a youth buried at Norba, aged fifteen.
- Gaius Teius Proclus, buried at Norba, aged seventy-five.

== See also ==
- List of Roman gentes

== Bibliography ==
- Theodor Mommsen et alii, Corpus Inscriptionum Latinarum (The Body of Latin Inscriptions, abbreviated CIL), Berlin-Brandenburgische Akademie der Wissenschaften (1853–present).
- Paul von Rohden, Elimar Klebs, & Hermann Dessau, Prosopographia Imperii Romani (The Prosopography of the Roman Empire, abbreviated PIR), Berlin (1898).
- Africa Italiana: Rivista di Storia e d'Arte a Cura del Ministero delle Colonie (Italian Africa: History and Art Magazine of the Colonial Ministry), Istituto Italiano d'Arti Grafiche, Bergamo (1927–1941).
- Inscriptiones Italiae (Inscriptions from Italy), Rome (1931-present).
- Giovanni Battista Brusin, Inscriptiones Aquileiae (Inscriptions of Aquileia), Udine (1991–1993).
- Julio Esteban Ortega, Corpus de Inscripciones Latinas de Cáceres (The Body of Latin Inscriptions from Caceres), Universidad de Extremadura (2007–2013).
- Manfred Clauss, Anne Kolb, & Wolfgang A. Slaby, Epigraphik Datenbank Clauss/Slaby (abbreviated EDCS).
