= Prata Sannita =

- Comune
- Comune di Prata Sannita
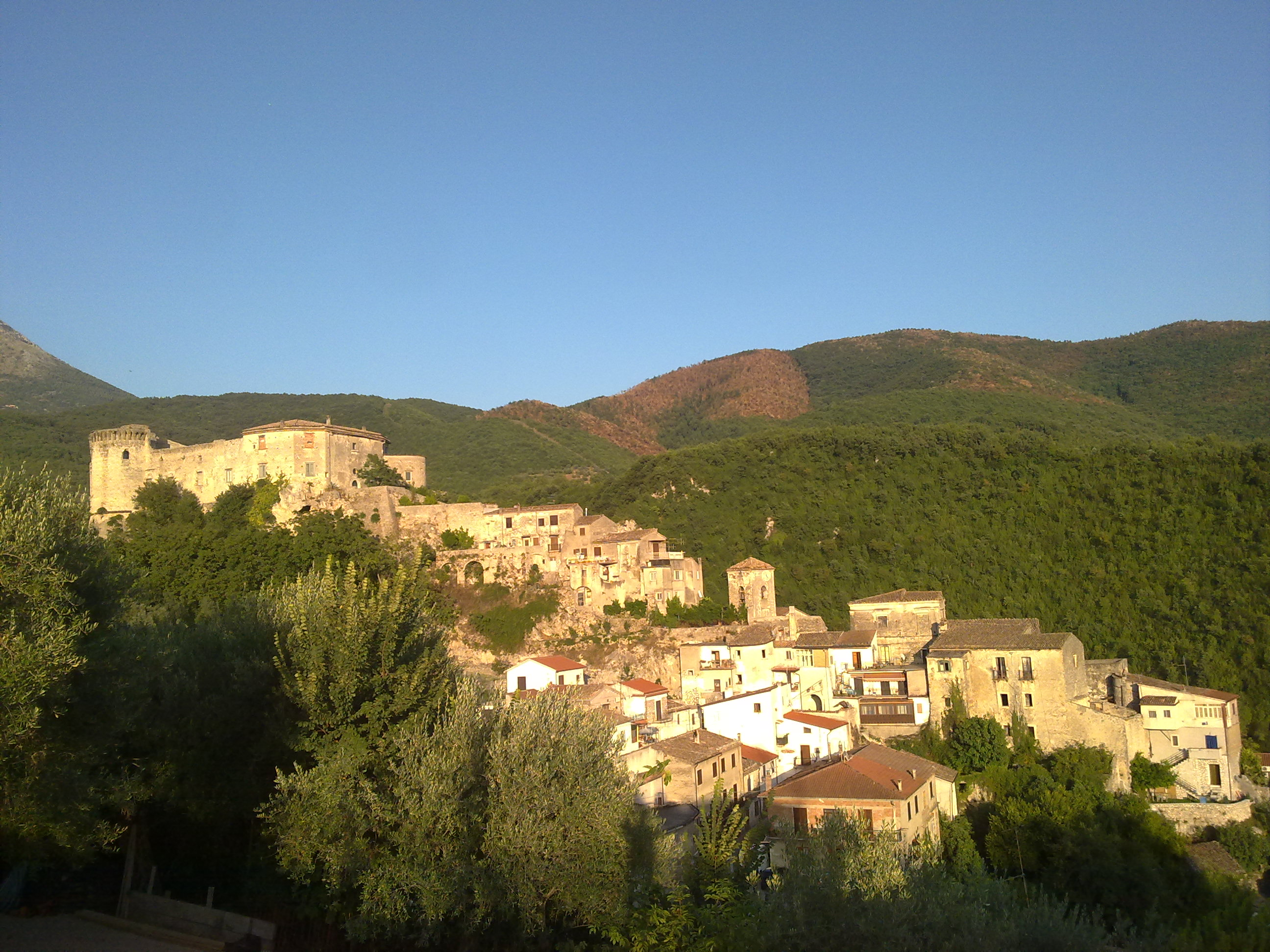

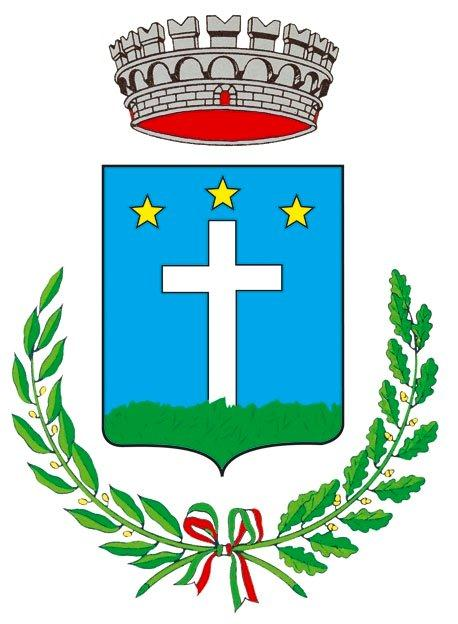
- Coat of arms

- Location within Italy Location within Campania
- Coordinates: 41°26′N 14°12′E
- Country: Italy
- Region: Campania
- Province: Caserta (CE)

Government
  - Mayor: Domenico Scuncio

Area
  - Total: 21.1 km^{2} (8.1 sq mi)
- Elevation: 360 m (1,180 ft)

Population (31 January 2017)
  - Total: 1,478
  - Density: 70.0/km^{2} (181/sq mi)
- Demonym: Pratesi
- Time zone: UTC+1 (CET)
  - Summer (DST): UTC+2 (CEST)
- Postal code: 81010
- Dialing code: 0823
- Patron saint: St. Pancratius
- Website: Official website

Prata Sannita is a comune (municipality) in the Province of Caserta in the Italian region Campania, located about 70 kilometres (43 mi) north of Naples and about 40 kilometres (25 mi) northwest of Caserta.

Prata Sannita borders the following municipalities: Ailano, Ciorlano, Fontegreca, Gallo Matese, Letino, Pratella, Raviscanina, and Valle Agricola.
