= Richard of Rupecanina =

12th century Count of Rupecanina

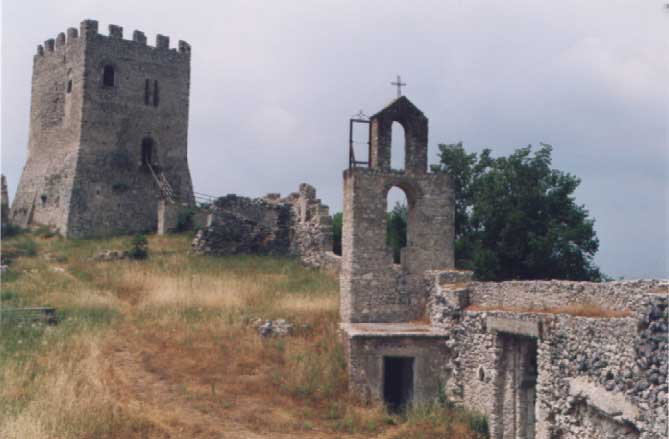
The centrepiece of Richard's lands was the "castle of Sant'Angelo, called Dog-cliff" (oppidum Sancti Angeli cognomento Rabicanum)

Richard (flourished 1131–1148) was the Italo-Norman count of Rupecanina (today Raviscanina).

Richard was a son of Count Robert of Alife and Gaitelgrima, younger brother of Count Rainulf II of Alife and brother-in-law of Duke William II of Apulia. He was also a distant cousin of Prince Robert II of Capua, as both belonged to the extended Drengot family. He had two sons: Andrew, who succeeded him at Rupecanina, and Roger, who later succeeded to the county of Alife.

During Richard's time, feudal concepts like those of fiefs and aids were just being introduced into Capua. In 1131, Richard claimed to possess the town of Avellino and castle of Mercogliano as allods and to owe no feudal duties for them. According to Alexander of Telese in his Deeds Done by King Roger of Sicily (I.xiii), when Roger heard this he sent an envoy to demand Richard's submission. Richard had the man blinded and his nose cut off. Roger took Avellino by force. In April 1134, he was a witness when his brother Rainulf swore an oath before Bishop Stantio of Caiazzo, promising to cede to the diocese a large number of estates.

Richard and his brother supported Prince Robert II of Capua in his war with King Roger II of Sicily. When Roger attacked Aversa in 1135, Rainulf fled to the protection of Duke Sergius VII of Naples, leaving Richard to defend their lands from his stronghold of Rupecanina. According to Alexander of Telese (III.xi and xiv), Richard fled at Roger's approach, but was unable to join his brother at Naples. He left behind one of his sons as the king's hostage. Deprived of their fiefs, Richard, Rainulf and Robert went in exile to the court of Emperor Lothair II in Germany by early 1136, where they clamoured for the emperor to lead an expedition against Roger. When the imperial army finally moved south in 1137, the three were able briefly to regain their fiefs. In August 1137, Pope Innocent II and Emperor Lothair jointly invested Rainulf with the Duchy of Apulia. Lothair loaned him an army of 800 German knights, which he promptly placed under the command of Richard and their younger brother Alexander. Richard quickly secured all of Apulia. This recovery was brief. After Lothair left, Richard fled with Robert to the court of the pope. After the death of Rainulf, Innocent gathered a large army and personally led it into Roger's domains. On 22 July 1139, at the battle of Galluccio, the papal army was defeated and the pope and his treasure captured. Richard and Robert managed to escape the rout. Both went into exile in Germany, where Richard was still living as late as 1148.

== Sources ==
- Chalandon, Ferdinand (1907). Histoire de la domination normande en Italie et en Sicile. 2 vols. Paris: A. Picard et fils.
- Curtis, Edmund (1912). Roger of Sicily and the Normans in Lower Italy, 1016–1154. New York: G. P. Putnam's Sons.
- Gambella, Angelo (2007). Medioevo Alifano: Potere e Popolo nello Stato Normanno di Alife. Studi Storici sul Medioevo Italiano. Rome: Drengo.
- Loud, G. A. (1981). "A Calendar of the Diplomas of the Norman Princes of Capua". Papers of the British School at Rome. 49: 99–143. doi:10.1017/S0068246200008503.
- Loud, G. A., ed. (2010). "The Deeds Done by King Roger of Sicily by Alexander of Telese" (PDF). Medieval Sicily. Archived from the original on December 5, 2013.
- Loud, G. A. (2013). "Norman Traditions in Southern Italy". In Burkhardt, Stefan; Foerster, Thomas (eds.). Norman Tradition and Transcultural Heritage: Exchange of Cultures in the 'Norman' Peripheries of Medieval Europe. Ashgate. pp. 35–56.
- Loud, G. A.; Wiedemann, Thomas E. J., eds. (1998). The History of the Tyrants of Sicily by 'Hugo Falcandus', 1154–69. Manchester: Manchester University Press.
- Mancini, Nicola (1982). Riccardo ed Andrea di Ravecanina. Brescia.
- Takayama, Hiroshi (1993). The Administration of the Norman Kingdom of Sicily. Leiden: E. J. Brill.
