= Pratella =

- Comune
- Comune di Pratella
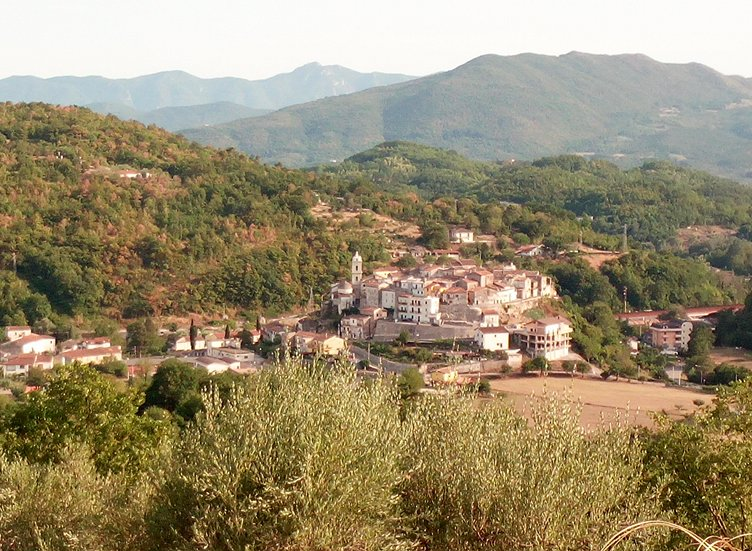

- Location within Italy Location within Campania
- Coordinates: 41°24′N 14°11′E
- Country: Italy
- Region: Campania
- Province: Caserta (CE)
- Frazioni: Mastrati, Roccavecchia

Government
  - Mayor: Romualdo Cacciola

Area
  - Total: 33.74 km^{2} (13.03 sq mi)
- Elevation: 152 m (499 ft)

Population (31 December 2010)
  - Total: 1,635
  - Density: 48.46/km^{2} (125.5/sq mi)
- Demonym: Pratellesi
- Time zone: UTC+1 (CET)
  - Summer (DST): UTC+2 (CEST)
- Postal code: 81010
- Dialing code: 0823
- Website: Official website

Pratella is a comune (municipality) in the Province of Caserta in the Italian region Campania, located about 60 kilometres (37 mi) north of Naples and about 40 kilometres (25 mi) northwest of Caserta.

Pratella borders the following municipalities: Ailano, Ciorlano, Prata Sannita, Presenzano, Sesto Campano, Vairano Patenora.
