= Allifae =

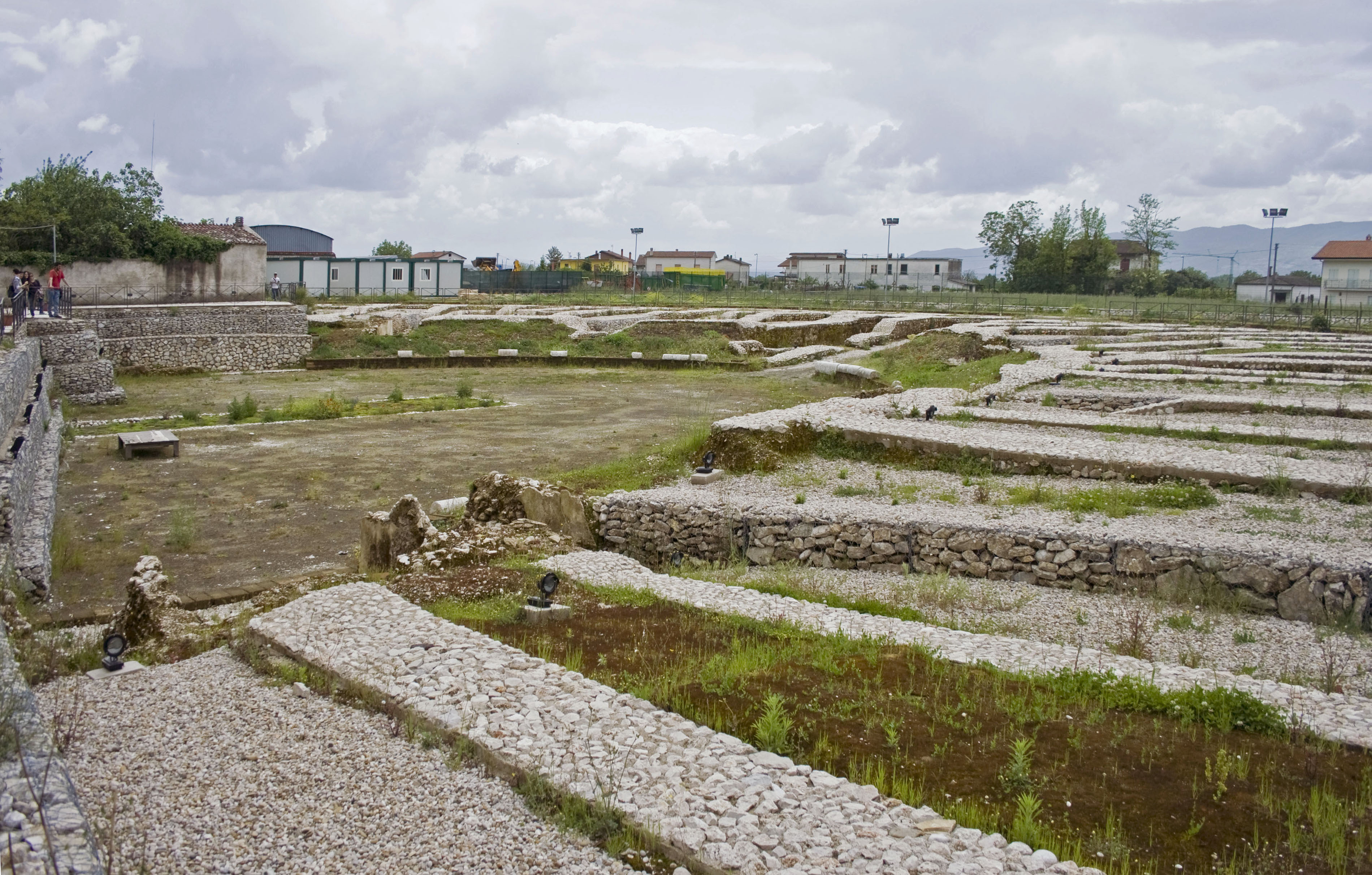
- Amphitheatres of Alife
- Interactive map of Allifae
- 41.325511°N 14.334859°E
- Type: Settlement
- Location: Alife, Province of Caserta, Italy
- Region: Campania

Site notes
- Management: Soprintendenza per i beni archeologici di Salerno, Avellino e Caserta
- Public access: Yes
- Website: Sito Archeologico di Allifae (in Italian)

Allifae was an ancient town of Italy, a center of Oscan or Samnite origin, situated in the valley of the Vulturnus, at the foot of the lofty mountain group now called the Monte Matese, about 40 km northwest of Telesia, and 27 km east-northwest of Teano.

It was close to the frontiers of Campania, and is enumerated among the Campanian cities by Pliny, and by Silius Italicus but Strabo expressly calls it a Samnite city That it was so at an earlier period is certain, as we find it repeatedly mentioned in the wars of the Romans with that people. Allifae was conquered multiple times by the Romans, initially in 326 BC during the Second Samnite Wars; Livy wrote:

"Three towns fell into their hands, Allifæ, Callifæ, and Ruffrium; and the adjoining country to a great extent was, on the first arrival of the consuls, laid entirely waste" (Livy, VIII. 25) .

However, the Romans lost control soon after in 310 BC:

"During these transactions in Etruria the other Consul CM. Rutilus took Allife by storm from the Samnites, and many of their forts and smaller towns were either destroyed or surrendered uninjured" (Livy, IX. 38).

The battles culminated three years later in 307 BC:

"The proconsul Quintus Fabius fought near the city Allifae a pitched battle with the army of the Samnites. The victory was complete, the enemy were driven from the field and pursued to their camp; and they could not have held the camp had there not been very little daylight left... guards were posted in the night to prevent anyone's escaping. The next day, before it was well light, they began to surrender. The Samnites among them bargained to be dismissed in their tunics; all these were sent under the yoke.The allies of the Samnites... sold into slavery, to the number of seven thousand. Those who gave themselves out for Hernic citizens were detained apart in custody, and Fabius sent them all to the senate in Rome. There an enquiry was held as to whether they had been conscripted or had fought voluntarily for the Samnites against the Romans; after which they were parceled out amongst the Latins to be guarded." (Livy, IX. 42)

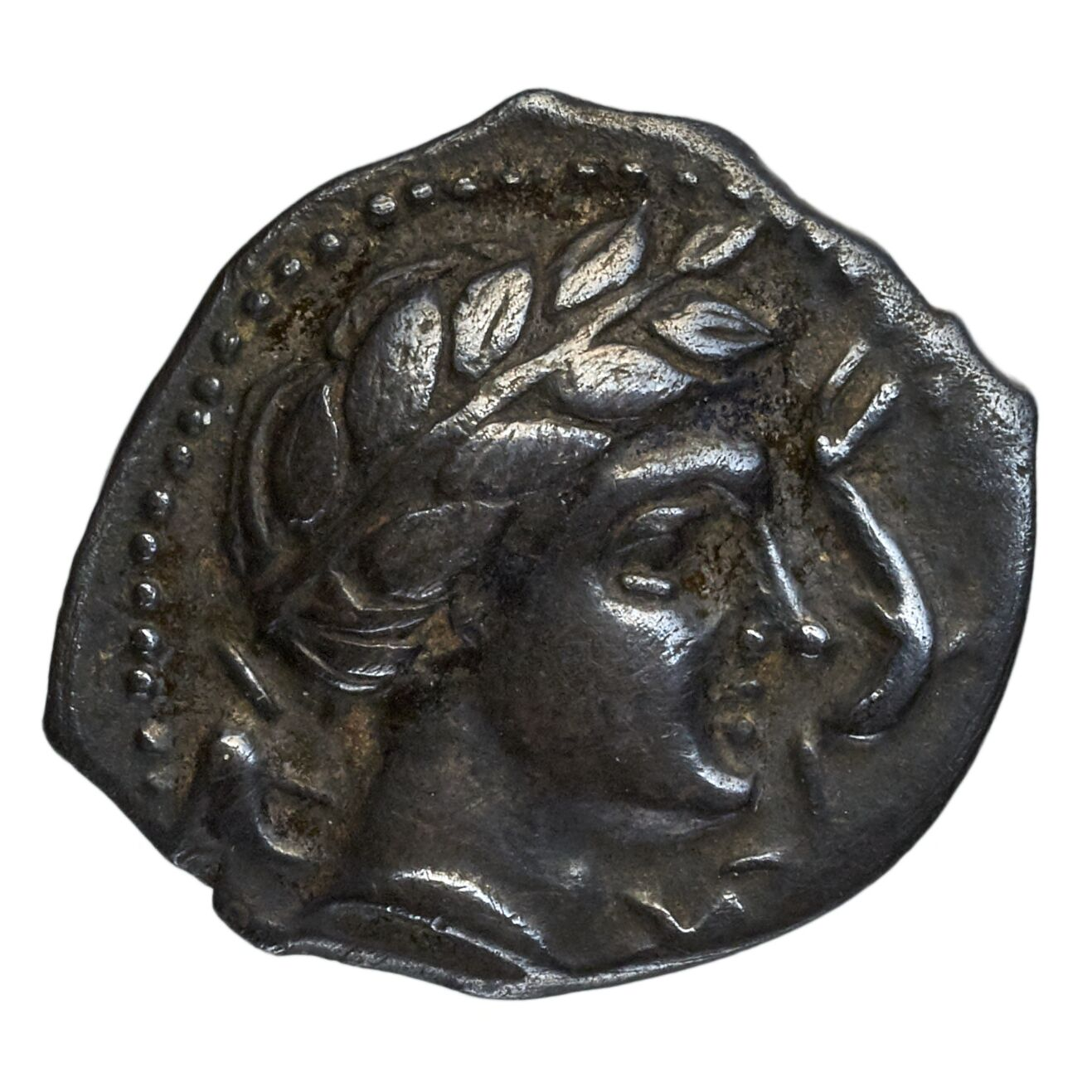
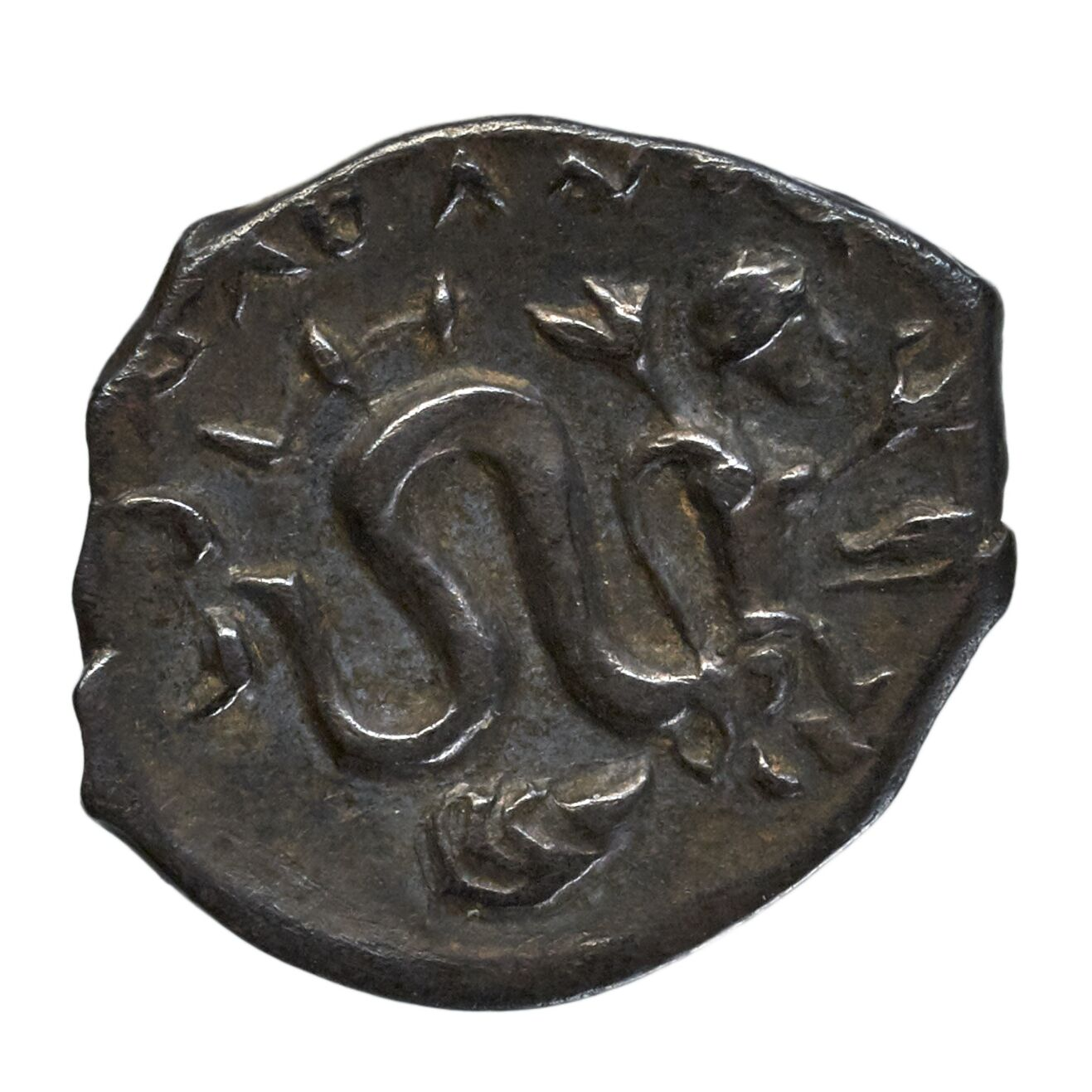
Silver obol of Allifae: on the obverse, a laureate head of Apollo surrounded by three dolphins, with Scylla on the reverse. Allifae produced its own coinage from about 325 to 275 BCE.

During the Second Punic War its territory was alternately traversed or occupied by the Romans and by Hannibal, but no mention is made of the town itself. Strabo speaks of it as one of the few cities of the Samnites which had survived the calamities of the Social War: and we learn from Cicero that it possessed an extensive and fertile territory in the valley of the Vulturnus, which appears to have adjoined that of Venafrum According to the Liber Coloniarum (p. 231), a colony was established there by the triumvirs, and its colonial rank, though not mentioned by Pliny, is confirmed by the evidence of inscriptions. These also attest that it continued to be a place of importance under the Roman Empire: and was adorned with many new public buildings under the reign of Hadrian.

It is placed by the Itineraries on the direct road from Rome to Beneventum by the Via Latina, at the distance of 17 miles from Teanum, and 43 from Beneventum; but the latter number is certainly too large.

The site of the Samnite city, which in the 4th century BC had a coinage of its own, is not known; the Roman town lay in what are now the comuni of Alife and Sant'Angelo d'Alife, and its walls (4th century) enclose the preserved remains of large baths (Thermae Herculis) and a theatre.
