= Andrew of Rupecanina =

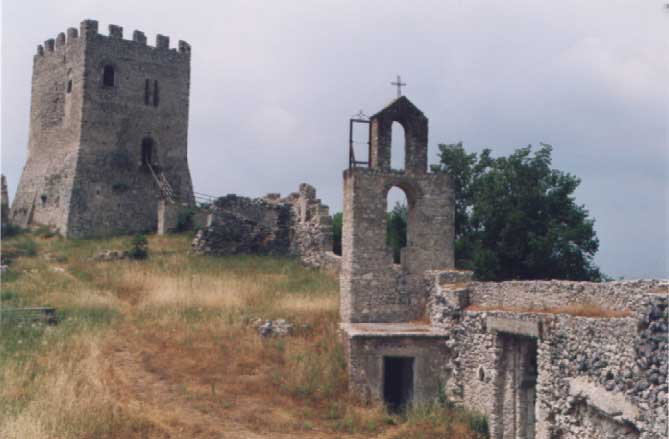
The ruins of the castle at Raviscanina.

Andrew (Italian: Andrea di Raviscanina), count of Rupecanina, was a Norman nobleman of the Mezzogiorno. He was a longtime adversary of the royal power.

On 22 July 1138, Pope Innocent II and his supporters, Robert II of Capua and Richard of Rupecanina, were ambushed at Galluccio. Innocent was captured, but Robert and Richard escaped to Germany, where they were received by King Conrad III. Frederick Barbarossa succeeded Conrad in 1152 and, at the Diet of Würzburg, with the Normans present, decided to fulfill the dreams of the Emperor Lothair II and bring all Italy to heel. By the time he was ready to cross the Alps, Richard had died and was succeeded, formally, by his son Andrew, raised since childhood in Germany, at the imperial court.

After Barbarossa's imperial coronation on 18 June 1155, the Germans returned to their homes and the three Normans, still in rebellion, Robert of Capua, Andrew, and Robert of Loritello continued on. On the false report that William I of Sicily was dead, the three entered the Campania and successfully recovered all of their lands. But in May 1156, William countered. He defeated the rebels at Bari by the treason of Richard of Aquila. William then moved on Benevento, where Pope Adrian IV was sheltered by Robert of Militello and Andrew.

In June 1156, an agreement was reached between king and pope—the so-called Treaty of Benevento—whereby Robert of Loritello and Andrew, among others, were granted exile. Nonetheless, after withdrawing to the Abruzzi, Andrew rejoined Robert in returning to Apulia. He invaded Capua and Fondi in 1157. The Byzantine army left, but the pope sent reinforcements. At San Germano, now renamed Cassino, in January 1158, Andrew defeated the royal troops.

Andrew abandoned his newfound hold over Montecassino to defend his city of Ancona from Reginald of Dassel and Otto of Wittelsbach, generals of Barbarossa besieging the city. Peace was made before Spring was out and Andrew accompanied Reginald and Otto north to Milan and joined the ongoing siege under Barbarossa's command. He continued there until 7 September, when the city fell.

In 1161, Andrew rejoined Robert of Loritello again in rebellion against King William. The rebels burnt Butera but were forced to abandon their cause by the king's personal intervention. Andrew fled to Constantinople to beg for men and money but received none, for peace was established between Palermo and Byzantium. Andrew only reappears in 1167 assisted by Christian of Buch with imperial troops to repossess his fiefs, including Ancona. He failed. He was present at the Battle of Monte Porzio according to Romuald of Salerno.

== Sources ==
- Matthew, Donald. The Norman Kingdom of Sicily. Cambridge University Press: 1992.
