= Tillia gens =

Ancient Roman family

The gens Tillia, occasionally written Tilia, was a minor plebeian family at ancient Rome. Few members of this gens are mentioned in history, but others are known from inscriptions.

== Origin ==
The nomen Tillius did not originate at Rome, but appears to belong to one of the languages of northern Italy, such as Umbrian, or the languages of the Picentes or the Sabines. The nomen is frequently confused with the more common Tullius, which for this reason is sometimes substituted for it.

== Praenomina ==
The main praenomina of the Tillii were Marcus, Lucius, Gaius, and Publius, four of the most common names at all periods of Roman history. The remainder mostly used other common surnames, including Publius, Gnaeus, and Titus. The name Decimus is also found in a filiation.

== Branches and cognomina ==
The most famous cognomen of the Tillia gens was Cimber, borne by at least one, perhaps several members of a family that gained prominence in the Roman state toward the end of the Republic. This surname originally referred to one of the Cimbri, a Gaulish or Germanic people who fought against the Romans in Gaul and Spain at the end of the second century BC. Although such names frequently indicated the descent of the first bearer, it could also be that the cognomen was obtained by someone who in appearance or character was thought to resemble one of the Cimbri.

Another family of the Tillii bore the cognomen Rufus, one of the most common Latin surnames. Meaning "red" or "reddish", this name was typically bestowed on someone with red hair, although it might be inherited by a person's descendants without respect to the actual colour of their hair.

== Members ==
This list includes abbreviated praenomina. For an explanation of this practice, see filiation.

- Gnaeus Tillius, one of the aediles at Arpinum in Latium, responsible for building a tower and wall, dating between the middle of the second century BC, and the end of the first.
- Quintus Tillius Cimber, (Note: So named in Magistrates of the Roman Republic, but unclear whether he is thought to be the brother of Lucius who was expelled from the senate and exiled; Pauly-Wissowa does not assign him a surname, or consider him the brother.) a legate serving under Caesar during the Civil War in 48 BC. Caesar sent him, together with Lucius Canuleius, to acquire grain from Epirus.
- Lucius Tillius Cimber, praetor circa 45 BC, and the following year one of Caesar's assassins. At first a supporter of Caesar, Cimber joined the conspiracy against him for reasons that are not entirely clear. On the day of the murder, Cimber personally obstructed Caesar, first with a petition, then by seizing his garments, allowing the other assassins to strike. As governor of Bithynia and Pontus, Cimber raised a fleet, (Note: According to the letters of the so-called Pseudo-Brutus to Cicero, Cimber inflicted a defeat upon the consul Dolabella.) with which he supported his fellow conspirators Brutus and Cassius during their campaign in Macedonia.
- Tillia Cn. f., buried at Iguvium in Umbria, in a tomb dating from the latter half of the first century BC.
- Lucius Tillius L. l. Dionisius, a freedman buried at Dyrrachium in Macedonia, in a tomb dating between the middle of the first century BC and the middle of the first century AD.
- Tilia C. l. Flora, a freedwoman named in an inscription from Atina in Latium, along with a freedman and two freedwomen of the Pomponii, dating between the reign of Augustus and the middle of the first century AD.
- Marcus Tillius M. l. Silo, one of several freedmen named in an inscription from Rome, dating between 5 BC and AD 5.
- Gaius Tillius L. f., buried at Pompeii in Campania, in a family sepulchre built by his grandson, Lucius Tillius Rufus. His son, Gaius Tillius Rufus, was a duumvir and aedile at Arpinum, and grandsons Lucius and Gaius Tillius Rufus were military tribunes in the Legio X Equestris.
- Gaius Tillius C. f. L. n. Rufus, a duumvir and aedile at Arpinum, was buried at Pompeii, along with his wife, Fadia, father, Gaius Tillius, and son, Gaius Tillius Rufus, in a family sepulchre built by his son, Lucius Tillius Rufus. Both sons were military tribunes in the Legio X Equestris.
- Lucius Tillius C. f. C. n. Rufus, a former military tribune with the Legio X Equestris, was one of the duumvirs at Pompeii. He built a family sepulchre for his father, Gaius Cornelius Rufus, who had been duumvir and aedile at Arpinum; mother, Fadia; grandfather, Gaius Tillius; and brother, Gaius Tillius Rufus, a military tribune with the Legio X Equestris.
- Gaius Tillius C. f. C. n. Rufus, a military tribune with the Legio X Equestris, was buried in a family sepulchre built by his brother, Lucius Tillius Rufus, at Pompeii, for Gaius, his parents, Gaius Tillius Rufus and Fadia, and grandfather, Gaius Tillius. His brother was also a military tribune in the same legion, and later one of the duumvirs of Pompeii, while their father had been duumvir and aedile at Arpinum.
- Marcus Tillius M. l. Secunus, a freedman buried at Brundisium in Calabria, aged thirty-five, in a tomb dating between the late first century BC, and the middle of the first century AD.
- Gaius Tillius, buried at Larinum in Samnium, in a tomb built by his son, Lucius Tillius Trassa, dating from the early first century, along with his wife, Obinia, son, Gaius Tillius, grandson, Lucius Tillius, and Castrica, perhaps his granddaughter.
- Lucius Tillius C. f. Trassa, a centurion, built a tomb at Larinum, dating from the early first century, for his parents, Gaius Tillius and Obinia, brother, Gaius Tillius, son, Lucius Tillius, and Castricia, perhaps his daughter.
- Gaius Tillius C. f., the son of Gaius Tillius and Obinia, with whom he was buried in an early first-century tomb at Larinum, built by his brother, Lucius Tillius Trassa, for their parents, Gaius, his nephew Lucius Tillius, and Castricia, perhaps his niece.
- Lucius Tillius L. f. C. n, the son of Lucius Tillius Trassa, buried in an early first-century family sepulchre at Larinum, along with his grandparents, Lucius Tillius and Obinia, uncle, Gaius Tillius, and Castricia, perhaps his sister.
- Marcus Tillius Blastus, buried at Casilinum in Campania in a tomb built by Tillia Psyche, dating to the first half of the first century.
- Tillia Psyche, (Note: Spelled "Phsuche" in the original.) built a tomb at Casilinum, dating to the first half of the first century, for Marcus Tillius Blastus.
- Marcus Tillius, named in an inscription from Rome, dating from the first half of the first century.
- Marcus Tillius P. f., built a monument at Atina to Titus Helvius Basila, who had been aedile, praetor, and governor of Galatia late in the reign of Tiberius.
- Tillia, buried at Venafrum in Samnium, along with Gaius Teius Capito, and Lucius Maius Paetus, in a tomb built by one of her children, dating from the early or middle part of the first century.
- Publius Tillius Dexiades, a freedman, built a sepulchre at Nuceria in Campania, dating from the early or middle part of the first century, for himself, his colliberta, (Note: Colliberta: a woman freed on the same occasion (as Dexiades).) Syrtis, and the freedwoman Harmonia.
- Tillius, a potter whose maker's mark was found on a first-century piece of pottery from Virunum in Noricum.
- Marcus Tillius Amisenus, buried in a first-century tomb at Venafrum.
- Marcus Tillius Eros, named in a first-century inscription from Venafrum, along with Marcus Tilius Theuda, Felicio, Vitellia Callistes, Tillia Tertia, Marcus Tillius Gallus, Marcus Tillius Salvius, and Marcus Tillius Rufus.
- Marcus Tillius Gallus, named in a first-century inscription from Venafrum, along with Marcus Tilius Eros, Felicio, Vitellia Callistes, Tillia Tertia, Marcus Tillius Theuda, Marcus Tillius Salvius, and Marcus Tillius Rufus.
- Marcus Tillius [...]mus, buried in a first-century tomb at Venafrum.
- Tillia Primulla, the daughter of Nymphodotus, buried in a first-century tomb at Ammaedara in Africa Proconsularis, aged fifty.
- Tillius Faustillus, buried at Cales in Campania, in a first-century tomb built by Tillia Prisca for herself and Faustillus.
- Tillia Prisca, built a first-century tomb at Cales for herself and Tillius Faustillus.
- Marcus Tillius Rufus, named in a first-century inscription from Venafrum, along with Marcus Tilius Eros, Felicio, Vitellia Callistes, Tillia Tertia, Marcus Tillius Theuda, Marcus Tillius Salvius, and Marcus Tillius Gallus.
- Titus Tillius T. f. Sabinus, a centurion in the twelfth Urban Cohort at Rome, named in a first-century inscription, along with his concubine, Caninia Musa, and sister-in-law, Postumia Phyllis.
- Marcus Tillius Salvius, named in a first-century inscription from Venafrum, along with Marcus Tilius Eros, Felicio, Vitellia Callistes, Tillia Tertia, Marcus Tillius Theuda, Marcus Tillius Eros, and Marcus Tillius Rufus.
- Tillia Tertia, named in a first-century inscription from Venafrum, along with Marcus Tilius Eros, Felicio, Vitellia Callistes, Marcus Tillius Theuda, Marcus Tillius Gallus, Marcus Tillius Salvius, and Marcus Tillius Rufus.
- Marcus Tillius Theuda, named in a first-century inscription from Venafrum, along with Marcus Tilius Eros, Felicio, Vitellia Callistes, Tillia Tertia, Marcus Tillius Gallus, Marcus Tillius Salvius, and Marcus Tillius Rufus.
- Publius Tillius P. l. Dioscurus, one of the Seviri Augustales, buried at Aeclanum in Samnium, in the middle part of the first century.
- Gaius Tillius M. f. Vital[...], a soldier buried in a mid-first-century tomb at Hasta in Liguria.
- Quintus Tillius Eryllus, one of the officials at Larinum in Samnium, in an inscription dating from the middle or later part of the first century, along with Tillius Sassius, perhaps the member of the Arval Brethren.
- Tilia, dedicated a tomb at Valentia in Sardinia, dating from the latter half of the first century, for her husband, I[...]us Barecis, aged fifty-one.
- Quintus Tillius Sassius, a magistrate of the Arval Brethren at Rome, named in inscriptions dating from AD 62 to 91. He might be the same person named along with Quintus Tillius Eryllus in an inscription from Larinum.
- Lucius Tillius L. f. R[...], buried in a first- or second-century tomb at the present site of Montaquila, formerly part of Samnium, along with his wife, Maia Prisca.
- Quintus Tillius Figulianus, buried in a tomb at Rome, dating between the middle of the first century and the middle of the second, built by Magnia Tyche for herself, Figulianus, Titus Magnius Anicetus, and Titus Magnius Euthychus.
- Tillia M. l. Stacte, a freedwoman named in an inscription from Rome, dating between the middle of the first century and the middle of the second.
- Tillius D. l. Tertius, a freedman named along with his colliberta, Athenais, in an inscription from Rome dating between the middle of the first century and the middle of the second.
- Tillia Bremusa, buried at Rome, in a tomb built by Marcus Furius Charito, dating between the middle of the first century, and the end of the second.
- Marcus Tillius Celerianus, a youth buried at Rome, aged fourteen, in a tomb built by his mother, Tillia Philomene, dating between the late first century and the middle of the second.
- Tillia Philomene, built a tomb at Rome, dating between the late first century and the middle of the second, for her son, Marcus Tillius Celerianus.
- Tillia Q. f. Faustina, built a second-century tomb at Venafrum for her father, Quintus Tillius Faustus.
- Quintus Tillius Faustus, buried in a second-century tomb at Venafrum, built by his daughter, Tillia Faustina.
- Tillia Sarnia, the wife of Quintus Cassius Januarius, and mother of Quintus Cassius Martialis and Cassia Ostiensia. Her daughter built a second-century family sepulchre at Ostia for herself, her parents, and her brother.
- Lucius Tillius Restitutus, one of the quattuorviri at Aesernia in Samnium, in an uncertain year during the reign of Antoninus Pius.
- Tillia Eleusina, a freedwoman, built a tomb at Rome, dating from the middle part of the second century, for her husband, Quintus Tillius Verecundus.
- Quintus Tillius Verecundus, buried in a mid-second-century tomb at Rome, built by his wife, the freedwoman Tillia Eleusina.
- Marcus Tillius Januarius, dedicated a tomb at Rufrae in Samnium, dating from the middle or later part of the second century, for his wife, Herennia Afrodisia.
- Tilius, built a tomb at Ammaedara in Africa Proconsularis for his daughter, Tilia Concordia, dating between the middle of the second century and the middle of the third. He might be the same Tilius buried along with Concordia.
- Tilia Concordia, buried at Ammaedara, aged seventeen years, thirty days, in a tomb built by her father, Tilius, dating between the middle of the second century and the middle of the third.
- Tillia Eutychia, buried at Venafrum in Samnium, in a tomb built by Tillius Primus, dating between the middle of the second century and the middle of the third.
- Tillius Primus, built a tomb at Venafrum, dating between the middle of the second century and the middle of the third, for Tillia Eutychia.
- Marcus Tillius M. f. Rufus, a native of Atina, was a centurion primus pilus, who had served in the twelfth urban cohort, the first cohort of the vigiles, the Legio XX Valeria Victrix and the Legio XXII Primigenia, named in inscriptions from Atina in AD 208, and Mogontiacum in Germania Superior in 213.
- Tillius, named in a fourth-century inscription from Rome.

=== Undated Tillii ===
- Tiliia, built a tomb at Atina for her husband, Marcus Aerius.
- Tillia, dedicated a monument at Atina for Marcus Vibul[...].
- Tilius, buried at Forum Julii in Gallia Narbonensis.
- Tillius, one of the heirs of Opidius, according to an inscription from Rome.
- Lucius Tillius, named in an inscription from Nomentum in Latium.
- Lucius Tillius, named in an inscription from Interamna Lirenas in Latium.
- Tillius Bassus, built a tomb at Rome for his infant daughter, Felicissima, aged one year, eight months, and ten days.
- Gaius Tillius C. l. Cali[...], a freedman buried in a sepulchre built by the freedman Gaius Tillius Sabda at Atina for himself, Cali[...], and the freedwoman Tillia Hetaera.
- Tilius Canpanus, buried at Rusicade in Numidia, aged twenty-three.
- Tillia Ɔ. l Chelido, a freedwoman, dedicated a sepulchre at Atina for the family of the freedman Paccius.
- Marcus Tillius M. f. For[...], named in a sepulchral inscription from Atina.
- Tillia C. l. Hetaera, a freedwoman buried in a sepulchre at Atina, built by the freedman Gaius Tillius Sabda for himself, Hetaera, and the freedman Gaius Tillius Cali[...].
- Gnaeus Tillius Hym[...], built a tomb at Casinum in Latium for Lucceia Saturni[...].
- Tilius Impetratus, buried at Ammaedara, aged thirty-five, along with his young daughter, Tilia Stercula.
- Tillia M. l. Lucceia, named in a sepulchral inscription from Rome, along with Marcus Tillius Phanias.
- Tilia Materona, buried in a family sepulchre at Madaurus in Africa Proconsularis, aged twenty-three, along with Otacilia Bella, aged sixty-six. The tomb might have been built by Otacilia Kasta and Otacilius Titor, or they might also be buried there.
- Tillia Cn. f. Paulla, buried at Narbo in Gallia Narbonensis, along with Titus Sertorius Turpio.
- Marcus Tillius M. l. Phanias, named in a sepulchral inscription from Rome, along with Tillia Lucceia.
- Tilia Prepusa, a little girl buried at Rome, aged six.
- Tillia M. l. Prima, a freedwoman buried at Aquinum in Latium, along with the freedman and Sevir, Statius Vibius Andricus, apparently her husband.
- Publius Tillius T. f. Quintio, named in an inscription from Carteia in Hispania Baetica.
- Lucius Tillius L. f. R[...], named in an inscription from Volturnum in Campania, along with his wife, Maia Prisca.
- Gaius Tillius C. l. Sabda, a freedman, dedicated a tomb at Atina for himself, the freedman Gaius Tillius Cali[...], and the freedwoman Tillia Hetaera.
- Tilia C. f. Secunda, buried at Ateste in Venetia and Histria.
- Tilia Stercula, a little girl buried at Ammaedara, aged four, along with her father, Tilius Impetratus.
- Tilius Terentianus, named in an inscription from Rome.

== See also ==
- List of Roman gentes

== Bibliography ==
- Marcus Tullius Cicero, Epistulae ad Familiares, Philippicae.
- Gaius Julius Caesar, Commentarii de Bello Civili (Commentaries on the Civil War).
- Nicolaus Damascenus, The Life of Augustus.
- Lucius Annaeus Seneca (Seneca the Younger), De Ira (On Anger); Epistulae Morales ad Lucilium (Moral Letters to Lucilius).
- Appianus Alexandrinus (Appian), Bellum Civile (The Civil War).
- Theodor Mommsen et alii, Corpus Inscriptionum Latinarum (The Body of Latin Inscriptions, abbreviated CIL), Berlin-Brandenburgische Akademie der Wissenschaften (1853–present).
- Giovanni Battista de Rossi, Inscriptiones Christianae Urbis Romanae Septimo Saeculo Antiquiores (Christian Inscriptions from Rome of the First Seven Centuries, abbreviated ICUR), Vatican Library, Rome (1857–1861, 1888).
- Wilhelm Henzen, Ephemeris Epigraphica: Corporis Inscriptionum Latinarum Supplementum (Journal of Inscriptions: Supplement to the Corpus Inscriptionum Latinarum, abbreviated EE), Institute of Roman Archaeology, Rome (1872–1913).
- Gustav Wilmanns, Inscriptiones Africae Latinae (Latin Inscriptions from Africa), Georg Reimer, Berlin (1881).
- Ettore Pais, Corporis Inscriptionum Latinarum Supplementa Italica (Italian Supplement to the Corpus Inscriptionum Latinarum), Rome (1884).
- René Cagnat et alii, L'Année épigraphique (The Year in Epigraphy, abbreviated AE), Presses Universitaires de France (1888–present).
- August Pauly, Georg Wissowa, et alii, Realencyclopädie der Classischen Altertumswissenschaft (Scientific Encyclopedia of the Knowledge of Classical Antiquities, abbreviated RE or PW), J. B. Metzler, Stuttgart (1894–1980).
- George Davis Chase, "The Origin of Roman Praenomina", in Harvard Studies in Classical Philology, vol. VIII, pp. 103–184 (1897).
- Anna Gerstl, Supplementum Epigraphicum zu CIL III für Kärnten und Osttirol (Epigraphic Supplement to CIL III for Carinthia and East Tyrol), Vienna, (1902–1961).
- Stéphane Gsell, Inscriptions Latines de L'Algérie (Latin Inscriptions from Algeria), Edouard Champion, Paris (1922–present).
- Rivista di Archeologia Cristiana (Journal of Christian Archaeology), Pontificia Commissio de Sacra Archaeologia, Rome (1924–present).
- T. Robert S. Broughton, The Magistrates of the Roman Republic, American Philological Association (1952–1986).
- D.P. Simpson, Cassell's Latin and English Dictionary, Macmillan Publishing Company, New York (1963).
- Licia Vlad Borelli, Un Impegno per Pompei, Mailand (1983).
- Antonio M. Corda, Concordanze delle iscrizioni latine della Sardegna (Concordance of the Latin Inscriptions of Sardinia, abbreviated SRD), Ortacesus (2014).
