= Jimmy Cazzani =

Italian motorboat racer (born 1959)

Serafino Vincenzo A/K/A "Jimmy" Cazzani" was born in Sant'Angelo d'Alife, Italy. Cazzani is a Northeast Divisional Champion, North American Champion and National Offshore Powerboat Racing Champion.

As a young man Serafino became familiar with Ferrari and Lamborghini eight and twelve cylinder engines. As a technician and owner of these vehicles Cazzani was very familiar with the scream and power produced by these relatively small displacement motors.

In 1987 Jimmy was surprised when his race boat engine builder instructed him not to rev the engines beyond 5800 rpm. To Cazzani this made no sense. Jimmy dissected the engines and decided to change their internal geometry which would change their operational characteristics. The engine's internals were replaced with light, strong components. The change in operating range would require larger camshafts, better flowing cylinder heads, large volume intake manifolds and higher CFM (cubic foot per minute) carburetors. With the extra work produced by the new engine combination durability could become an issue but Cazzani kept the motors on a strict maintenance schedule and introduced lightweight, exotic titanium valvetrain components into the equation to ensure durability of these endurance racing motors.

Cazzani became one of the pioneering offshore racers to successfully utilize the high RPM potential of the Chevrolet Mark IV engines in an offshore racing vessel. His combination of short stroke / big bore contradicted the norm and permitted a significant leap in speeds and acceleration at a time when supercharging was prohibited by rule and displacement limited in The American Power Boat Association Offshore "D" class.

The high RPM low rotational mass motors Cazzani created propelled his team, The American Express, to consecutive Northeast Divisional and North American Championships on the APBA sanctioned Offshore Grand Prix Series in 1989 and 1990. Serafino "Jimmy" Cazzani was the team owner and Throttle Man. His crew included Lanny Delinger as driver/navigator, Carl Winsor as crew chief, Rob Votolato and Ray Regnaiere as crew members. He was the top finisher at Barnegat in 1989. In September, 2013, American Express again triumphed. Despite engine problems, they finished first in the D-class at the Irondequoit Sequicentennial Challenge. Jimmy Cazzani's accomplishments were chronicled in Propeller, Vapor Trails and Powerboat magazines. In 1990, when competing in Freeport New York, Cazzani also appeared as an off-set guest of The Today Show and has had considerable Sport Channel and ESPN coverage when competing on the ocean.

As of 2009, Cazzani is the technical director and a partner in M2 Motoryachts, a company currently prototyping an energy efficient high speed luxo cruiser and still involved in his automobile business, Passport Automotive Group located in Cranston, RI U.S.A.

Cazzani's speedboat

Cazzani is re-entering the fray after a long hiatus. He has teamed up with Herb Stotler Racing and will be competing in the Superboat Class of offshore racing in both the SBI and OPA circuits with a debut planned for August 2013. The new vessel is a Carbon Fiber 40 foot Platinum designed by Michael Peters and powered by twin 1250 h.p. Stotler Racing Engines. Cazzani will throttle the boat while Herb Stotler will handle the driving. For the 2013 Superboat International Key West World Championships, Scuderia Cazzani entered into a marketing agreement with Alex And Ani that included a third-place finish in the final event. This relationship continued in 2015 at the International Key West Offshore World Championship. The Cazzani team is currently sponsored by ALEX AND ANI. They are manufacturers of meaningful, inspiring products.

In September 2015 he competed at the Super Boat International National championships in Clearwater, Florida. Serafino currently pilots the Scuderia Cazzani UIM Class One Catamaran on the OPA Racing circuit. These Class One Catamarans are the largest and fastest Race Boats in the world. Class 1 includes teams and pilots from the United States, Australia, New Zealand, Great Britain, Italy, UAE, Qatar and Norway.
