= Fontegreca =

- Comune
- Comune di Fontegreca
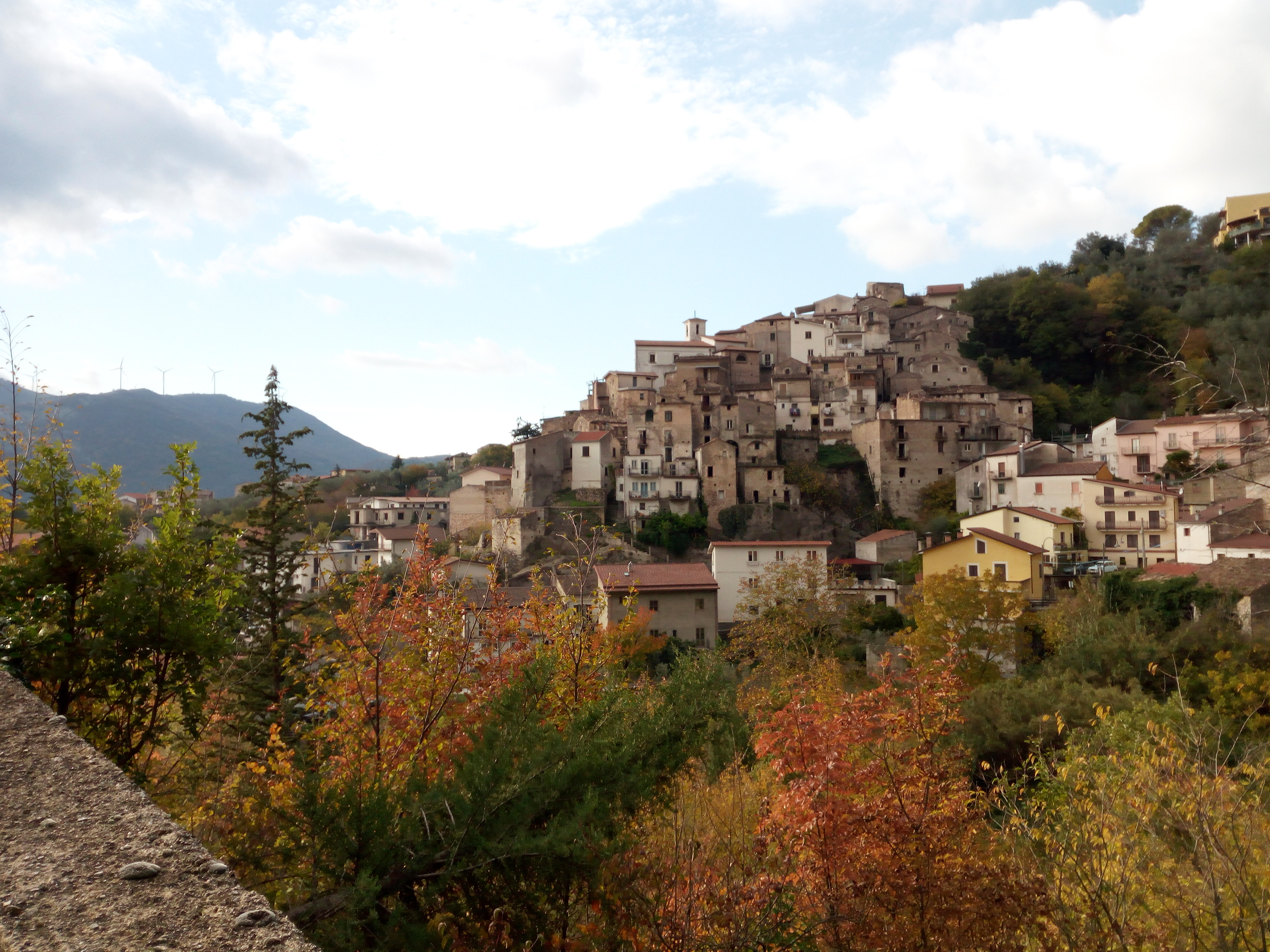

- Coat of arms

- Location within Italy Location within Campania
- Coordinates: 41°27′N 14°11′E
- Country: Italy
- Region: Campania
- Province: Caserta (CE)

Government
  - Mayor: Antonio Montoro

Area
  - Total: 9.71 km^{2} (3.75 sq mi)
- Elevation: 320 m (1,050 ft)

Population (31 March 2017)
  - Total: 792
  - Density: 81.6/km^{2} (211/sq mi)
- Demonym: Fontegregani
- Time zone: UTC+1 (CET)
  - Summer (DST): UTC+2 (CEST)
- Postal code: 81010
- Dialing code: 0823
- Patron saint: St. Stephen
- Saint day: 3 August
- Website: Official website

Fontegreca (Campanian: Fossacèca) is a comune (municipality) in the Province of Caserta in the Italian region Campania, located about 70 kilometres (43 mi) north of Naples and about 45 kilometres (28 mi) northwest of Caserta.

Fontegreca borders the following municipalities: Capriati a Volturno, Ciorlano, Gallo Matese, Prata Sannita.
