= Sesto Campano =

- Comune
- Comune di Sesto Campano
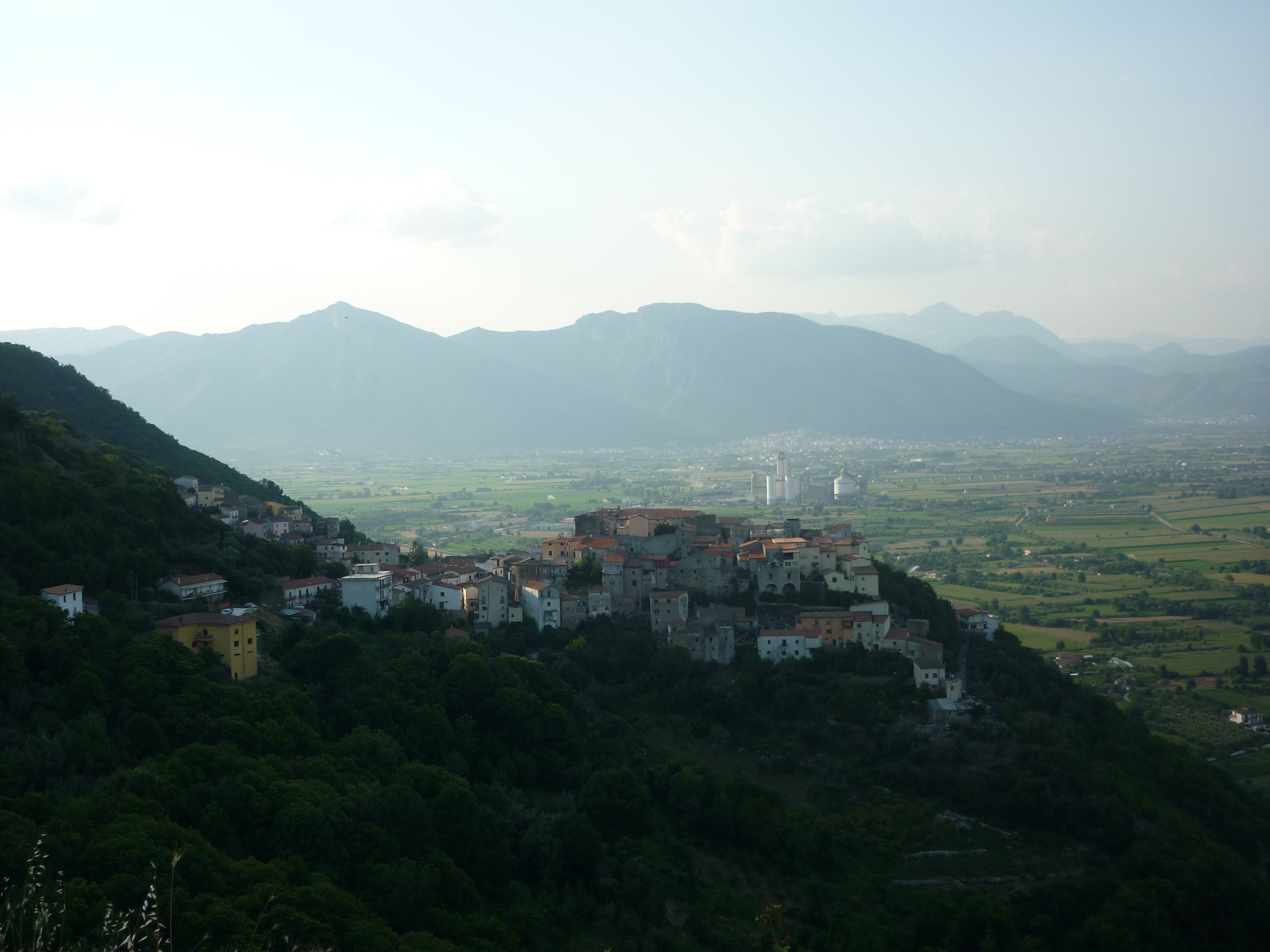
- View of Sesto Campano

- Coat of arms

- Sesto Campano within the Province of Isernia

- Location within Italy Location within Molise
- Coordinates: 41°25′N 14°5′E
- Country: Italy
- Region: Molise
- Province: Isernia (IS)
- Frazioni: Roccapipirozzi

Government
  - Mayor: Luigi Paolone

Area
  - Total: 36.6 km^{2} (14.1 sq mi)

Population (30 September 2016)
  - Total: 2,387
  - Density: 65.2/km^{2} (169/sq mi)
- Demonym: Sestolesi
- Time zone: UTC+1 (CET)
  - Summer (DST): UTC+2 (CEST)
- Postal code: 86078
- Dialing code: 0865
- Website: Official website

Sesto Campano is a comune (municipality) in the Province of Isernia in the Italian region Molise, located about 50 kilometres (31 mi) southwest of Campobasso and about 25 kilometres (16 mi) southwest of Isernia.

The municipality is located in the south of its province, close to the borders of Molise with Campania and Lazio. It borders with the municipality Venafro and four others belonging to the Province of Caserta: Ciorlano, Mignano Monte Lungo, Pratella and Presenzano.
