= San Gregorio Matese =

- Comune
- Comune di San Gregorio Matese
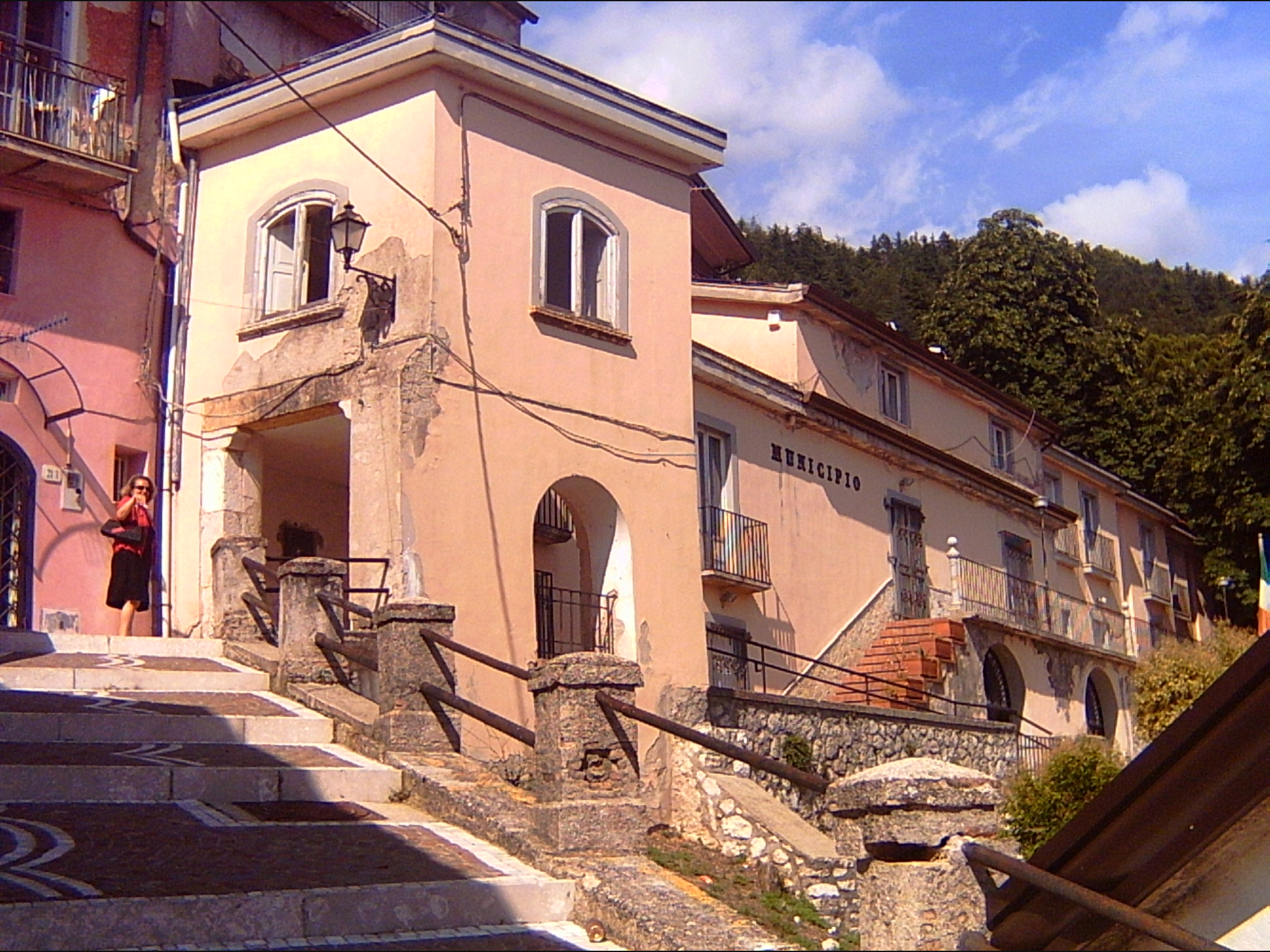
- Town hall.

- Location within Italy Location within Campania
- Coordinates: 41°23′N 14°22′E
- Country: Italy
- Region: Campania
- Province: Caserta (CE)

Government
  - Mayor: Giuseppe Carmine Mallardo

Area
  - Total: 56.51 km^{2} (21.82 sq mi)
- Elevation: 765 m (2,510 ft)

Population (31 March 2017)
  - Total: 957
  - Density: 16.9/km^{2} (43.9/sq mi)
- Demonym: Sarrocchi or Sarrocci
- Time zone: UTC+1 (CET)
  - Summer (DST): UTC+2 (CEST)
- Postal code: 81010
- Dialing code: 0823
- Website: Official website

San Gregorio Matese is a comune (municipality) in the Province of Caserta in the Italian region Campania, located about 60 kilometres (37 mi) north of Naples and about 35 kilometres (22 mi) north of Caserta.

San Gregorio Matese borders the following municipalities: Bojano, Campochiaro, Castello del Matese, Letino, Piedimonte Matese, Raviscanina, Roccamandolfi, San Massimo, San Polo Matese, Sant'Angelo d'Alife, Valle Agricola.
