= Adriana Giramonti =

Italian-American chef (1929–2016)

- Born: Adriana Silvestri; May 25, 1929; Presenzano, Italy
- Died: June 6, 2016 (aged 87); San Rafael, California, U.S.
- Spouse: Nino Giramonti
- Culinary career
- Previous restaurant(s): Giramonti's; Adriana's
- Television show(s): Great Chefs

Adriana Giramonti (1929–2016) was an Italian-American chef who co-founded restaurant Giramonti's in Mill Valley, California in 1977.

== Early life and education ==
Adriana Silvestri was born on May 24, 1929, in Presenzano, Italy. Her parents were Clotilde Pascale and Umberto Silvestri. Silvestri was one of five siblings. The family lived in a village near Monte Cassino. The village was occupied by the Germans during World War II. The Germans ransacked the village for food and supplies. The family was frequently hungry as a result of the occupation. When she was a child she painted and won an art competition. Her prize was a kiss on the cheek from Mussolini.

After World War II, the family moved to Rome. Silvestri's parents taught her how to cook, preparing simple meals for their large family using produce and ingredients from local Roman markets. The young Silvestri was a childhood friend of Sophia Loren, a relationship that would sustain throughout their lives. The family spent their summers in Nettuno.

Silvestri moved to San Francisco in 1956, settling in the North Beach, San Francisco neighbourhood. She sought to become a teacher, but was unable to find a job in the education field.

== Career and life ==
Silvestri began working in the kitchen at an Italian restaurant called Little Joe's. She met Nino Giramonti, who waited tables at various restaurants. The couple would eventually marry and have two sons.

After fifteen years of working at Little Joe's, Adriana Giramonti, alongside Nino, considered buying Little Joe's, which changed ownership a number of times when Giramonti worked there. However, the couple decided to start new and opened their namesake restaurant Giramonti's, in Mill Valley, California in 1977. The restaurant overlooked Richardson Bay. The menu focused on Roman cuisine. SPQR was the theme - with menus and signage at the restaurant displaying the motto of ancient Rome. The restaurant was reviewed positively in Gourmet in 1981. In 1983, Giramonti was featured on Great Chefs. Three years later, in 1986, Clint Eastwood described Giramonti's as being not "pretty" but serving "some of the best food in the Bay Area." Dishes on the menu included Roman-style artichokes, Empress mushrooms, crostini with chicken livers, marinated eggplant, linguine with prawns, and veal in mustard cream sauce. For her veal, Giramoti sourced local, avoiding mass raised synthetically fed veal. The San Francisco Examiner called Giramonti a "master chef" and called it, alongside Ondine, "Marin's most favored dinner houses" in 1981.

Giramonti opened Adriana's in San Rafael, California in 1985. As of 1992, Adriana's served 100 meals daily and grossed $1 million annually. She appeared regularly on the morning news program on KGO-TV.

During her career, Giramonti never called herself "chef" choosing to refer to herself as a cook. She acknowledged that there were not many women being celebrated as chefs during the 1980s. Giramonti believed that women chefs were more creative and experimental than male chefs. She worked five days a week, starting in the kitchen at 10 a.m.

== Later life and legacy ==
Giramonti taught her grandchildren how to cook, with gnocchi being a favorite dish of the children. She also continued painting throughout her entire life, displaying her own paintings in her house.

Giramonti died on June 6, 2016, in San Rafael.
