= Roccapipirozzi =

- Frazione
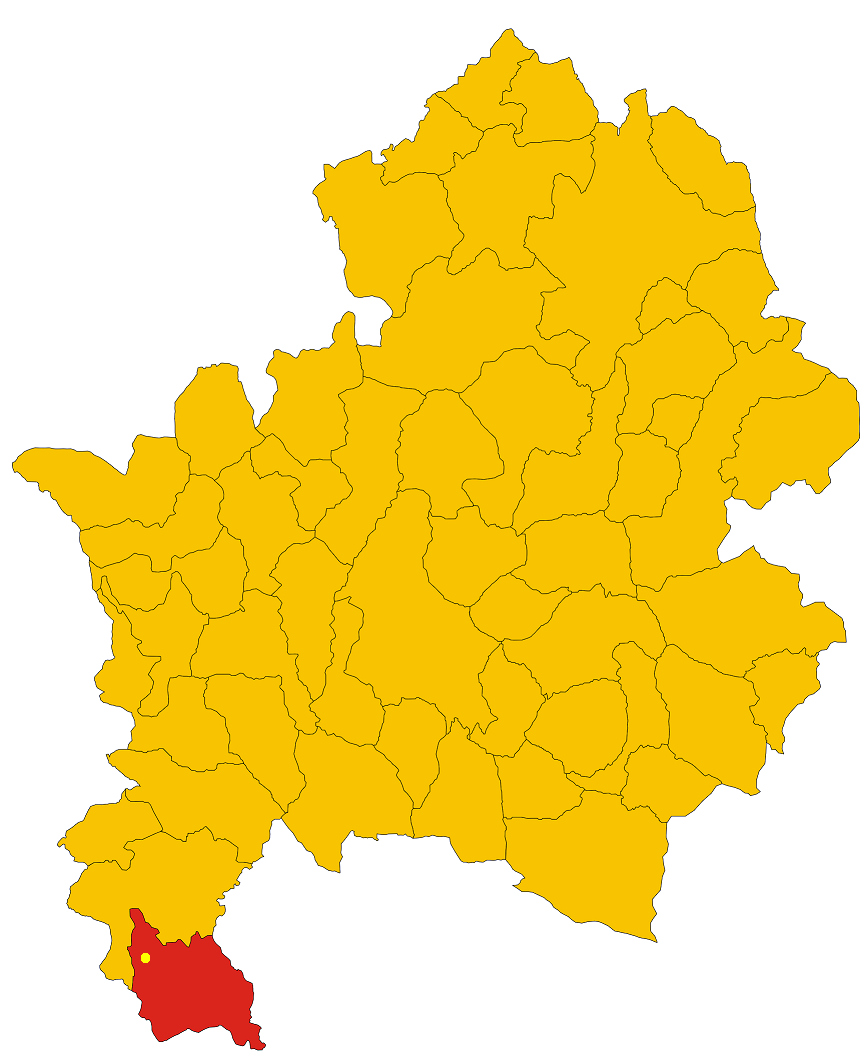
- Roccapipirozzi (yellow dot) shown within the municipality of Sesto Campano (dark red) and the Province of Isernia

- Location of Roccapipirozzi in Italy
- Coordinates: 41°26′09.42″N 14°01′57.4″E
- Country: Italy
- Region: Molise
- Province: Isernia (IS)
- Comune: Sesto Campano
- Elevation: 437 m (1,434 ft)

Population (2009)
  - Total: 1,045
- Demonym: Roccolani
- Time zone: UTC+1 (CET)
  - Summer (DST): UTC+2 (CEST)
- Postal code: 86078
- Dialing code: 0865
- Patron saint: Saint Roch of Montpellier

Roccapipirozzi is an Italian village, hamlet (frazione) of the municipality of Sesto Campano in the Province of Isernia, Molise. As of 2009 its population was of 1,045.

== History ==
The village, founded by the refugees from Venafro, was first mentioned as Rocca Piperocii in the 13th century. The fortification and the old town are well preserved.

== Geography ==
Roccapipirozzi, located near the borders with Lazio and Campania, lies into a valley below the mounts Cesima, Calvello and Sambucaro. It is 6 km far from Sesto Campano, 5 km from Venafro, 12 from San Pietro Infine, 26 from Isernia and 24 from Cassino. Nearest villages Vallecupa and Ceppagna, part of the municipality of Venafro.

The settlement is divided into 2 sides:

- Roccapipirozzi Alta (i.e. :Upper R., 41°26′09.42″N 14°01′57.4″E) is the original and historic core of the village, located upon a hill. It counts a medieval castle and the population was of 217.
- Roccapipirozzi Bassa (i.e. :Lower R., 41°26′24.73″N 14°02′30.88″E), also known as Campopino or Masserie di Roccapipirozzi, is the newer side of the village, located in the plain below. Its population was of 828.
