= Presenzano =

- Comune
- Comune di Presenzano
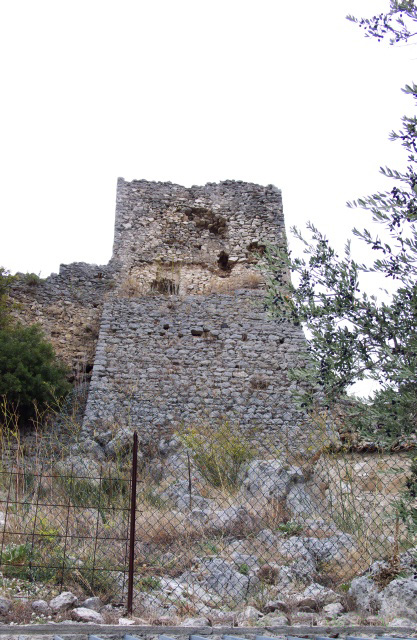
- Remains of the Norman castle.

- Location within Italy Location within Campania
- Coordinates: 41°23′N 14°5′E
- Country: Italy
- Region: Campania
- Province: Caserta (CE)

Government
  - Mayor: Andrea Maccarelli

Area
  - Total: 31.7 km^{2} (12.2 sq mi)
- Elevation: 350 m (1,150 ft)

Population (31 December 2015)
  - Total: 1,766
  - Density: 55.7/km^{2} (144/sq mi)
- Demonym: Presenzanesi
- Time zone: UTC+1 (CET)
  - Summer (DST): UTC+2 (CEST)
- Postal code: 81050
- Dialing code: 0823
- Website: Official website

Presenzano (Campanian: Presenzànë) is a comune (municipality) in the Province of Caserta in the Italian region Campania, located about 60 kilometres (37 mi) north of Naples and about 40 kilometres (25 mi) northwest of Caserta.

Presenzano borders the following municipalities: Conca della Campania, Marzano Appio, Mignano Monte Lungo, Pratella, Sesto Campano, Tora e Piccilli, Vairano Patenora.

== Notable people ==
- Adriana Giramonti - chef
