= Matese =

Chain of mountains in southern Italy

Monti del Matese
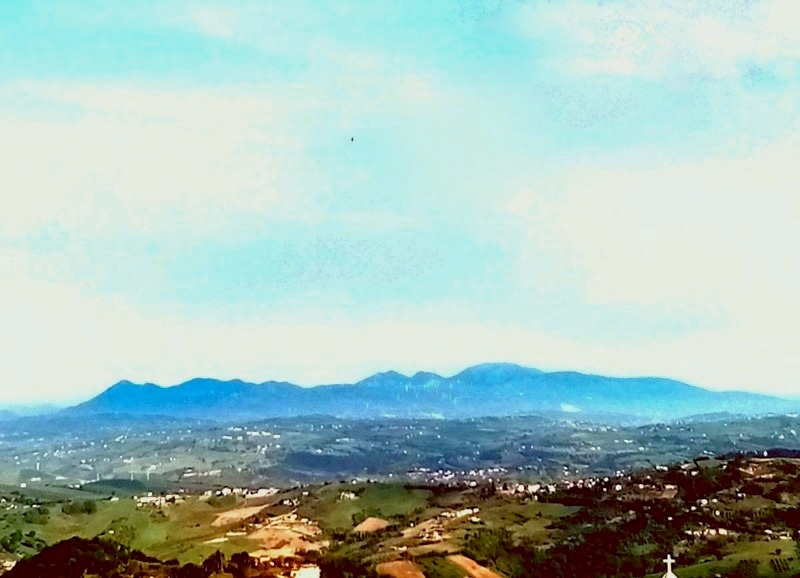
- Matese chain viewed from Ariano Irpino

Highest point
- Elevation: 2,050 m (6,730 ft) (Monte Miletto)
- Coordinates: 41°40′N 14°40′E

Geography
- Location: Molise and Campania, Italy
- Parent range: central-southern Apennines

The Matese (Italian: Monti del Matese or Massiccio del Matese) is a chain of mountains in southern Apennines, southern Italy.

== Geography ==
The Matese mountains straddle two regions (Molise and Campania) and four provinces (Campobasso, Isernia, Benevento and Caserta). The highest peak, on the boundary between Molise and Campania, is the Monte Miletto, at 2,050 m, followed by La Gallinola (1,923 m a.s.l.), Monte Mutria (1,823 m a.s.l.), Monte Monaco di Gioia and Monte Maio.

Westwards, it faces the middle valley of the Volturno River towards the Monti Trebulani, while eastwards it faces the Molisan Pre-Apennines; northwards it is bounded by the Mainarde chain and, from the south, by the Camposauro and Taburno mountains. From north to south, the massif has an extension of some 60 km, while from east to west it measures some 25 km. They are included in the regional Park of the Matese, and include a lake of glacial origin (Lake Matese), two artificial lakes (lakes of Gallo Matese and Letino, formed by a dam on the Lete River), as well as the ski resorts of Bocca della Selva and Campitello Matese.

== History ==
The area of the Matese was inhabited in historic times by the Samnites, who were conquered by the Romans in the 3rd-2nd centuries BC. Later it was a center of monasticism.

In the 7th century some villages in the area (Gallo Matese, Sepino, Boiano) were settled by a small Bulgar horde led by Alcek.

In the early 19th century it was a shelter for the anti-French partisans who were fighting against the French King of Naples, Joachim Murat. After the unification of Italy (1861), they became the base for anti-Piedmontese brigands, including both criminals and former Neapolitan soldiers organized in bands counting up to 600 men.

In the late 19th century, La Banda del Matese, a group of 26 anarchists and republicans from the Italian First International, waged an insurrectionary campaign to disrupt operations in the region and show their group's dedication to sociopolitical change.

== Flora and fauna ==
Flora include beech at middle altitudes and fir at higher ones, while on lower altitudes it includes birch, juniper, oak, chestnut and, more southwards, woods of holm oak.

Wildlife includes several examples of italian wolf, roe deer and eagle.

== See also ==
- Campitello Matese
- Castello del Matese
- Gallo Matese
- Piedimonte Matese
- San Gregorio Matese
- San Polo Matese
