= Conca della Campania =

- Comune
- Comune di Conca della Campania
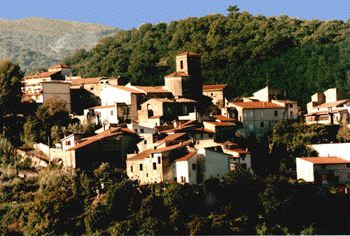

- Location within Italy Location within Campania
- Coordinates: 41°19′58″N 13°59′23″E
- Country: Italy
- Region: Campania
- Province: Caserta (CE)

Government
  - Mayor: David Lucio Simone

Area
  - Total: 26.6 km^{2} (10.3 sq mi)
- Elevation: 420 m (1,380 ft)

Population (30 June 2017)
  - Total: 1,203
  - Density: 45.2/km^{2} (117/sq mi)
- Demonym: Concani or Concanesi
- Time zone: UTC+1 (CET)
  - Summer (DST): UTC+2 (CEST)
- Postal code: 81044
- Dialing code: 0823

Conca della Campania (Campanian: Cónga Cambania) is a comune (municipality) in the Province of Caserta in the Italian region Campania, located about 60 kilometres (37 mi) northwest of Naples and about 40 kilometres (25 mi) northwest of Caserta.

Conca della Campania borders the following municipalities: Galluccio, Marzano Appio, Mignano Monte Lungo, Presenzano, Roccamonfina, Tora e Piccilli.
