= Tora e Piccilli =

- Comune
- Comune di Tora e Piccilli
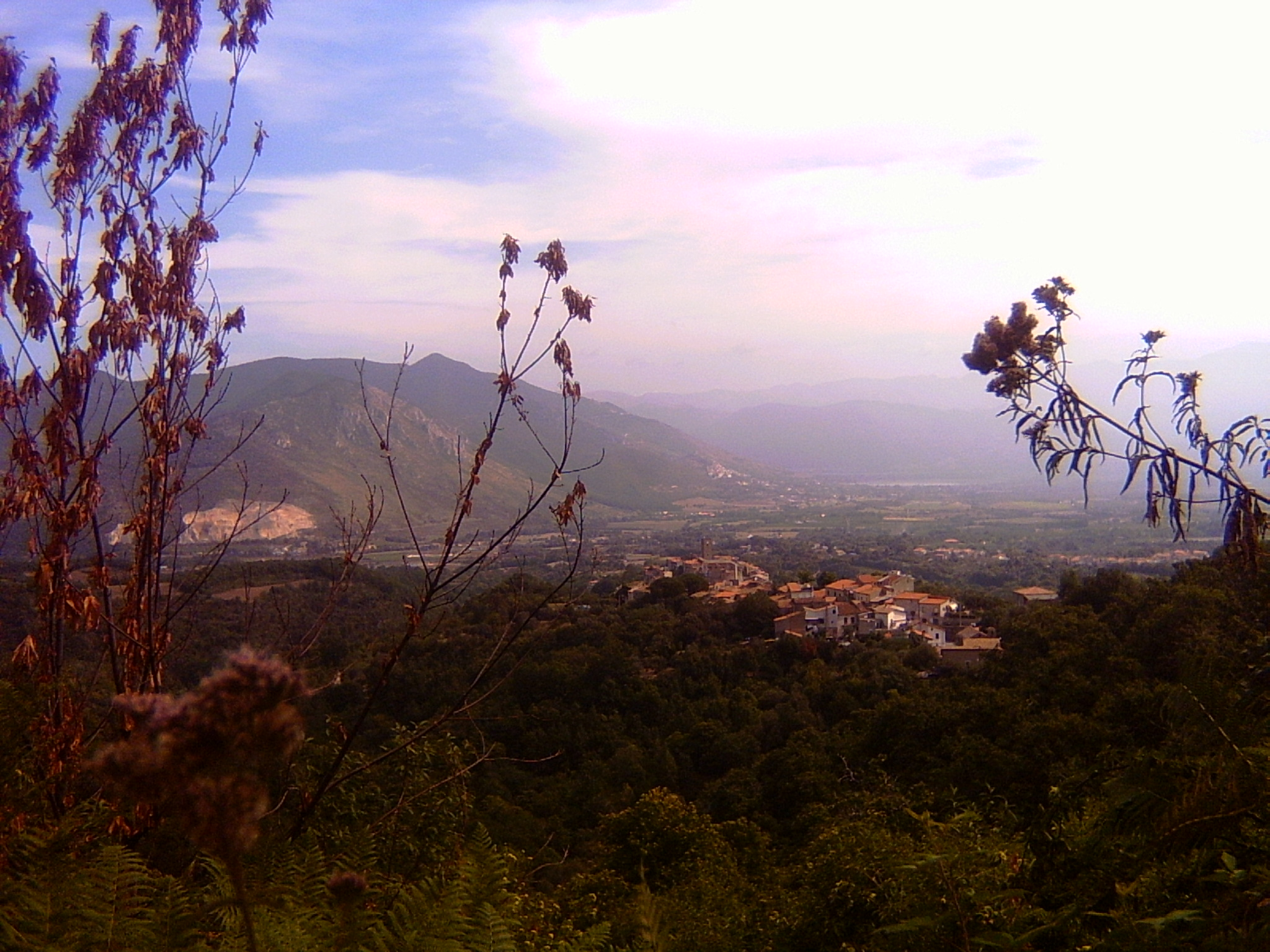
- View of Tora.

- Location within Italy Location within Campania
- Coordinates: 41°20′N 14°1′E
- Country: Italy
- Region: Campania
- Province: Caserta (CE)

Government
  - Mayor: Natascia Valentino

Area
  - Total: 12.5 km^{2} (4.8 sq mi)
- Elevation: 343 m (1,125 ft)

Population (31 December 2015)
  - Total: 910
  - Density: 73/km^{2} (190/sq mi)
- Demonym(s): Torani and Piccilesi
- Time zone: UTC+1 (CET)
  - Summer (DST): UTC+2 (CEST)
- Postal code: 81050
- Dialing code: 0823

Tora e Piccilli is a comune (municipality) in the Province of Caserta in the Italian region Campania, located about 60 kilometres (37 mi) northwest of Naples and about 40 kilometres (25 mi) northwest of Caserta.

Tora e Piccilli borders the following municipalities: Conca della Campania, Marzano Appio, Presenzano.
