= Caianello =

- Comune
- Comune di Caianello
- Location within Italy Location within Campania
- Coordinates: 41°18′N 14°5′E
- Country: Italy
- Region: Campania
- Province: Caserta (CE)

Government
  - Mayor: Marino Feroce

Area
  - Total: 15.6 km^{2} (6.0 sq mi)
- Elevation: 236 m (774 ft)

Population (30 April 2017)
  - Total: 1,871
  - Density: 120/km^{2} (311/sq mi)
- Demonym: Caianellesi
- Time zone: UTC+1 (CET)
  - Summer (DST): UTC+2 (CEST)
- Postal code: 81040
- Dialing code: 0823
- Patron saint: St. Michael Archangel
- Saint day: 29 September
- Website: Official website

Caianello is a comune (municipality) in the Province of Caserta in the Italian region Campania, located about 50 kilometres (31 mi) northwest of Naples and about 35 kilometres (22 mi) northwest of Caserta.

Caianello borders the following municipalities: Marzano Appio, Roccamonfina, Teano, Vairano Patenora.
