= Ciorlano =

- Comune
- Comune di Ciorlano
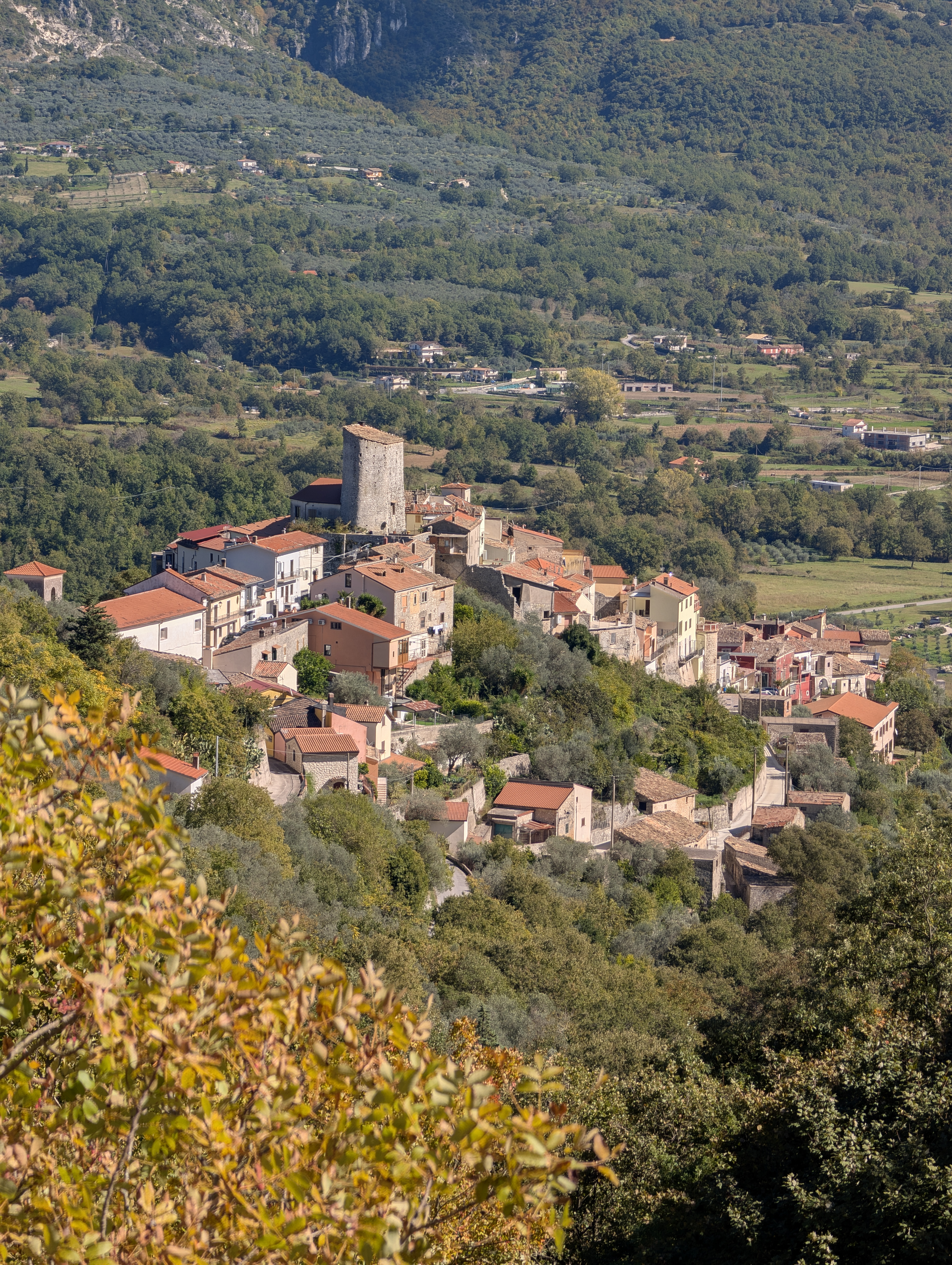
- La torre e il borgo di Ciorlano visti da via Annunziata

- Location within Italy Location within Campania
- Coordinates: 41°27′N 14°10′E
- Country: Italy
- Region: Campania
- Province: Caserta (CE)

Government
  - Mayor: Mauro Di Stefano

Area
  - Total: 28.65 km^{2} (11.06 sq mi)
- Elevation: 330 m (1,080 ft)

Population (31 August 2017)
  - Total: 431
  - Density: 15.0/km^{2} (39.0/sq mi)
- Demonym: Ciorlanesi
- Time zone: UTC+1 (CET)
  - Summer (DST): UTC+2 (CEST)
- Postal code: 81010
- Dialing code: 0823
- Website: Official website

Ciorlano is a comune (municipality) in the Province of Caserta in the Italian region Campania, located about 70 km (43 mi) north of Naples and about 45 km (28 mi) northwest of Caserta.

Ciorlano borders the following municipalities: Capriati a Volturno, Fontegreca, Prata Sannita, Pratella, Sesto Campano, Venafro.
