= Monte Mutria =

Mountain in Italy

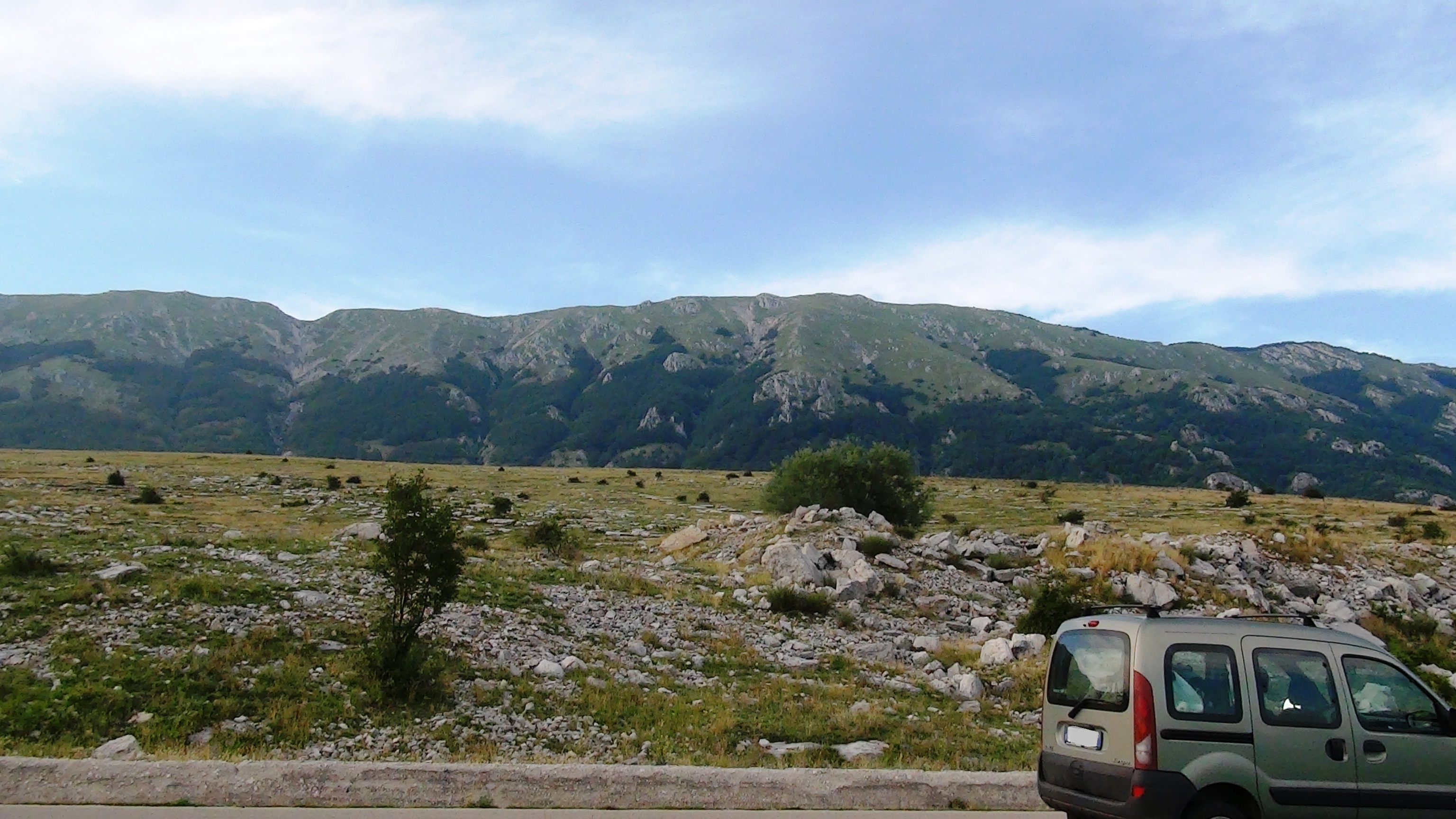

Highest point
- Elevation: 1,822 m (5,978 ft)
- Prominence: 548 m (1,798 ft)
- Coordinates: 41°23′06″N 14°31′24″E

Geography
- Location within Italy
- Location: Molise and Campania, Italy
- Parent range: Monti del Matese, central-southern Apennines

The Monte Mutria is a mountain in the Matese mountain range, part of the central-southern Apennines, southern Italy. Having an altitude of 1,822 m, it is located in the eastern part of the massif, on the boundary between Molise and Campania.

Its peak commands the valleys of the rivers Tammaro eastwards, Calore Irpino southwards, Volturno westwards, and both the Tyrrhennian and the Adriatic Seas are visible from it. In ancient times, it was a sacred place to the Italic tribe of the Samnites.

The Molisan side has wide woods of pines and beeches, while the Campanians' side is more rocky, with parts characterized by Karst topography.
