= Marzano Appio =

- Comune
- Comune di Marzano Appio
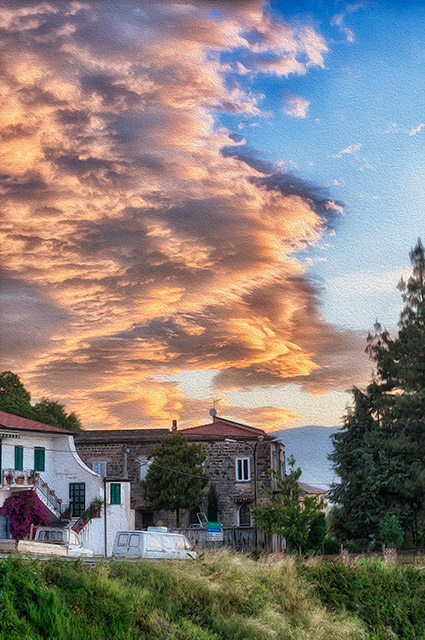

- Location within Italy Location within Campania
- Coordinates: 41°18′N 14°2′E
- Country: Italy
- Region: Campania
- Province: Caserta (CE)

Government
  - Mayor: Unknown

Area
  - Total: 28.2 km^{2} (10.9 sq mi)
- Elevation: 318 m (1,043 ft)

Population (30 September 2017)
  - Total: 2,212
  - Density: 78.4/km^{2} (203/sq mi)
- Demonym: Marzanesi
- Time zone: UTC+1 (CET)
  - Summer (DST): UTC+2 (CEST)
- Postal code: 81048
- Dialing code: 0823
- Patron saint: St. Anthony of Padua
- Saint day: 24 Luglio
- Website: Official website

Marzano Appio is a comune (municipality) in the Province of Caserta in the Italian region Campania, located about 50 kilometres (31 mi) northwest of Naples and about 35 kilometres (22 mi) northwest of Caserta.

Marzano Appio borders the following municipalities: Caianello, Conca della Campania, Presenzano, Roccamonfina, Tora e Piccilli, Vairano Patenora.
