= Capriati a Volturno =

- Comune
- Comune di Capriati a Volturno
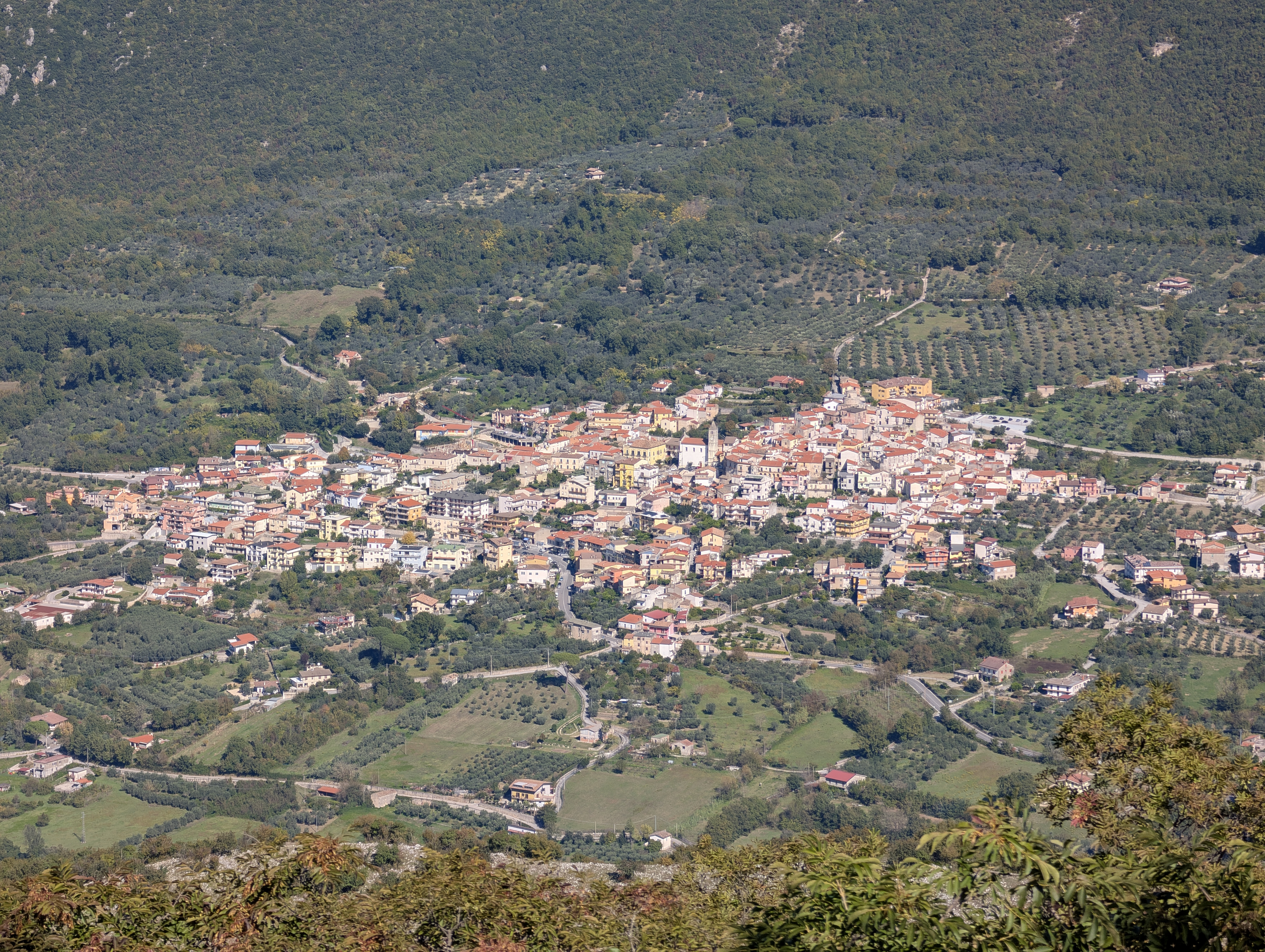

- Coat of arms

- Location within Italy Location within Campania
- Coordinates: 41°28′N 14°9′E
- Country: Italy
- Region: Campania
- Province: Caserta (CE)

Government
  - Mayor: Giovanni Prato

Area
  - Total: 18.39 km^{2} (7.10 sq mi)
- Elevation: 226 m (741 ft)

Population (31 March 2017)
  - Total: 1,533
  - Density: 83.36/km^{2} (215.9/sq mi)
- Demonym: Capriatesi
- Time zone: UTC+1 (CET)
  - Summer (DST): UTC+2 (CEST)
- Postal code: 81014
- Dialing code: 0823
- Website: Official website

Capriati a Volturno is a comune (municipality) in the Province of Caserta in the Italian region Campania, located about 70 km (43 mi) north of Naples and about 45 km (28 mi) northwest of Caserta.

Capriati a Volturno borders the following municipalities: Ciorlano, Fontegreca, Gallo Matese, Monteroduni, Pozzilli, Venafro.
