= La Gallinola =

Mountain in Campania

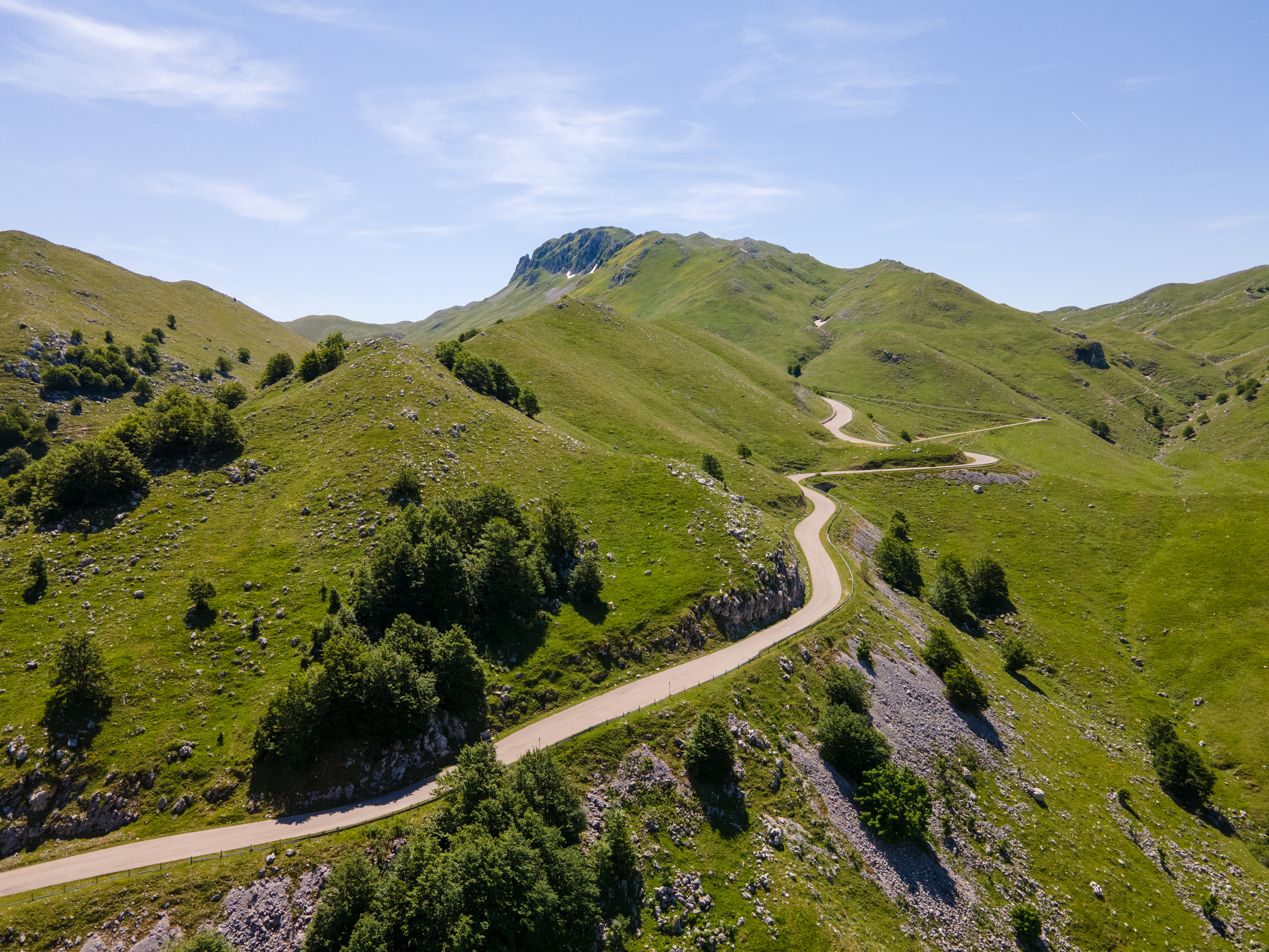

Highest point
- Elevation: 1,923 m (6,309 ft)
- Prominence: 343 m (1,125 ft)
- Isolation: 4.27 km (2.65 mi)
- Listing: List of Italian regions by highest point
- Coordinates: 41°26′3″N 14°25′18″E

Geography
- Location within Italy
- Location: Campania and Molise, Italy
- Parent range: Matese

La Gallinola is among the highest peaks of the Matese, the highest mountain in Campania, located on the Apennines ridge between Campania and Molise.

The environment is karst, with persistent grass and without large trees, as expected on the summit of a carbonate massif.
