= Ailano =

- Comune
- Comune di Ailano
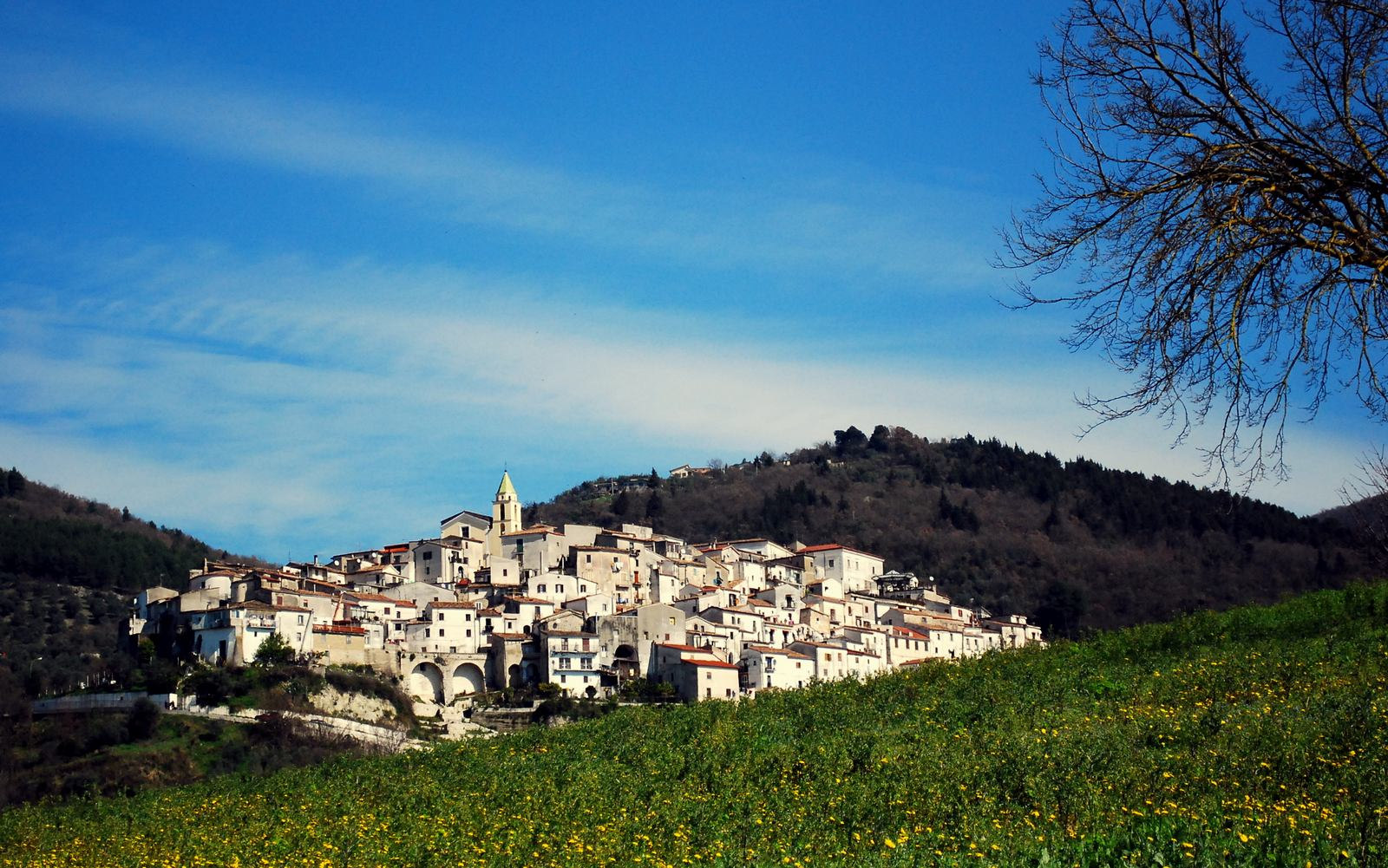
- View of Ailano

- Location of Ailano in Italy Ailano (Campania)
- Coordinates: 41°23′N 14°12′E
- Country: Italy
- Region: Campania
- Province: Caserta (CE)

Government
  - Mayor: Vincenzo Lanzone

Area
  - Total: 16.06 km^{2} (6.20 sq mi)
- Elevation: 260 m (850 ft)

Population (31 March 2017)
  - Total: 1,339
  - Density: 83.37/km^{2} (215.9/sq mi)
- Demonym: Ailanesi
- Time zone: UTC+1 (CET)
  - Summer (DST): UTC+2 (CEST)
- Postal code: 81010
- Dialing code: 0823
- Patron saint: St. John the Evangelist
- Website: Official website

Ailano is a comune (municipality) in the Province of Caserta in the Italian region Campania, located about 60 kilometres (37 mi) north of Naples and about 35 kilometres (22 mi) northwest of Caserta.

The municipality is served by State Road 158 of the Volturno Valley and by provincial roads 83 (Ailano – Valle Agricola), 96 (of Vairano Patenora), 149, 207, 274, and 281.

== History ==
The municipal territory of Ailano has been inhabited since the Neolithic period, as evidenced by sporadic archaeological findings. The historian Philipp Clüver (Filippo Cluverio) mentioned the Roman village of Aebutianum in his research, although no archaeological traces of it have been found.

The Tabula Peutingeriana, in its section "pars VII", lists a village named Ebutiana, located 9 Roman miles north of Adlefas (modern-day Alife) and south of Cluturno (between Capriati a Volturno and Monteroduni), to the east of the Campanian Apennines. These cross-referenced locations seem to support at least a rough identification of present-day Ailano with the ancient Aebutianum.

With the arrival of the Normans, a fortified settlement emerged, referred to in documents first as Athilanum and later Aylanum, falling under the influence of the Norman County of Alife.

Ailano was a fief of the Aquino family (1229), followed by the De Arguth (1266), De Fossis (1285), Rapa (1320), and Gualando (or Galardo, 1536) families. The last feudal lords were the Carafa, De Penna, Matteo, Carbonelli, and finally the Rajola Pescarini family, who held the fief from 1733.

With the abolition of feudalism, the feudal commission granted ownership of the Cimogna and Coppola mountains to the municipality.

During World War II, German troops entrenched themselves behind the Cerrito and Calégna hills, where they resisted the American advance for several days. Fearing the worst, the local population fled to the surrounding mountains. After sustained shelling, American forces entered Ailano on 28 October 1943.

In 1927, Ailano was annexed to the province of Benevento; in 1945, it was returned to the newly reestablished province of Caserta.
