= Vairano Patenora =

- Comune
- Comune di Vairano Patenora
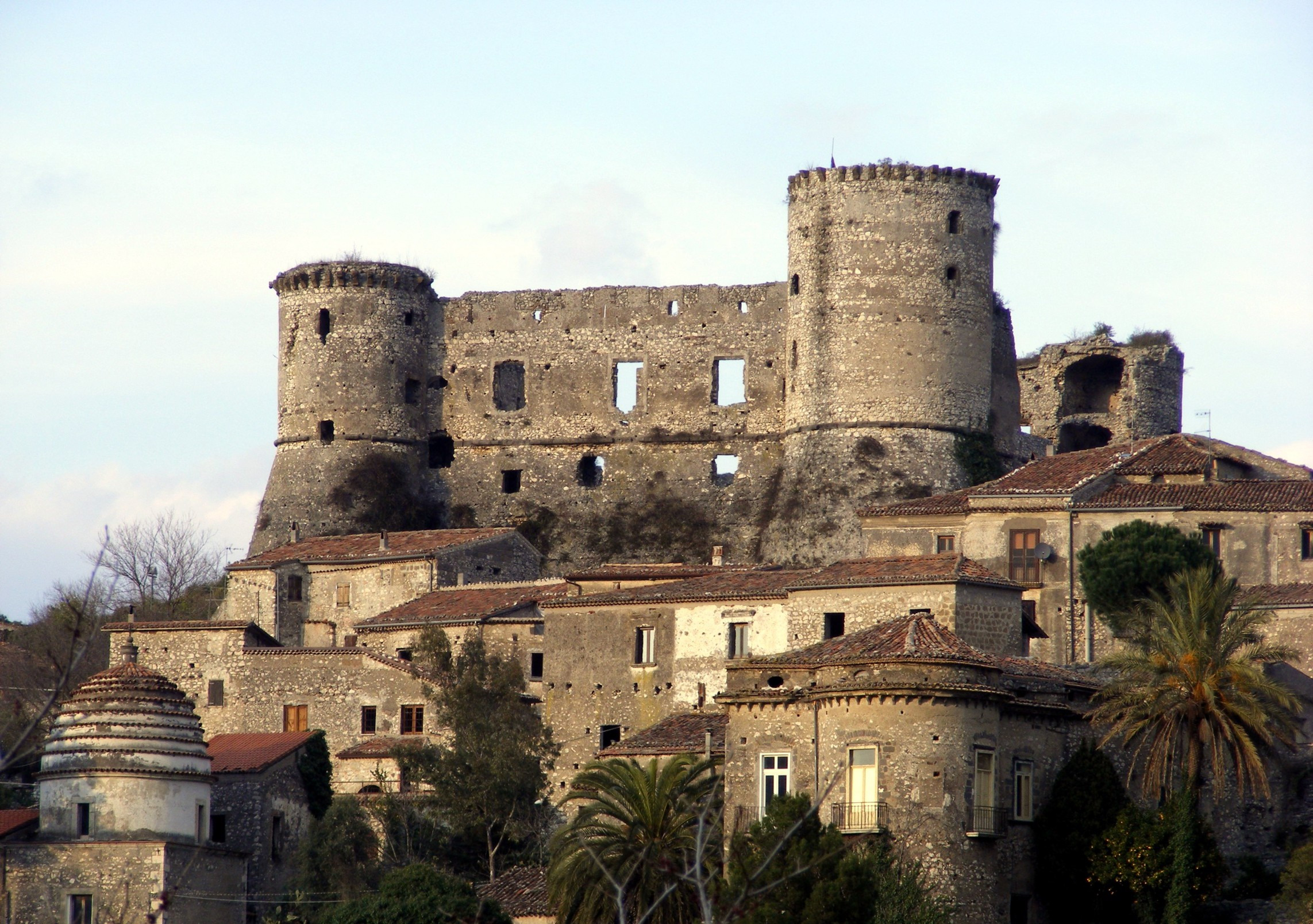
- The castle of Vairano Patenora.

- Location within Italy Location within Campania
- Coordinates: 41°20′N 14°8′E
- Country: Italy
- Region: Campania
- Province: Caserta (CE)
- Frazioni: Marzanello, Vairano Scalo

Government
  - Mayor: Bartolomeo Cantelmo

Area
  - Total: 43.7 km^{2} (16.9 sq mi)
- Elevation: 168 m (551 ft)

Population (31 December 2015)
  - Total: 6,594
  - Density: 151/km^{2} (391/sq mi)
- Demonym: Vairanesi
- Time zone: UTC+1 (CET)
  - Summer (DST): UTC+2 (CEST)
- Postal code: 81058
- Dialing code: 0823

Vairano Patenora is a comune (municipality) in the Province of Caserta in the Italian region Campania, located about 60 kilometres (37 mi) north of Naples and about 35 kilometres (22 mi) northwest of Caserta.

== Geography ==
Variano borders with the municipalities of Ailano, Caianello, Marzano Appio, Pietravairano, Pratella, Presenzano, Raviscanina, Riardo and Teano. Its frazioni are Marzanello and Vairano Scalo, in which is located the railway station.

== History ==
The area of Variano has been inhabited for at least 700,000 years. Remains found on the hills of Vairano certify that primitive men lived in caves or in wooden huts.

One of the first civilizations was the Opici, followed by the Etruscans, the Samnites and the Sidicini. The Samnites built on our hills fortified cities, as we know from the remains visible on Montano, Caievola and Monteforte. In 290 BC the territory became under Roman control, and an old Roman bridge remains today in a place called Frattelle.

Between the 6th and the 9th centuries Lombards invaded Vairano and built a fortress which was used to defend themselves against Saracen and other invasions. In the 11th century, the Normans subdued the Lombards, and in 1191 emperor Herny VI of Hohenstaufen gave the castle to Roffredo dell’Isola, the abbot of Montecassino.

The fortress underwent several transformations and reconstructions during centuries: the most important was made by Innico II d'Avalos Cacciapuoti in the 16th century.

In 1590 Vairano and Marzanello were bought by Baron Mormile who turned the military fortress into a residential seat. Mormile owned Vairano until 1806.

Garibaldi and Victor Emmanuel II met in Vairano at Taverna della Catena to ratify the Unity of Italy.
