= Raviscanina =

- Comune
- Comune di Raviscanina
- Location within Italy Location within Campania
- Coordinates: 41°22′N 14°15′E
- Country: Italy
- Region: Campania
- Province: Caserta (CE)
- Frazioni: Quattro Venti, Case Pagane

Government
  - Mayor: Ermanno Masiello

Area
  - Total: 24.64 km^{2} (9.51 sq mi)
- Elevation: 358 m (1,175 ft)

Population (31 March 2017)
  - Total: 1,314
  - Density: 53.33/km^{2} (138.1/sq mi)
- Demonym: Raviscaninesi
- Time zone: UTC+1 (CET)
  - Summer (DST): UTC+2 (CEST)
- Postal code: 81010
- Dialing code: 0823
- Patron saint: St. Michael Archangel
- Saint day: September 29
- Website: Official website

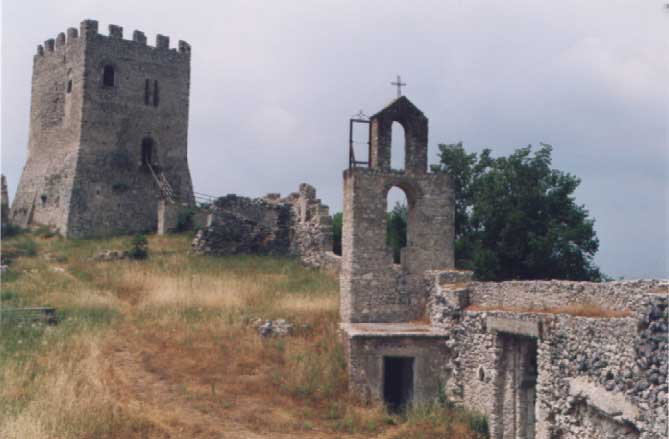
Remains of Raviscanina Castle

Raviscanina is a comune (municipality) in the Province of Caserta in the Italian region Campania, located about 60 kilometres (37 mi) north of Naples and about 35 kilometres (22 mi) north of Caserta.

Raviscanina borders the following municipalities: Ailano, Pietravairano, Prata Sannita, Sant'Angelo d'Alife, Vairano Patenora, Valle Agricola.

== History ==
The city was the fief of Count Richard of Rupecanina.

== Main sights ==
In the nearby are the ruins of the castle of Rupecanina, built by the Normans over a pre-existing Samnite fortress.
