= Venafrum =

Ancient town and archaeological site in Venafro, Italy

- Location within Molise
- 41°29′08″N 14°02′23″E
- Type: Settlement
- Periods: Roman Republic
- Cultures: Ancient Rome
- Location: Comune di Venafro
- Region: Campania

Site notes
- Excavation dates: yes

Venafrum was an ancient town of Molise, Italy, close to the boundaries of both Latium adiectum and Samnium. Its site is occupied by the modern Venafro, a village on the railway from Isernia to Vairano, 25 km southwest of the former, 201 m above sea-level.

== Overview ==
Venafrum was established as a civitas sine suffragio in 201 BC. Ancient authors tell us but little about it, except that it was one of those towns governed by a prefect sent yearly from Rome, and that in the Social War it was taken by the allies by treachery. Augustus founded a colony there and provided for the construction of an aqueduct (cf. the long decree relating to it in Corp. Inscr. Lat. x. No. 4842).

It seems to have been a place of some importance. Its olive oil was the best in Italy, and Cato mentions its brickworks and iron manufactures. The original line of the Via Latina probably ran through Venafrum, making a detour, which the later road seems to have avoided. Rufrae was probably dependent on it. Roads also ran from Venafrum to Isernia and to Telesia by way of Allifae.

== Bibliography ==
- Diebner, Sylvia (1979). Aesernia – Venafrum. Untersuchungen zu den römischen Steindenkmälern zweier Landstädte Mittelitaliens [Aesernia - Venafrum. Studies on the Roman stone monuments of two rural towns in central Italy]. Rome: Bretschneider, ISBN 88-85007-27-9.
- Patrizio Pensabene, Valerio Bruni (2024). Il teatro e l'odeion di Venafro [The theatre and the odeum of Venafrum]. Bibliotheca archaeologica, vol. 78. Rome: L'Erma di Bretschneider.
