= Valle Agricola =

Comune in Campania, Italy

- Comune
- Comune di Valle Agricola
- Location within Italy Location within Campania
- Coordinates: 41°25′N 14°15′E
- Country: Italy
- Region: Campania
- Province: Caserta (CE)

Government
  - Mayor: Rocco Landi

Area
  - Total: 24.42 km^{2} (9.43 sq mi)
- Elevation: 691 m (2,267 ft)

Population (31 March 2017)
  - Total: 863
  - Density: 35.3/km^{2} (91.5/sq mi)
- Demonym: Valligiani
- Time zone: UTC+1 (CET)
  - Summer (DST): UTC+2 (CEST)
- Postal code: 81010
- Dialing code: 0823
- Website: Official website

Valle Agricola is a comune (municipality) in the Province of Caserta in the Italian region Campania, located about 60 kilometres (37 mi) north of Naples and about 40 kilometres (25 mi) north of Caserta.

Valle Agricola borders the following municipalities: Letino, Prata Sannita, Raviscanina, San Gregorio Matese, Sant'Angelo d'Alife.
