= Gallo Matese =

- Comune
- Comune di Gallo Matese
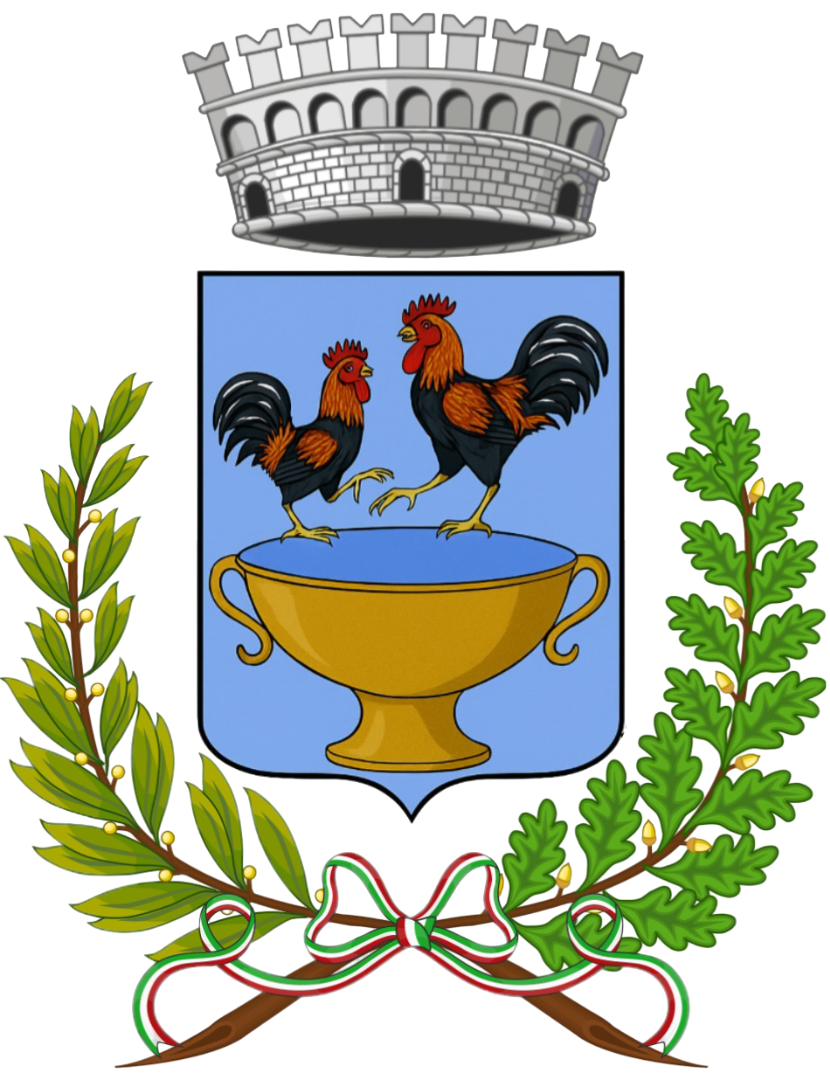
- Coat of arms

- Location within Italy Location within Campania
- Coordinates: 41°28′N 14°13′E
- Country: Italy
- Region: Campania
- Province: Caserta (CE)
- Frazioni: Vallelunga

Government
  - Mayor: Giovanni Antonio Palumbo

Area
  - Total: 30.9 km^{2} (11.9 sq mi)
- Elevation: 875 m (2,871 ft)

Population (31 December 2010)
  - Total: 678
  - Density: 21.9/km^{2} (56.8/sq mi)
- Demonym: Gallesi
- Time zone: UTC+1 (CET)
  - Summer (DST): UTC+2 (CEST)
- Postal code: 81010
- Dialing code: 0823
- Patron saint: St. Anthony
- Saint day: June 13
- Website: Official website

Gallo Matese (Molisano: Ru Uàllë) is a comune (municipality) in the Province of Caserta in the Italian region Campania, located in a valley near the Matese Apennines chain and the boundary with Molise, about 70 kilometres (43 mi) north of Naples and about 45 kilometres (28 mi) north of Caserta. Its territory is also home of an artificial lake with the same name. The territory is mostly mountainous.

The town was one of the few settled by a small Bulgar horde in the 7th century.
