= Sant'Angelo d'Alife =

- Comune
- Comune di Sant'Angelo d'Alife
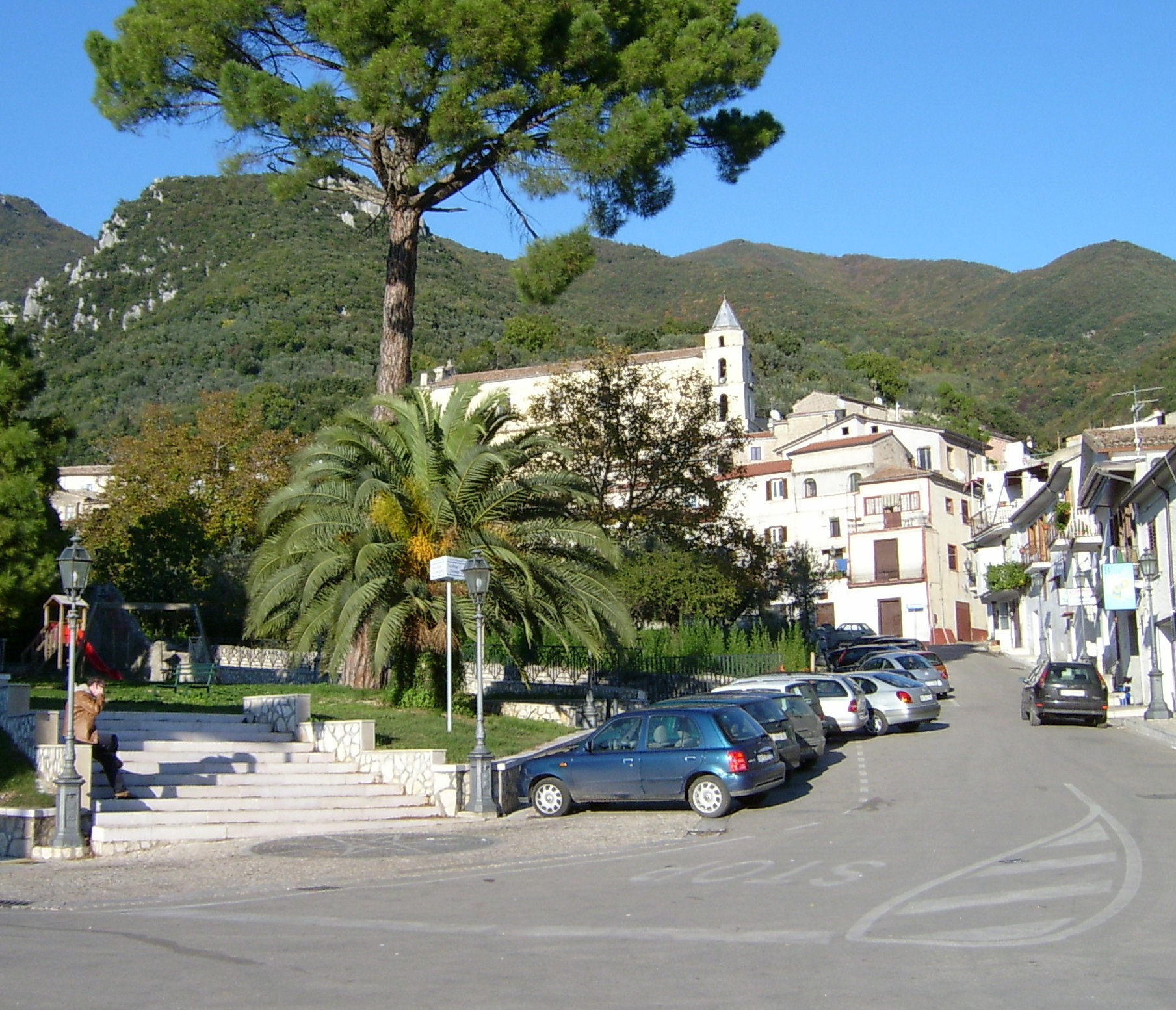

- Coat of arms

- Location within Italy Location within Campania
- Coordinates: 41°22′N 14°16′E
- Country: Italy
- Region: Campania
- Province: Caserta (CE)

Government
  - Mayor: Michele Caporaso

Area
  - Total: 33.52 km^{2} (12.94 sq mi)
- Elevation: 385 m (1,263 ft)

Population (31 March 2017)
  - Total: 2,247
  - Density: 67.03/km^{2} (173.6/sq mi)
- Demonym: Santangiolesi
- Time zone: UTC+1 (CET)
  - Summer (DST): UTC+2 (CEST)
- Postal code: 81017
- Dialing code: 0823
- Website: Official website

Sant'Angelo d'Alife is a comune (municipality) in the Province of Caserta in the Italian region Campania, located about 60 kilometres (37 mi) north of Naples and about 35 kilometres (22 mi) north of Caserta.

Sant'Angelo d'Alife borders the following municipalities: Alife, Baia e Latina, Piedimonte Matese, Pietravairano, Raviscanina, San Gregorio Matese, Valle Agricola.

Sant'Angelo d'Alife is the hometown of US singer Dion DiMucci grandfather Benedetto.

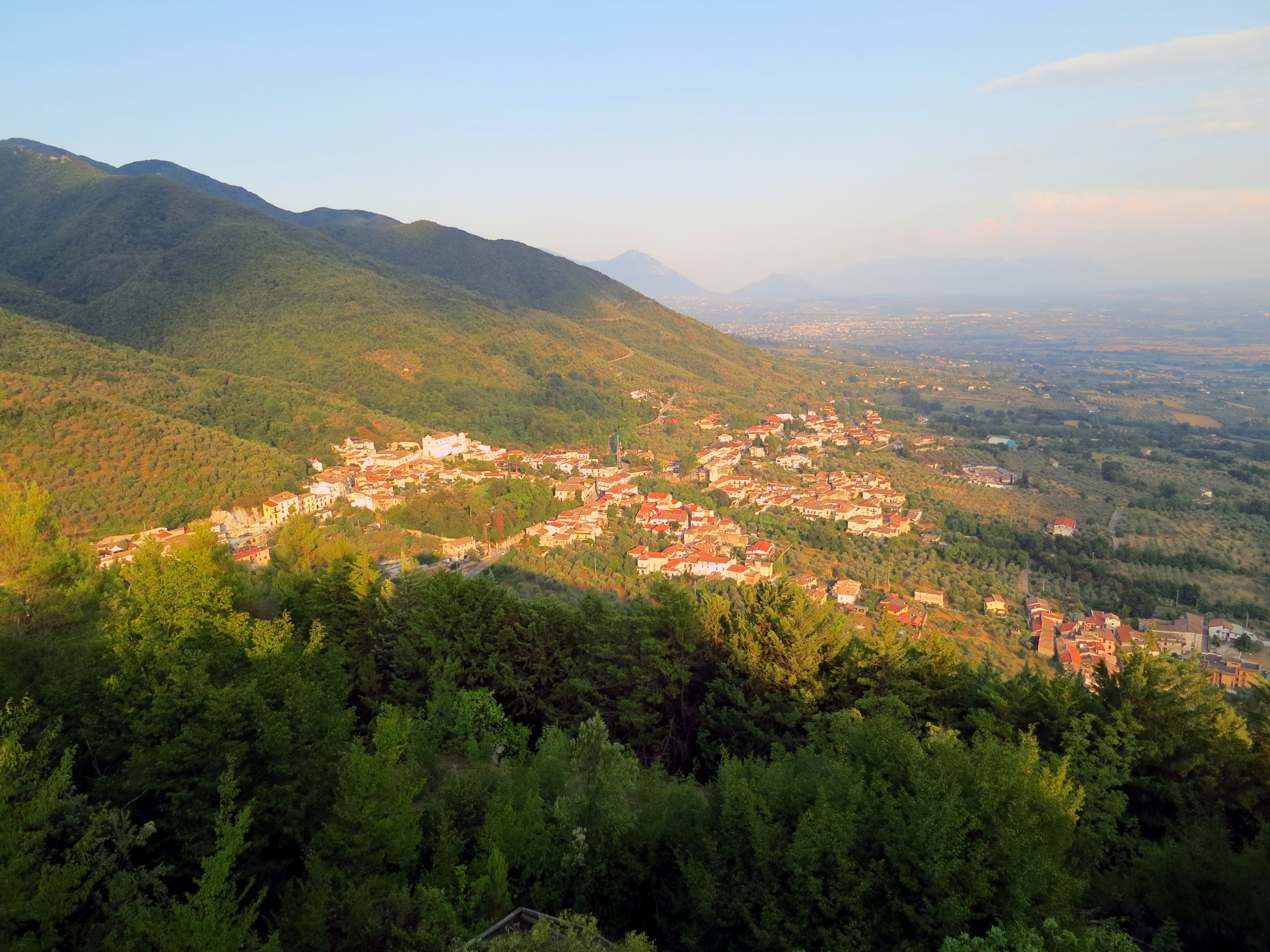
