= Fioravanti =

Fioravanti may refer to:

- Fioravanti (surname), a family name and persons with it
- Fioravanti (automotive), a design studio
- Fioravanti (soft drink), a soft drink
- Fioravanti, a noble family originating in Pistoia, Tuscany, Italy
