= Palazzo del Priorino, Pistoia =

The Palazzo del Priorino is a Baroque-style palace on Via Pacini in central Pistoia, Tuscany, Italy.

== Description ==
At the end of the 16th century, Lorenzo di Girolamo, a member of the prominent Sozzifanti family, began construction of a palace at this site. He was the prior of the Order of Santo Stefano and thus the palace gained the title of the Palazzo del Priorino. The design is attributed to Jacopo Lafri, although Tigri hypothesizes Bernini. In 1743, the palace was sold to the Banchieri family, who owned it till 1833. In 1833 it was bought by Stefano Corsini, who granted in 1892 to the Mantellate nuns. The stone brick frames and corners recall the contemporaneously built Palazzo Ganucci Cancellieri. As is evident from the facade, the palace remains unfinished.
