= Cancellieri =

Cancelieri is a surname of Italian origin. Notable people with this surname include:

- Annamaria Cancellieri (born 1943), former Italian minister of Interior and the former justice minister
- Francesco Cancellieri (1751–1826), Italian writer, librarian, and erudite bibliophile
- Innocenzo Del Bufalo-Cancellieri (1566–1610), Roman Catholic cardinal
- Monika Cancellieri (born 1976), Hungarian pornographic actress and fetish model
- Pietro Cancellieri, also known as Pietro Cavalieri (died 1580), Roman Catholic Bishop of Lipari
- Rainaldo Cancellieri, Roman Catholic Bishop of Sant'Angelo dei Lombardi
- Valerio Cancellieri (died 1574), Italian Roman Catholic Bishop of Sant'Angelo dei Lombardi e Bisaccia

== See also ==
- Cancello (disambiguation)
- Palazzo Ganucci Cancellieri, a late-Mannerist-style palace located in central Pistoia, Tuscany, Italy
