= Fioravanti (surname) =

Fioravanti is an Italian surname. Notable people with the surname include:

- Aristotile Fioravanti (c.1415 or 1420 – c.1486), Italian architect and engineer
- Danilo Fioravanti (1913–1997), Italian gymnast
- Domenico Fioravanti (born 1977), Italian Olympic swimmer
- Giulio Fioravanti (1922–1999), Italian operatic baritone
- Giuseppe Fioravanti (1790s – c.1850), Italian operatic bass, son of Valentino Fioravanti
- José Fioravanti (1896–1977), Argentine sculptor
- Leonardo Fioravanti (doctor) (1518–1588), Italian doctor
- Leonardo Fioravanti (engineer) (born 1938), Italian car designer
- Luigi Fioravanti (born 1981), Italian-American professional mixed martial artist
- Marcos Christino Fioravanti (1775–1862), Italian surgeon
- Valentino Fioravanti (1764–1837), Italian opera composer, father of Giuseppe Fioravanti
- Valerio Fioravanti (born 1958), Italian terrorist
- Vincenzo Fioravanti (1799–1877), Italian opera composer

Fioravanti Family. A noble family from Pistoia and Florence.
