= Bauch =

Bauch is the German word for belly. It is used as a surname, notable people with the name include:

- Bruno Bauch (1877–1942), German Neo-Kantian philosopher
- Christa Bauch (b. 1947), Professional female bodybuilder from Germany
- Emil Bauch (1823-after 1874), German painter, lithographer and teacher who made his reputation in Brazil
- Herbert Bauch (b. 1957), Boxer who represented East Germany at the 1980 Summer Olympics
- Jan Bauch (1898–1995), Czech artist especially noted as a painter and sculptor
- Kurt Bauch (1897–1975), German art historian
