= Firmino Monteiro =

Brazilian painter (1855–1888)

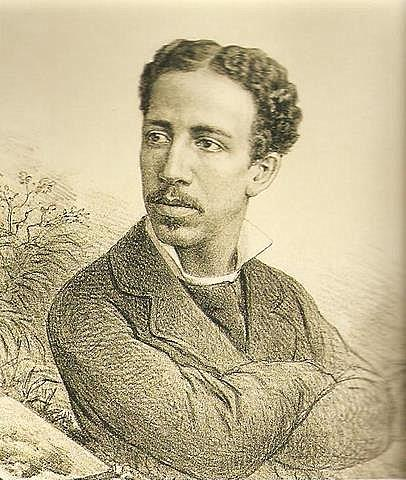
- Lithograph by Angelo Agostini, 1882
- Born: 22 February 1855; Rio de Janeiro, Brazil
- Died: 3 July 1888 (aged 33); Niterói, Brazil
- Education: Imperial Academy of Fine Arts

Antônio Firmino Monteiro (22 February 1855 – 3 July 1888) was a Brazilian painter.

== Biography ==
He was born into poverty in Rio de Janeiro, and in his youth had to work as a clerk, printer and bookbinder to help support his family. As a result, he had to postpone his artistic studies at the Academia Imperial de Belas Artes until he was older than the average new student. He eventually was able to study with Victor Meirelles, Agostinho José da Mota and João Zeferino da Costa.

Most of his work consisted of landscapes and genre scenes done in and around Rio de Janeiro. One of his first trips elsewhere occurred in 1880, when he was able to go to Europe with the financial assistance of Emperor Pedro II. When he returned, he applied for the chair of "Landscape, Flower and Animal Painting" at the academy, but the position went to someone else.

He participated in the "Exposição Gerais de Belas Artes" several times. In 1879, he received the Second Gold Medal. In 1884, he was named a Knight of the Imperial Ordem da Rosa for "Camões no seu leito de morte" (Camões on his deathbed) and works depicting the street life of the capital.

From 1885 to 1887, he made further study trips to Europe, with a longer stay in Paris. When he returned, he became a teacher at the Escola de Belas Artes da Bahia. He was also interested in the chemistry of pigments. His death, in 1888 in Niterói, is described as "sudden".

== Gallery ==
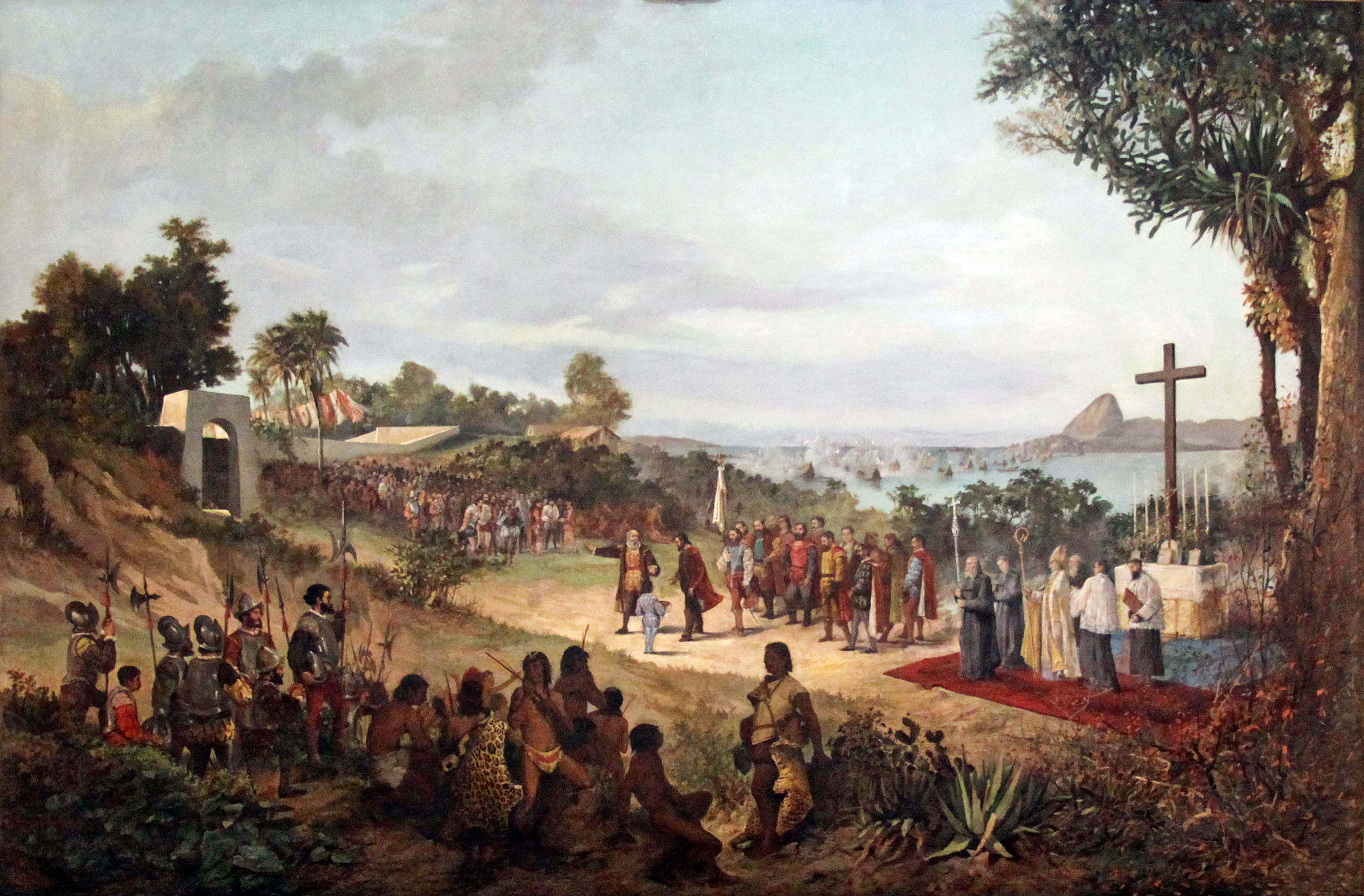
Founding of the City of Rio de Janeiro (1881)

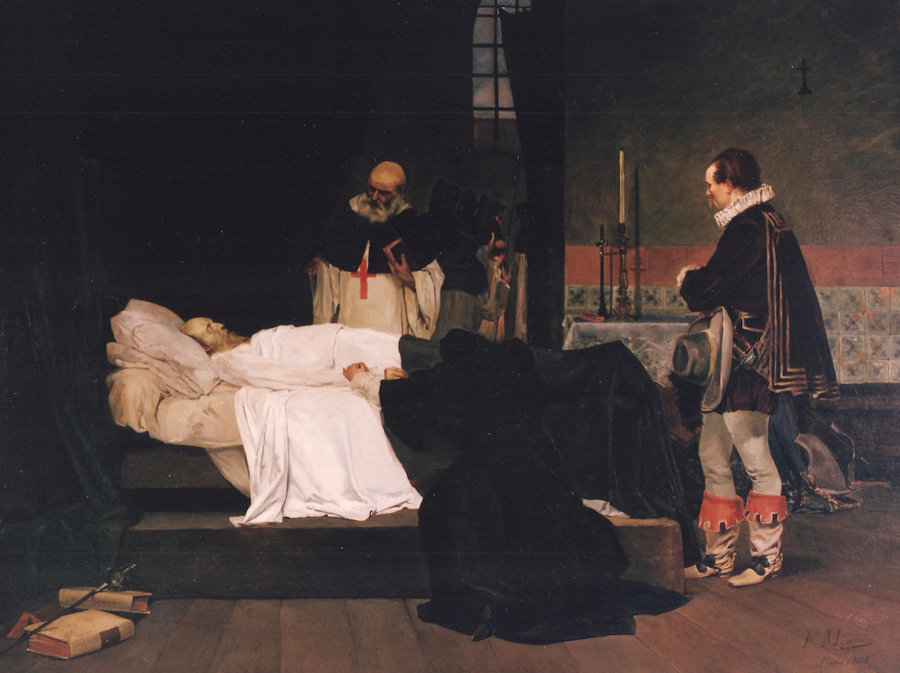
Camões on his deathbed (1883)

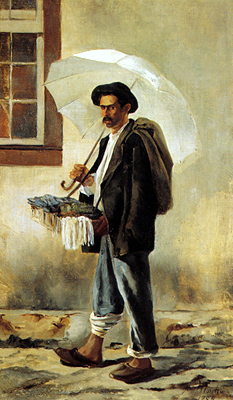
Matches! (1884)

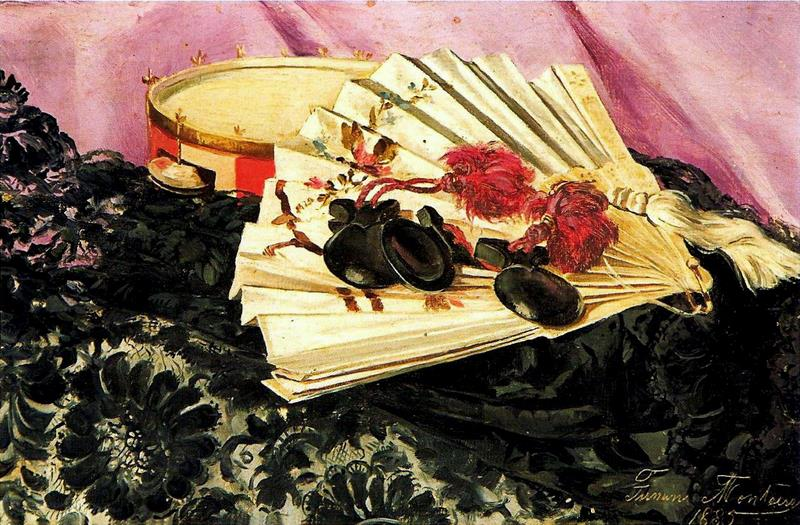
Still life (1885)

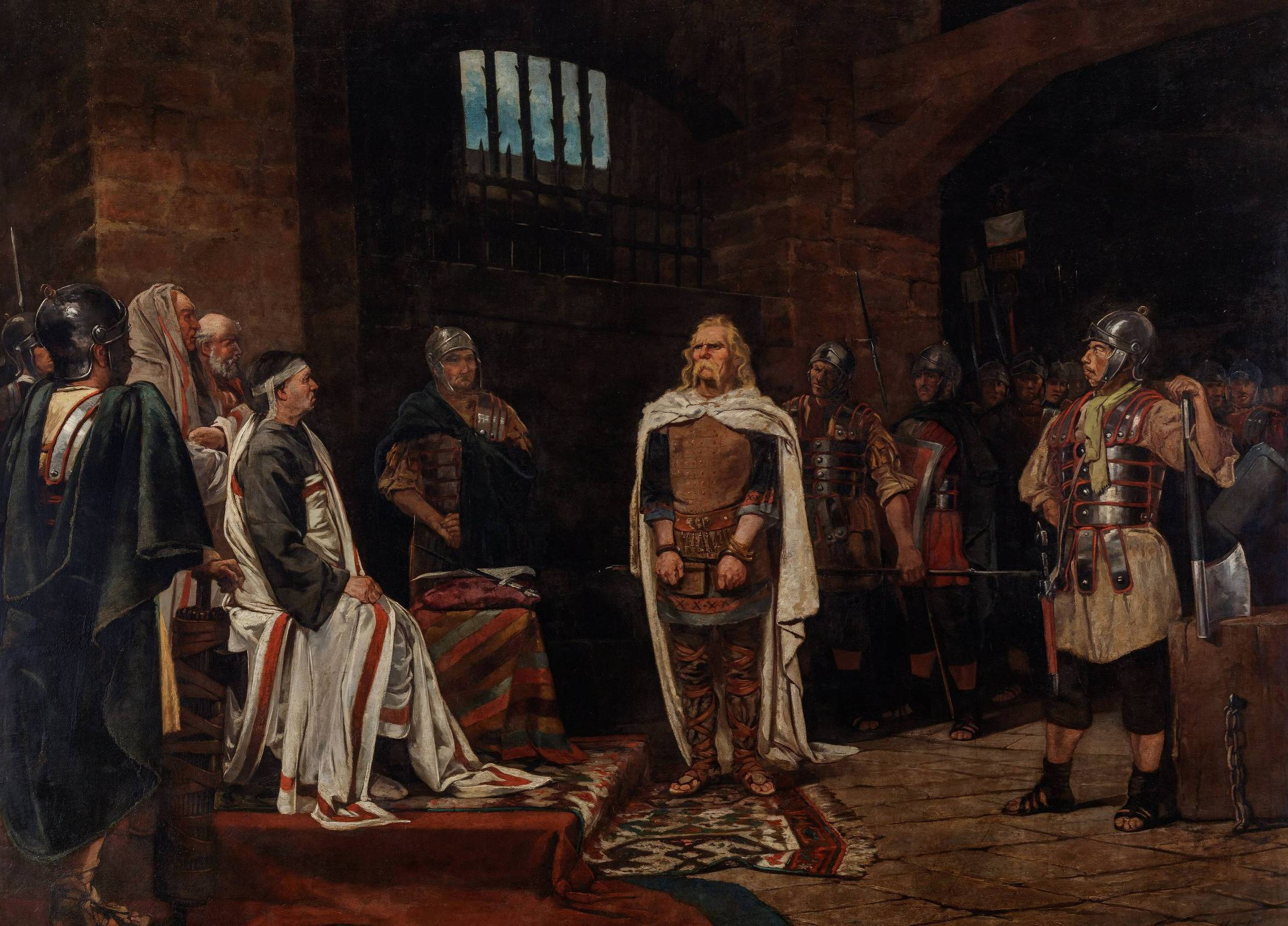
Vercingetorix before Julius Caesar (1886)
