= Antônio Ricardo dos Santos =

Brazilian politician and industrialist

Personal details
- Born: 22 September 1819 Morretes, Brazil
- Died: 17 November 1888 (aged 69) Curitiba, Brazil

Antônio Ricardo dos Santos Filho (22 September 1819 – 17 November 1888) was a Brazilian politician and industrialist. He was the first vice-president of the Paraná Province, between 29 December 1887, and 9 February 1888.

Antonio Ricardo dos Santos Filho was born in Morretes, Paraná, on 22 September 1819, the son of sergeant major Antonio Ricardo dos Santos and his second wife Maria da Luz Paraizo. He married Córdula Martins dos Santos on 9 September 1844.

From the time he was very young, he devoted himself to commercial activities together with his father, soon becoming a businessman and industrialist of sugarcane and yerba mate in Morretes. In 1878, he moved to Curitiba, where he inaugurated the Iguaçu yerba-mate mill on the edge of the river Barigui, in the Batel neighborhood. At the same time he already owned another mill in São João da Graciosa, which made him one of the greatest yerba-mate industrialists of his time. He exported his product with his brand name, A.R. Santos.

In the political field, he took up the posts of councilman, judge, and justice of the peace in Morretes in the years 1857–1860, 1861–1864, 1866–1868 and 1869–1872. He was a representative in the Provincial Legislative Assembly between 1858 and 1859, 1870 and 1871, 1875 and 1876, 1878 and 1879. He lent 25 contos de réis to the public coffers of the Province of Paraná in 1876.

Commander Dodoca, as he became known, was the cousin of the Nacar Viscount and acted as the host for Princess Izabel and Count d'Eu in 1887. He was a member of the Conservative Party. In 1871, Dom Pedro II gave him the title of Commander of the Order of the Rose. He was also a Knight in the Order of Christ.

He was the father of politician José Pereira dos Santos Andrade. He died in Curitiba, on 17 November 1888, when he was 69 years old.
