= Cancello =

The Italian word Cancello (meaning gate), plural Cancelli, may refer to:

== Places of Italy ==
- Cancelli, hamlet of Foligno, in the Province of Perugia
- Cancello, hamlet of San Felice a Cancello, in the Province of Caserta
- Cancello e Arnone, municipality of the Province of Caserta
- San Felice a Cancello, municipality of the Province of Caserta

== Architecture ==
- Cancelli (or cancellarii), lattice-works placed before a window
