= Order of the Rose =

Brazilian order of chivalry award

Imperial Order of the Rose
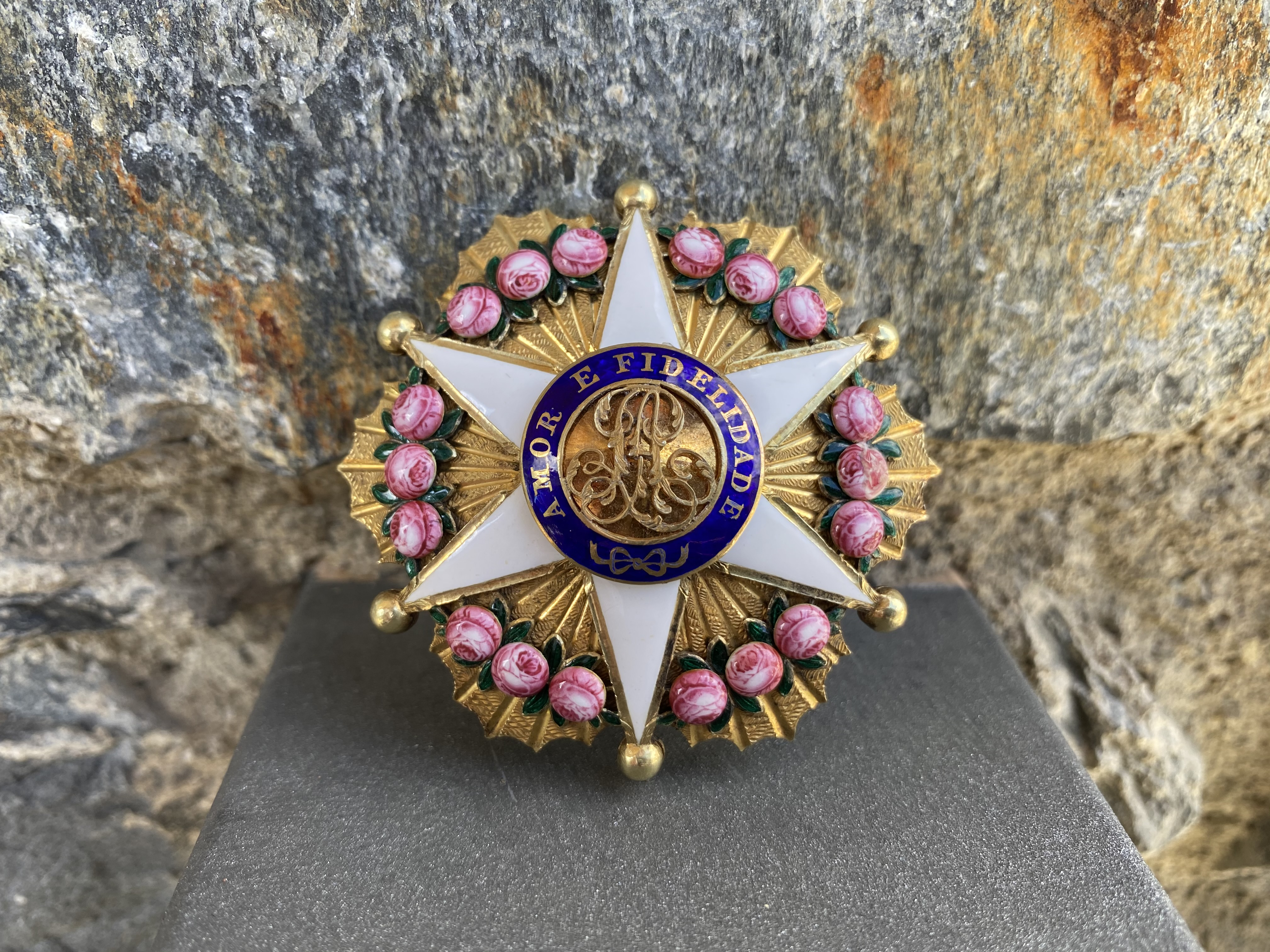
- Imperial Order of the Rose, Officer

Awarded by the Head of the Brazilian Imperial Family
- Type: Dynastic order
- Established: 17 October 1829; 1829–1890 (National Order); 1890–present (House Order)
- Royal house: Orleans-Braganza
- Motto: AMOR E FIDELIDADE (Love and Fidelity)
- Grand Master: Disputed: Prince Bertrand of Orléans-Braganza; Prince Pedro Carlos of Orléans-Braganza
- Grades: Grand Cross; Grand Dignitary; Dignitary; Commander; Officer; Knight

Precedence
- Next (higher): Imperial Order of Pedro I
- Next (lower): none (lowest Order)
- Ribbon bar of the order

The Imperial Order of the Rose (Portuguese: Imperial Ordem da Rosa) was a Brazilian order of chivalry, instituted by Emperor Pedro I of Brazil on 17 October 1829 to commemorate his marriage to Amélie of Leuchtenberg.

On 22 March 1890, the order was cancelled as national order by the interim government of First Brazilian Republic. Since the deposition in 1889 of the last Brazilian monarch, Emperor Pedro II, the order continues as a house order being awarded by the Heads of the House of Orleans-Braganza, pretenders to the defunct throne of Brazil. The current Brazilian Imperial Family is split into two branches: the direct line called Petrópolis and a cadet branch called Vassouras.

== History ==
It was designed by Jean-Baptiste Debret, who, as discussed by historians, would have been inspired by the motifs of roses that adorned Amélie's dress when landing in Rio de Janeiro, or when marrying, or in a portrait of the same envoy from Europe to the then Emperor of Brazil.

The order rewarded military and civilians, national and foreign, who distinguished themselves by their fidelity to the person of the Emperor and by services rendered to the State, and carried a number of degrees superior to the other Brazilian and Portuguese orders then existing.

From 1829 to 1831 Emperor Pedro I granted only 189 insignia. His son and successor, Emperor Pedro II, during the second reign, got to grace 14,284 citizens. In addition to the two emperors, only the Duke of Caxias was order-great during his term.

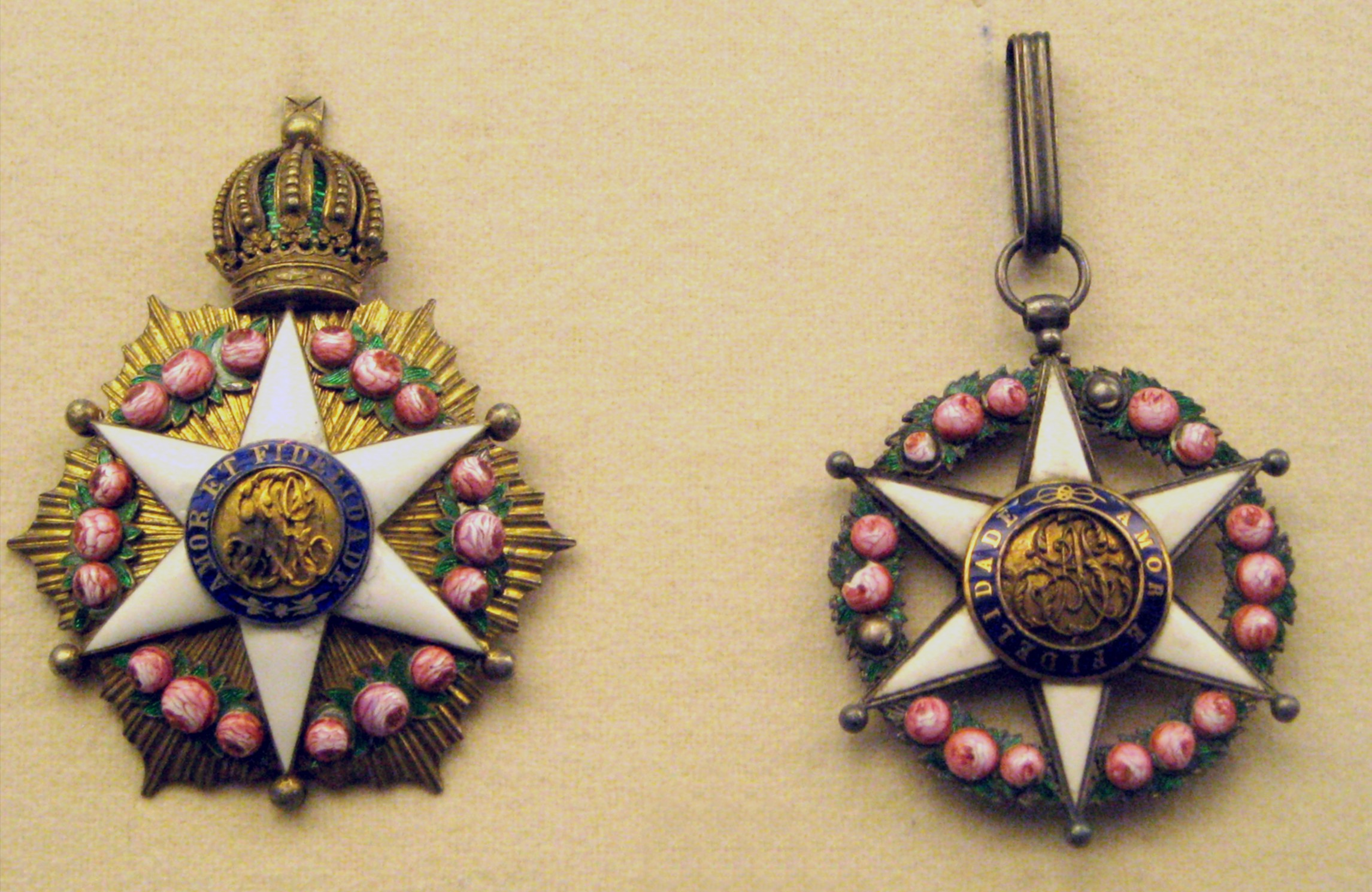
Imperial Order of the Rose

One of the first winners received the commendation for services rendered during an accident with the Brazilian imperial family: the small history of the court tells us that on 7 December 1829, newly married, Pedro I returned with the family of the Imperial Palace of São Cristóvão, in Quinta da Boa Vista. Like his favorite, he personally drove the carriage when, on Lavradio Street, the tow line was broken, and the horses became frightened, breaking the reins and driving the vehicle, dragged dangerously. The Emperor fractured the seventh rib of the posterior third and the sixth of the anterior third, had bruises on the forehead and dislocation in the fourth right, losing his senses. He had barely recovered them when he was picked up at the nearest house by the Marquis de Cantagalo, Joao Maria da Gama Freitas Berquó. According to the Bulletin on the Disaster of Her Imperial Majesty published in the Jornal do Commercio, Empress Amélie was the one who demanded the least care: "she did not have any sensible damage except the shock and the fright that such disaster should cause her." The Emperor's eldest daughter, the future Queen Maria II of Portugal, "received great bruising on the right cheek, comprising part of the head on the same side." Auguste de Beauharnais, Prince of Eichstätt, Duke of Leuchtenberg and of Santa Cruz, brother of the empress, "had a luxation in the ulna of the right side with fracture of the same one". Baroness Slorefeder, assistant of the Empress, "gave a very dangerous fall on the head." Several servants of livery, when dominating the animals, were bruised. The doctors of the Imperial Chamber and others, the doctors Azeredo, Bontempo, the Baron of Inhomirim, Vicente Navarro de Andrade, João Fernandes Tavares, Manuel Bernardes, Manuel da Silveira Rodrigues de Sá, Baron of Saúde converged for the house of Cantagalo. Almost restored, Pedro I decorated Cantagalo on 1 January 1830 with the insignia of the dignitary of the Order, and Empress Amélie offered him her portrait, surrounded by bright jewels, and painted by Simplício Rodrigues de Sá.

The members of the Honor Guard who accompanied the then Prince Regent on his trip to the Province of São Paulo 8 years before, witnesses of the "Grito do Ipiranga" (Cry of Ipiranga), landmark of the Independence of Brazil, were also awarded the Imperial Order of the Rose.

After the banishment of the Brazilian Imperial Family, the order was maintained by its members in private, being its grand master the head of the Brazilian Imperial House.

== Characteristics ==
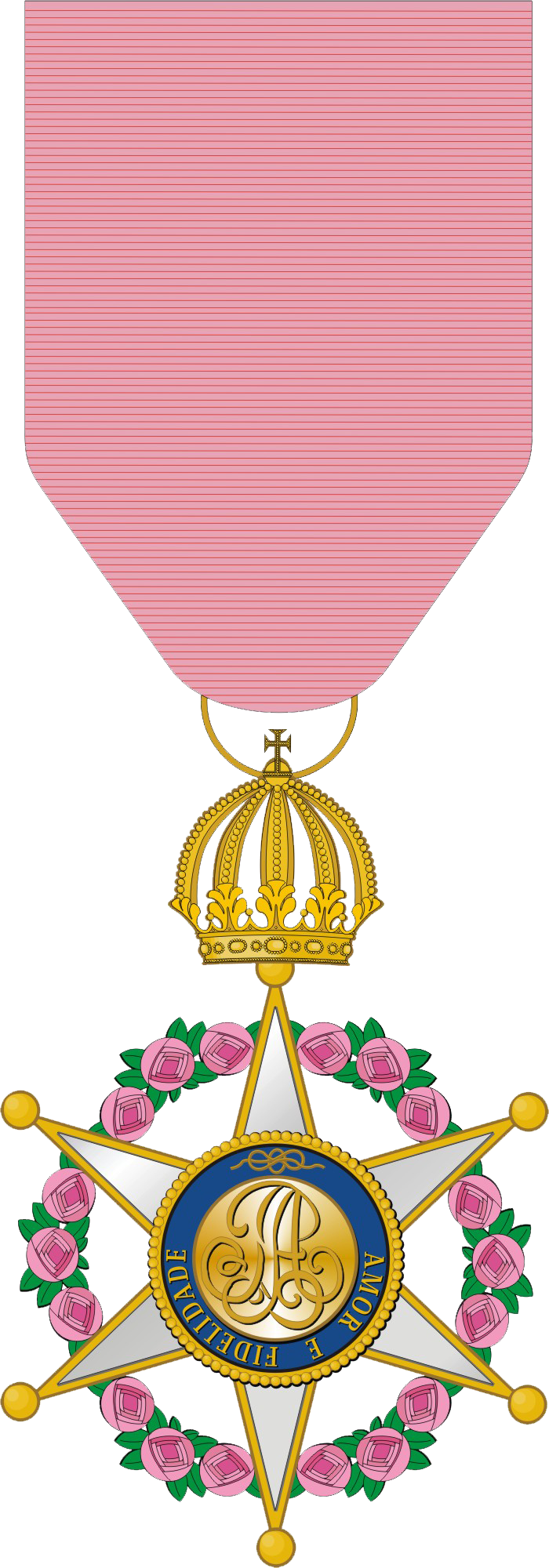
Officer's degree of the Order of the Rose.

=== Insignia ===
Grand cross

- Obverse: White star with six pointed tips, joined by garland of roses. To the center, a round medallion with the letters "P" and "A" interlaced, embossed, surrounded by blue-ferret border with the caption "AMOR E FIDELIDADE" ("LOVE AND FIDELITY").
- Reverse: equal to the obverse, with change in inscription for the date of 2-8-1829, and, in the legend, for "PEDRO AND AMÉLIA".

Tape and band

- Light pink with two white edges.

=== Degrees ===
The degrees in descending order are:

- Grand Cross (styled "Excellency" and limited to 16 recipients);
- Grand Dignitary (styled "Senhor" and limited to 16 recipients);
- Dignitary (styled "Senhor" and limited to 32 recipients);
- Commander (styled "Senhor" and unlimited number of recipients);
- Official (styled an honorary Colonel and unlimited number of recipients);
- Knight (styled an honorary Captain and unlimited number of recipients);

== Gallery ==
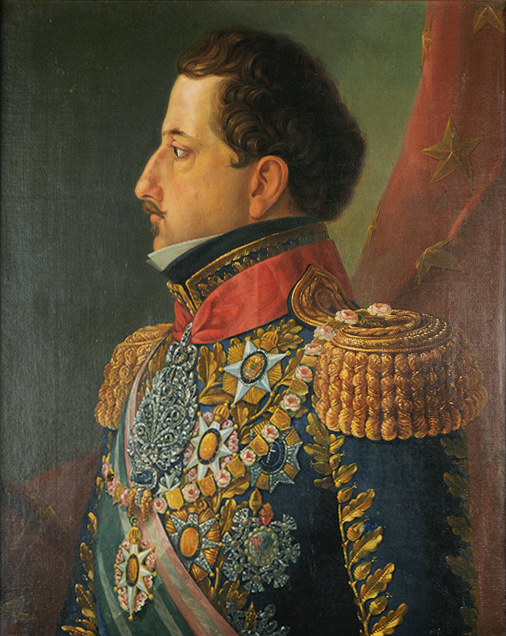
Emperor Pedro I, the founder and first Grand Master of the Order, wearing the collar and the insignia of the Imperial Order of the Rose and other orders and decorations

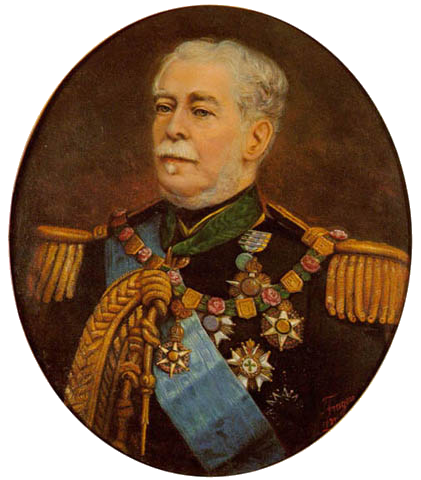
The Duke of Caxias wearing the collar and insignia of the Order and other orders and decorations

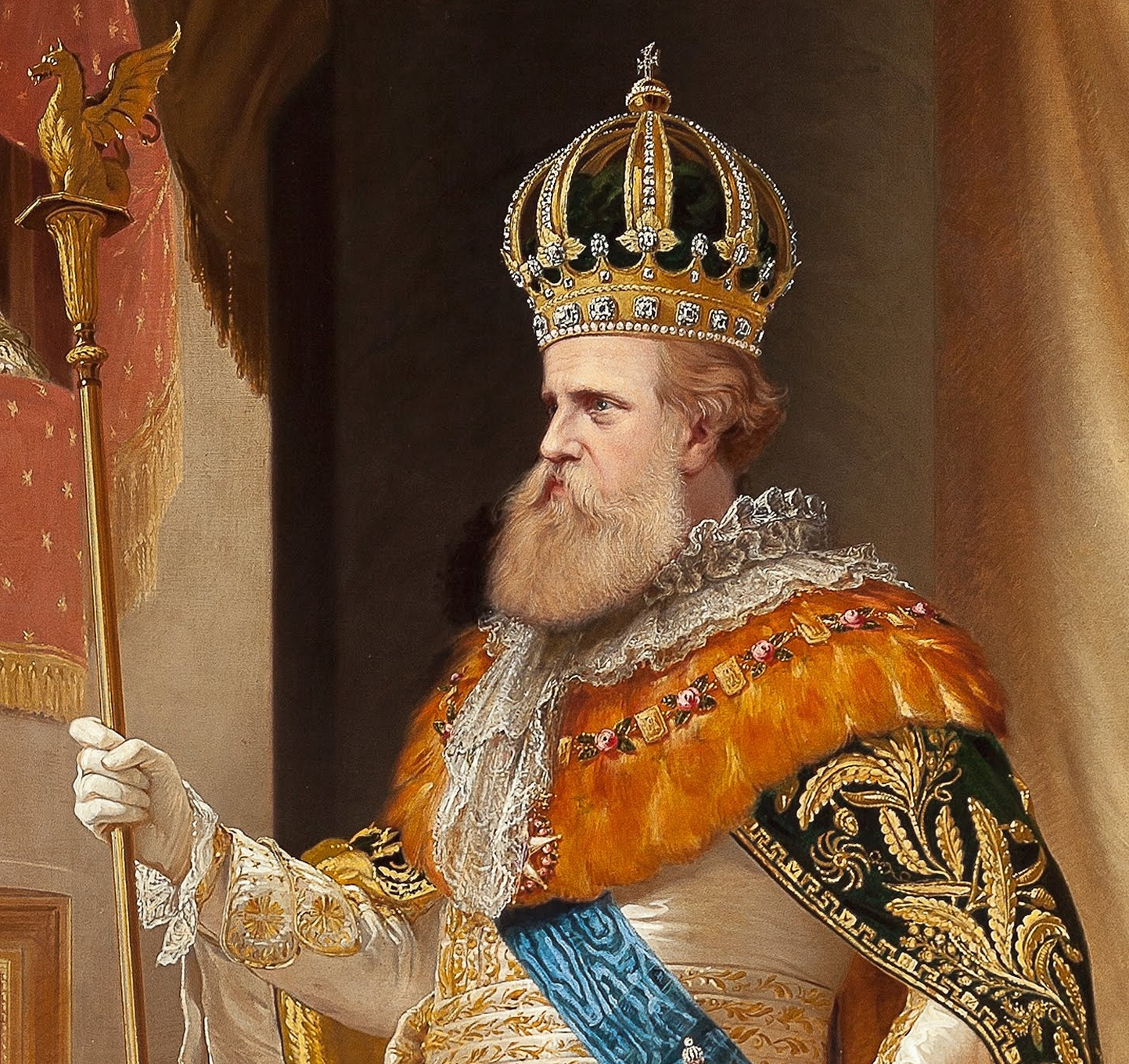
Emperor Pedro II wearing the collar of the Order and items of the Imperial Regalia. Detail from a portrait by Pedro Américo

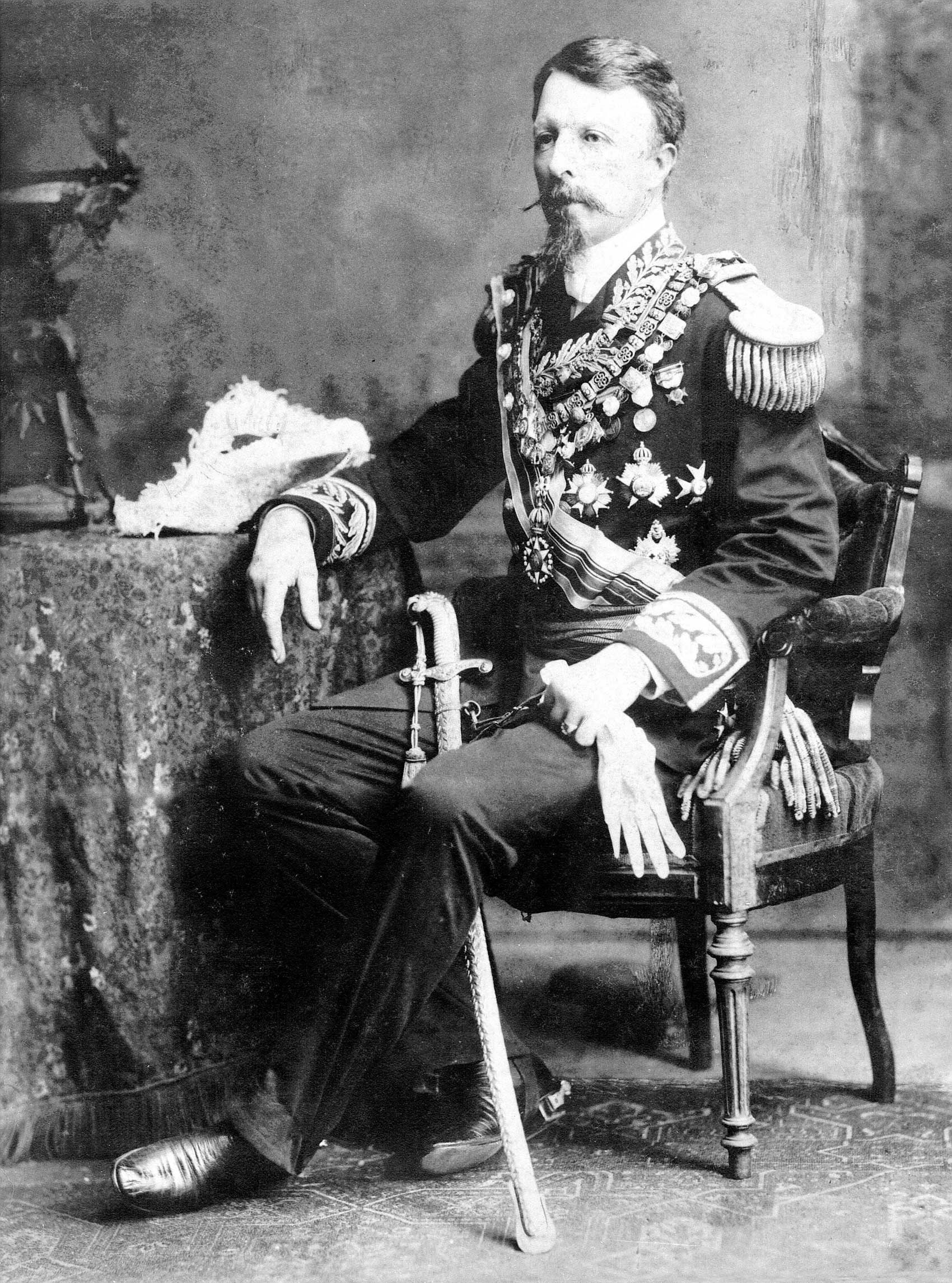
The Count of Eu wearing the collar of the Order and other orders and decorations

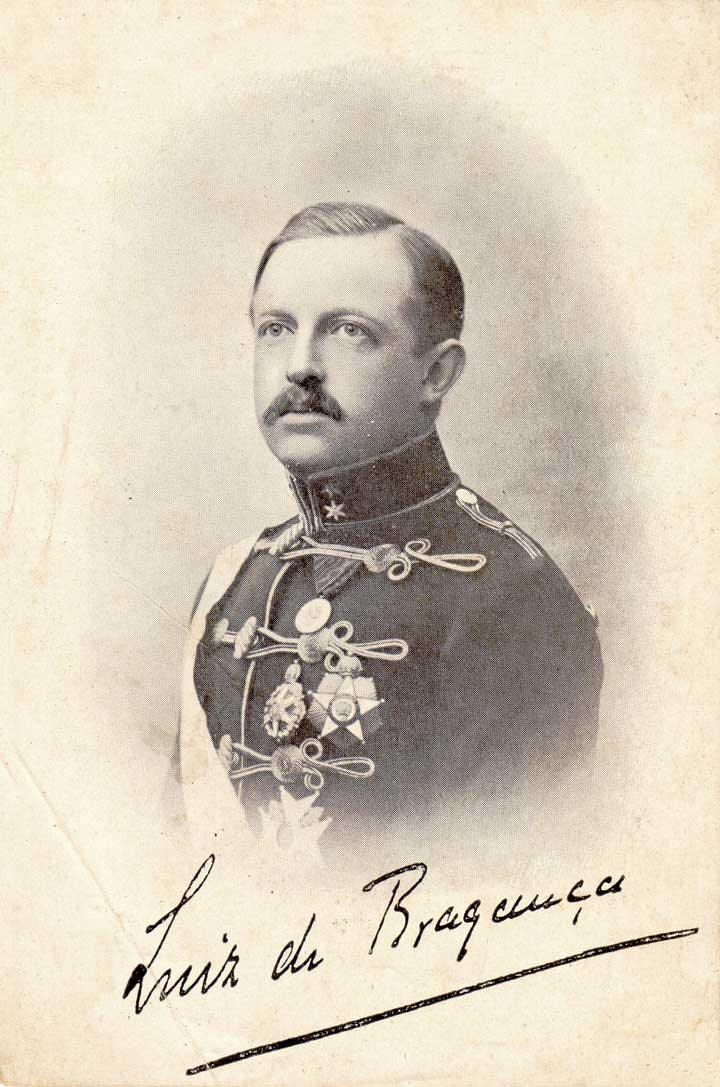
Prince Luís of Orléans-Braganza wearing the insignia of the Order and other orders and decorations

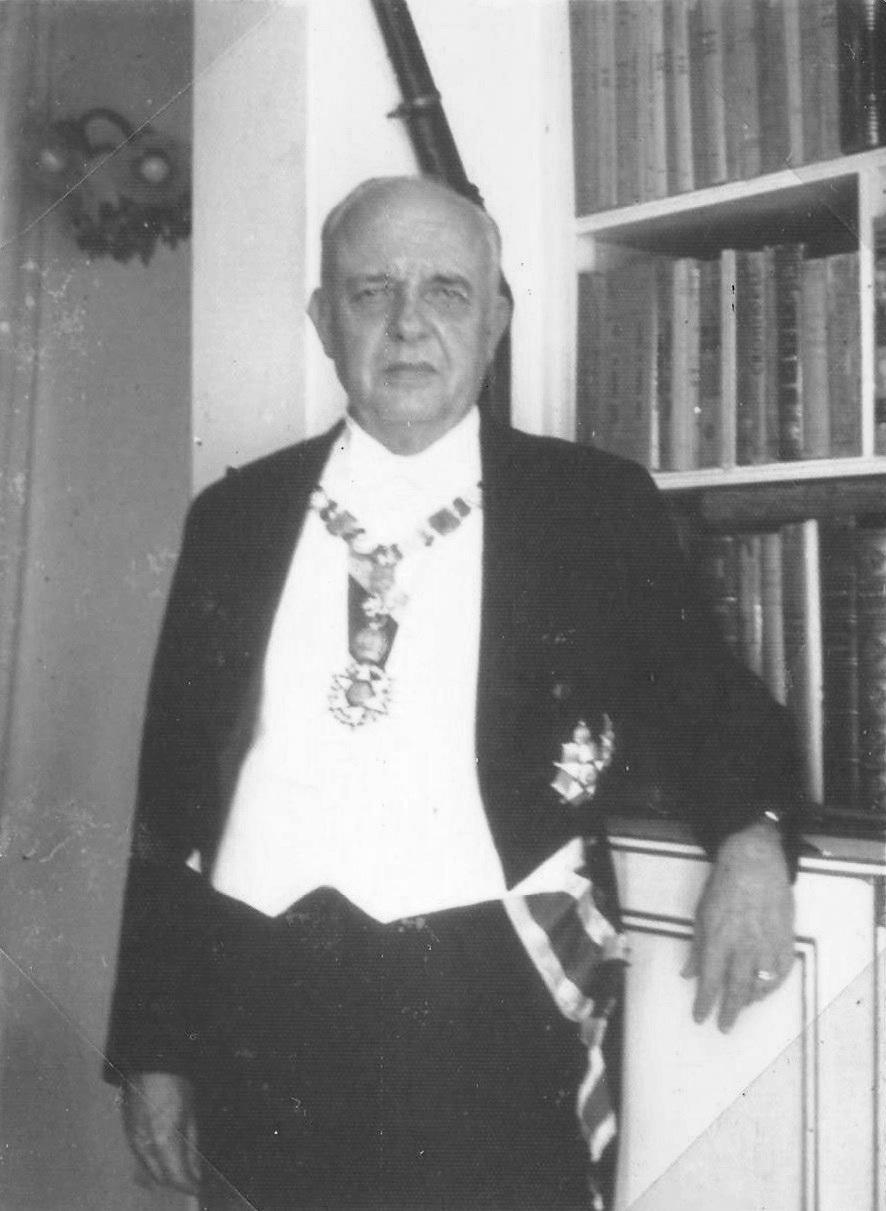
Prince Pedro Henrique of Orléans-Braganza, then Head of the Imperial House of Brazil wearing the collar of the Order and other orders and decorations

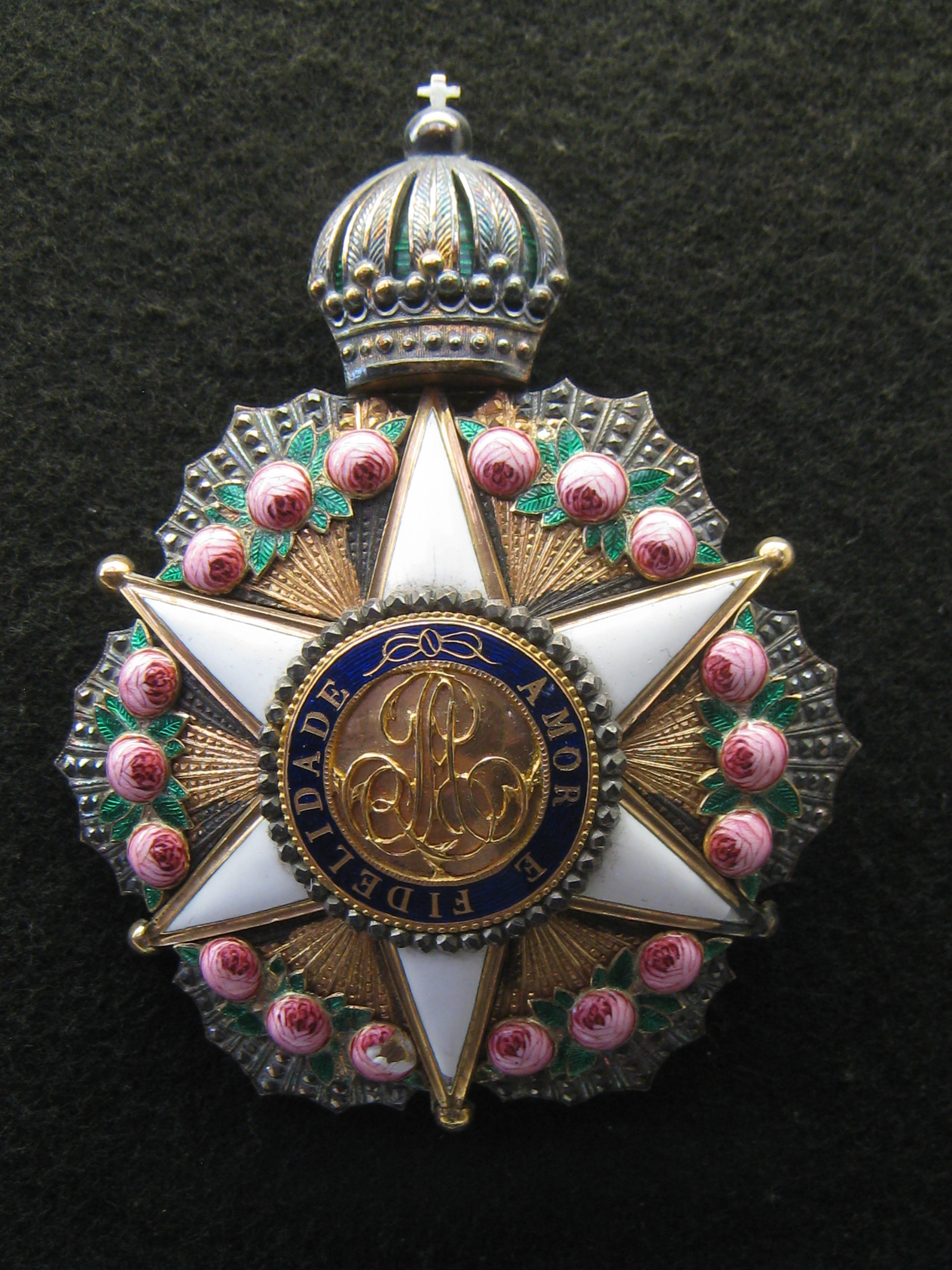
Details of the insignia

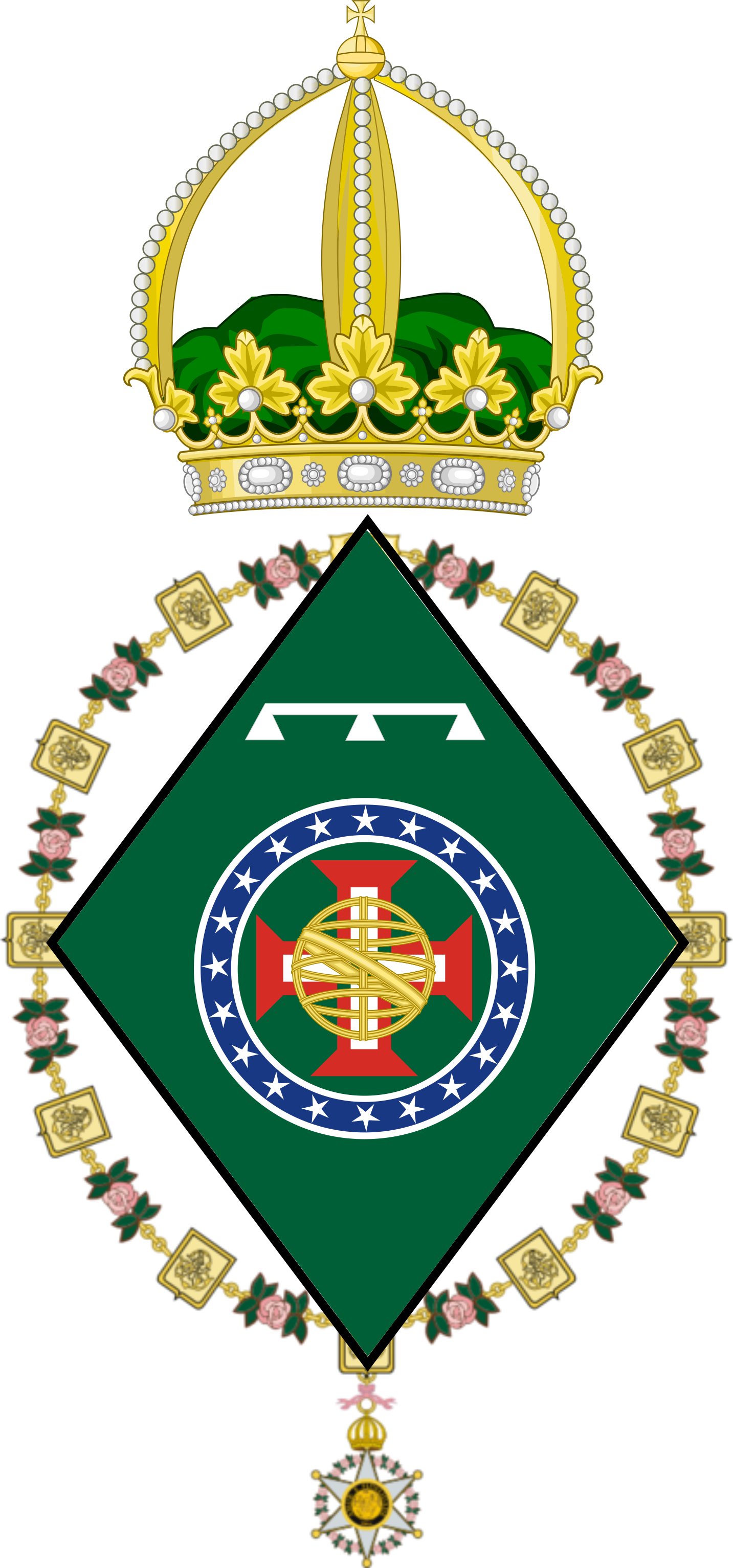
Coat of arms of Isabel, Princess Imperial

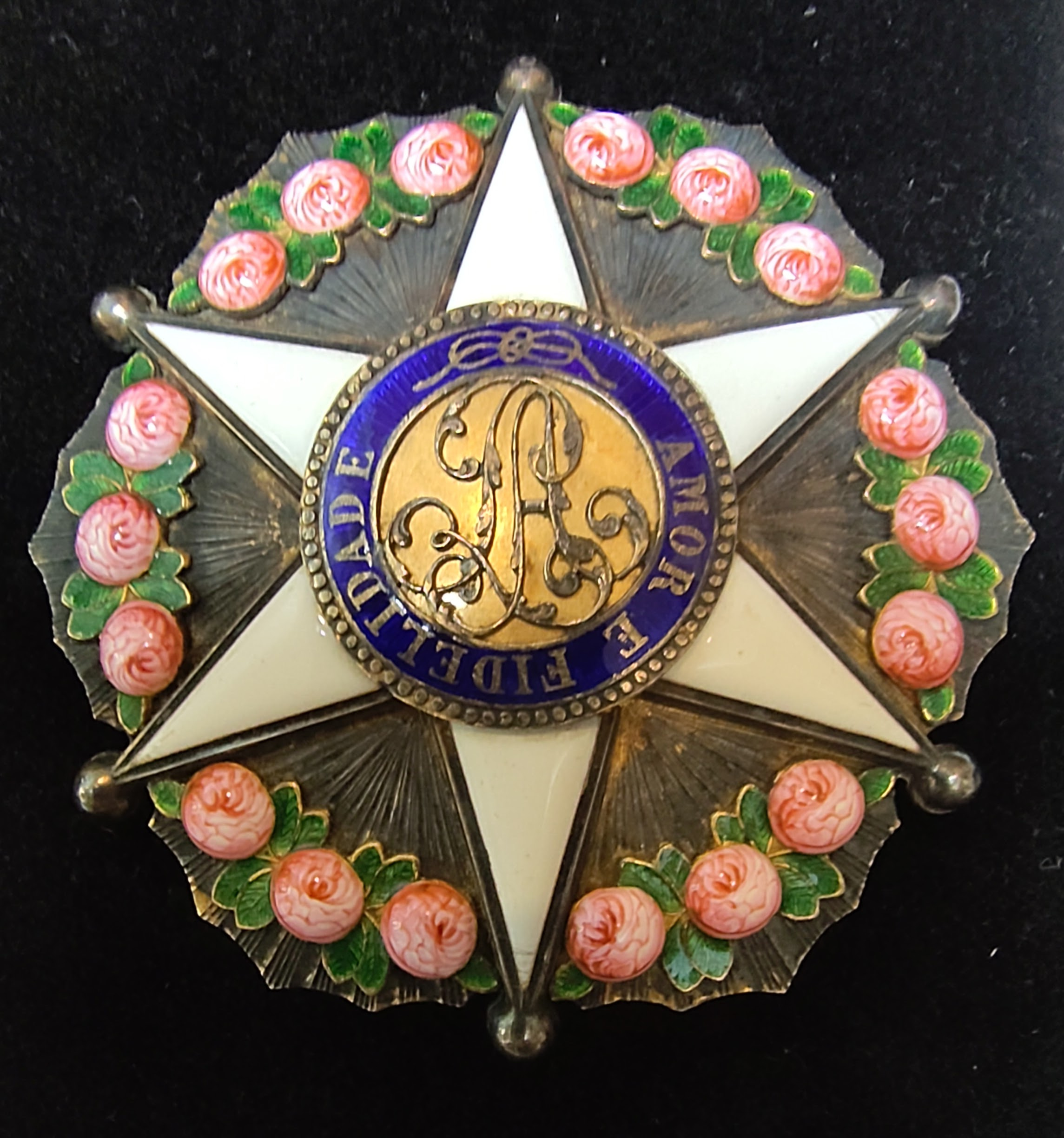
Admiral William Parker was made a “dignitario” of this order on 12^{th} June 1852 for his role as second in command in the Battle of Tonero (December 1851). This is his order

== Recipients ==
- (Empire of Brazil) Afonso, Prince Imperial of Brazil
- (Kingdom of Yugoslavia) Alexander, Crown Prince of Yugoslavia
- Grand Duke Alexei Alexandrovich of Russia
- (Empire of Brazil) Almeida Júnior
- (Empire of Brazil) Luís Alves de Lima e Silva, Duke of Caxias
- (Empire of Brazil) Amélie of Leuchtenberg
- (Empire of Brazil) Prince Antônio Gastão of Orléans-Braganza
- (Empire of Brazil) Prince August Leopold of Saxe-Coburg and Gotha
- (Empire of Brazil) José Luís Mena Barreto
- (United Kingdom) Henry Walter Bates
- (Hamburg) Emil Bauch
- (United Kingdom) John Bramley-Moore
- (United Kingdom) James Brunlees
- (Kingdom of Italy) Ernesto Burzagli
- (Switzerland) Louis Buvelot
- (Norway) Peter Christophersen
- (Belgium) Jules d'Anethan
- (United Kingdom) Warren De la Rue
- (Kingdom of Prussia) Rudolf von Delbrück
- (France) John Hay Drummond Hay
- (Kingdom of Portugal) Ferdinand II of Portugal
- (Kingdom of Portugal) Antônio Ferreira Viçoso
- (Republic of Venice) Marcos Christino Fioravanti
- (United Kingdom) Daniel Makinson Fox
- (Empire of Brazil) Princess Francisca of Brazil
- (Papal States) Annibale de Gasparis
- (France) Gaston, Count of Eu
- (Hamburg) Friedrich Heinrich Geffcken
- (Empire of Brazil) Antônio Carlos Gomes
- (Kingdom of Sardinia) Gaspare Gorresio
- (United Kingdom) John Pascoe Grenfell
- (Kingdom of Hanover) Heinrich Halfeld
- (Empire of Brazil) Joaquim José Inácio, Viscount of Inhaúma
- (Empire of Brazil) Isabel, Princess Imperial of Brazil
- (United Kingdom) William Thomson, 1st Baron Kelvin
- (Empire of Brazil) Princess Leopoldina of Brazil
- (France) Augusto Leverger, Baron of Melgaço
- Prince Ludwig August of Saxe-Coburg and Gotha
- (Tsardom of Bulgaria (1908–1946)) Ferdinand I of Bulgaria
- (Kingdom of Portugal) Luís I of Portugal
- (Brazil) Prince Luiz of Orléans-Braganza
- (Netherlands) Joseph Luns
- (Empire of Brazil) Machado de Assis
- (Empire of Brazil) Gonçalves de Magalhães, Viscount of Araguaia
- (Empire of Brazil) Manuel Antônio Farinha
- (Empire of Brazil) Princess Maria Amélia of Brazil
- (United Kingdom) Clements Markham
- (Empire of Brazil) Victor Meirelles
- (Empire of Brazil) Cândido Mendes de Almeida
- (United Kingdom) John Miers (botanist)
- (Empire of Brazil) Ângelo Moniz da Silva Ferraz, Baron of Uruguaiana
- (Empire of Brazil) Firmino Monteiro
- (Empire of Brazil) Carlos de Morais Camisão
- (Empire of Brazil) José Antônio Moreira, Count of Ipanema
- (United Kingdom) Robert Stirling Newall
- (Sweden) Alfred Nobel
- (United Kingdom) Sir Andrew Noble, 1st Baronet
- (France) George O'Kelly
- (France) Joseph O'Kelly
- Olav V of Norway
- (Kingdom of Portugal) Henrique O'Neill, 1st Viscount of Santa Mónica
- (Kingdom of Portugal) Jorge Torlades O'Neill I
- (Brazil) Prince Bertrand of Orléans-Braganza
- (Empire of Brazil) Honório Hermeto Carneiro Leão, Marquis of Paraná
- (Empire of Brazil) José Paranhos, Viscount of Rio Branco
- (France) Louis Pasteur
- (Empire of Brazil) Pedro I of Brazil
- (Empire of Brazil) Pedro II of Brazil
- (Empire of Brazil) Fernando Pires Ferreira
- (Empire of Brazil) Prince Pedro Augusto of Saxe-Coburg and Gotha
- (Brazil) Pedro Carlos of Orléans-Braganza
- (Brazil) Prince Pedro Gastão of Orléans-Braganza
- (Brazil) Prince Pedro Luiz of Orléans-Braganza
- (Empire of Brazil) Manuel de Araújo Porto-Alegre, Baron of Santo Ângelo
- (Switzerland) James-Ferdinand de Pury
- (Empire of Brazil) Antônio Ricardo dos Santos
- (Spain) Manuel Silvela y Le Vielleuze
- (Empire of Brazil) Lafayette Rodrigues Pereira
- (Empire of Brazil) Pedro Luís Pereira de Sousa
- (Kingdom of Bavaria) Maximilian von Speidel
- (Empire of Brazil) Félix Taunay, Baron of Taunay
- (Belgium) Charles d'Ursel
- (Belgium) Louis van Houtte
- (Portugal) Duarte Pio, Duke of Braganza
- (Portugal) Afonso, Prince of Beira
- (Andorra) Adrià Espineta Arias
- Albert I, Prince of Monaco
- (Empire of Brazil) Domingos Malaquias de Aguiar Pires Ferreira, 1st Baron of Cimbres

Admiral William Parker - 12th June 1852
