= Heinrich Halfeld =

German engineer

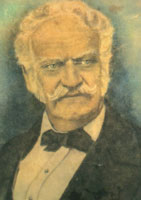
Halfeld's portrait.

Heinrich Wilhelm Ferdinand Halfeld, also known in Portuguese as Henrique Guilherme Fernando Halfeld, (23 February 1797 – 22 November 1873) was a German engineer.

He was born in Clausthal-Zellerfeld, Kingdom of Hanover, and studied at the Bergakademie Clausthal. He moved to Brazil in 1825, where he lived until his last days. He is most famous for having planned the development of a part of the inner region of the Brazilian state of Minas Gerais, especially that of the city of Juiz de Fora. He died in Juiz de Fora, Brazil.

== Biography ==
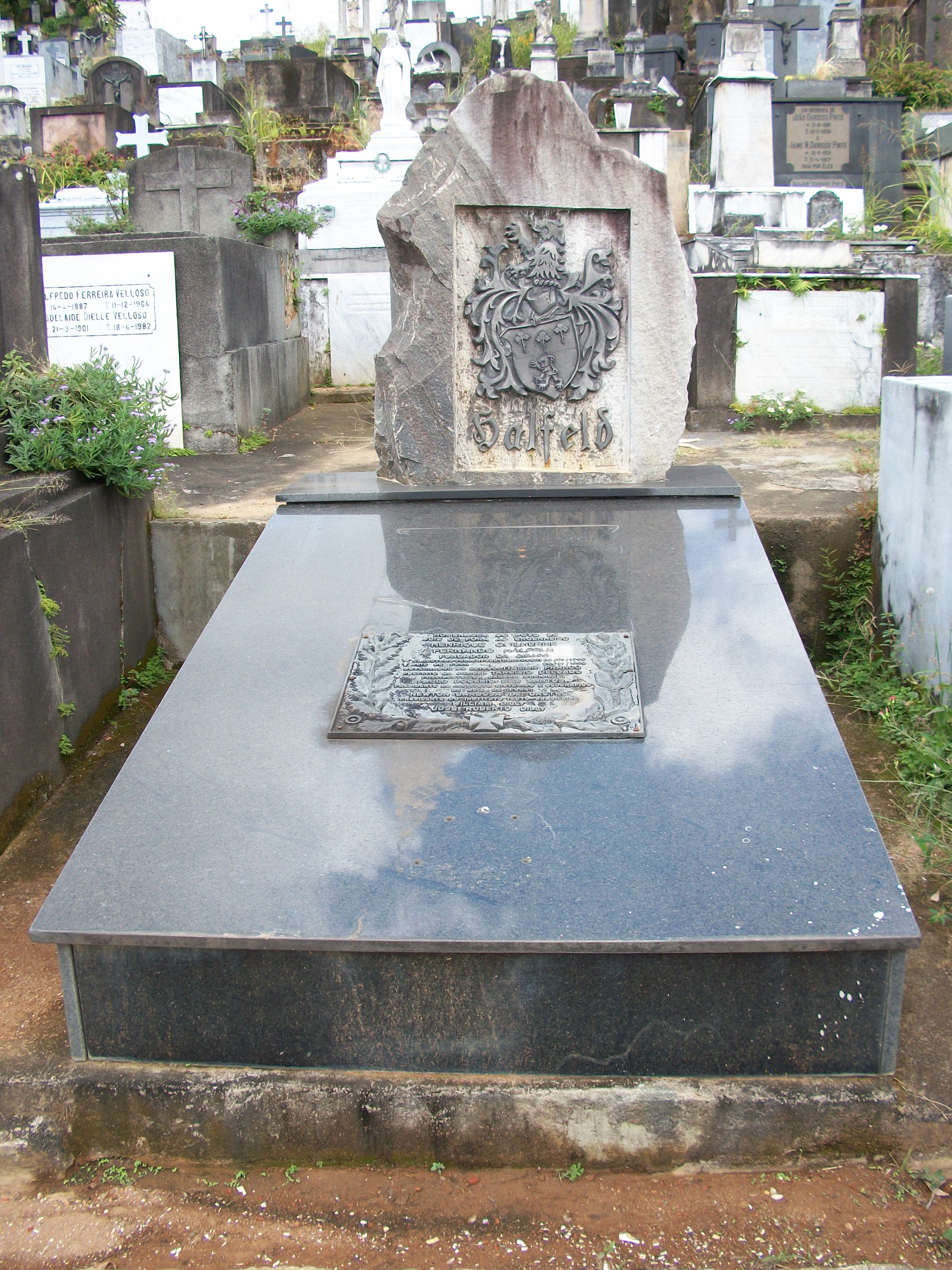
Halfeld's grave in the Graveyard of Juiz de Fora.

Son of Carl August Gottfried Halfeld and Dorothea Antonietta Elster, Heinrich Halfeld joined the Army when 18 years old as a second lieutenant, fighting for the expulsion of French troops from Germany and afterwards in the Battle of Waterloo, when he was hit in the face. He also worked in the mining in the Harz and married Dorothea Augusta Filipina on 10 April 1824.

He migrated to Brazil in 1825, when he came aboard the ship "Doris" to be part of the Imperial Corps of Foreigners. His firstborn son, Pedro Maria, was born short after his arrival. After his contract expired, he worked at the S. João Del Rey Mining Company and afterwards in the mines of the Baron of Cocais.

In 1834 he bought a sesmaria on the shore of the Piracicaba River and in 1836 was named "Engineer of the Province of Minas Gerais", when he started living in Ouro Preto (then Vila Rica). He was designated to build the Road of the Paraibuna River, linking Vila Rica, the then capital of the Province of Minas Gerais, to the Paraibuna, on the border with the Province of Rio de Janeiro. The new road allowed the integration of Minas Gerais and the birth of the city of Juiz de Fora. This city's first layout was planned by Halfeld.

His first wife died in Ouro Preto, on 13 May 1839. He got married a second time on 8 January 1840, with Cândida Maria Carlota, daughter of his host, Lieutenant Antônio Dias Tostes. In 1842, at the rank of Captain of Engineering, takes part in the victory of loyal Imperial troops in the Battle of Santa Luzia. For his loyal services at the battlefield, he was granted the Order of the Rose.

He was designated in 1852 for the beaconing of the São Francisco River, having traveled and explored the river with its tributaries from Pirapora to the Atlantic Ocean along a total of more than 2,000 km. His report is still consulted in the present. He became a widower again in 1866, and in the following year got married a third time with Maria Luiza da Cunha Pinto Coelho. He had 16 children altogether from his 3 marriages.

He died, on 22 November 1873, by a shot fired while he cleaned his weapon. He was an important planner of road in the states of Minas Gerais and Rio de Janeiro, and is one of the most important historical personalities of the city of Juiz de Fora. He is considered its founder. Every year, during the city's birthday ceremonies, the medal Mérito Comendador Henrique Guilherme Fernando Halfeld is given to those who have done relevant things in any area to the city.

Halfeld is the patriarch of the Halfeld family in Brazil.

== Bibliography ==
- Roland Spliesgart: (in German) „Verbrasilianerung“ und Akkulturation: deutsche Protestanten im brasilianischen Kaiserreich am Beispiel der Gemeinden in Rio de Janeiro und Minas Gerais (1822–1889). Harrassowitz Verlag, Wiesbaden, 2006, P. 148f (Digitalized on Google Books)
