= Gaspare Gorresio =

19th-century Italian Orientalist and Indologist

Gaspare Gorresio (Bagnasco, 18 July 1808 – Turin, 20 May 1891) was an Italian Orientalist and Indologist, best known for his translation of the Valmiki Ramayana, the great Hindu epic.

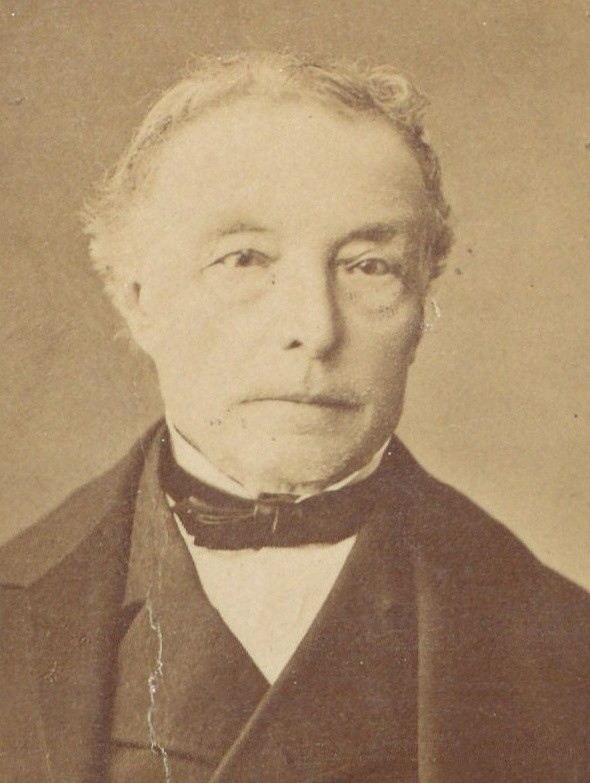
Portrait of Gaspare Gorresio, was an Italian Orientalist.

== Biography ==
=== Early life ===
Gorresio was born on 18 January 1807 to Giovanni Baptista, a notary, and Clotilde Dealberti. He studied at the diocesan seminary of Mondovi, following which he went to the University of Turin. He majored in philology in 1830 under the guidance of the noted Semitic scholar Amedeo Peyron. A Genoese nobleman and scholar Marquis Antonio Brignole-Sale sponsored his subsequent education at Vienna in classical philology.

Upon his return to Turin in 1832, he obtained the post of lecturer of history at the Military Academy. His publications on mythology, the poetry of Pindar, dramatic art, and the affinity between German, Latin and Greek were appreciated, resulting in promotion to the Faculty of Arts.

In 1837, he founded the scientific and literary journal The Subalpine with Carlo Marenco and Carlo Bon Compagni di Mombello. The same year, attracted by the philological research at the Indology school of Eugène Burnouf, he travelled to Paris. Here he was mainly absorbed in Sanskrit studies under Burnouf, and was to become a close friend of the Frenchman. He also learned Chinese under the Sinologist Stanislas Julien.

=== Indology ===
Encouraged by Burnouf, Gorresio took on the challenge of preparing a complete edition of the Indian epic, Ramayana. Over a period of twenty-four years from 1846, his edition appeared in twelve volumes, the first in Europe. The first five volumes contained the edited text of the Bengali or Gauda recension of the epic. The Italian translation appeared in 1847 as volume VI of the work.

At the time, there were two recensions of the Ramayana extant - a North Indian and a Bengali (or Gauda). The former was preferred by Gorresio's German contemporaries as it was the older, but he chose the latter for its superior literary and aesthetic quality. Gorresio carefully collated manuscripts held at the Bibliothèque royale in Paris, and later at the Royal Society and East India House in London, where he arrived in 1841. With the advice of Horace Hayman Wilson, a professor of Sanskrit at Oxford University, Gorresio studied various commentaries on the Ramayana, notably the Manohara of Lokānatha Cakravartin and the Rāmāyaṇa Tilaka of Ragunātha Vācaspati, as well as commentaries by Kullūkabhaṭṭa and earlier research by August von Schlegel.

The introduction to the first volume of Gorresio's series accurately set out the contradictions and interpolations that accrued over the ages in the Ramayana text. The precision of his critical commentary and the insight of his aesthetic valuation, the charm of expression and the diligence of the translation earned him many accolades, among them appointment to the Accademia della Crusca in 1867.

In 1852, Gorresio returned to Turin where he was awarded the first chair in Sanskrit established in Italy.

=== Later life ===
In 1859, Gorresio was appointed to the post of the Director of the University Library of Turin, as well as permanent secretary of the Academy of Sciences of Turin. Many honours were showered upon him, including a fellowship of the Royal Asiatic Society of London, the Société académique indo-chinoise in Paris, and the Accademia dei Lincei in Rome.

Gorresio died on 20 May 1891 in Turin.

== Awards and honours ==
=== Italian ===
- Civil Order of Savoy
- Order of the Crown of Italy
- Order of Saints Maurice and Lazarus

=== Foreign ===
- Order of Guadalupe, Mexico
- Order of the Rose, Brazil
- Legion of Honour, France

== Bibliography ==
- Rāmāyaṇa, poema indiano di Valmici. Paris: Stamperia Reale. 1843–1870. (In octavo, comprising Ādikāṇḍa, Ayodhyākāṇḍa, Araṇyakāṇḍa, Kiṣkindhyākāṇḍa, Sundarakāṇḍa, Yuddhakāṇḍa, Uttarakāṇḍa.)
- Rāmāyaṇa. Milan. 1869–1870. (Limited edition in 3 volumes.)
- "Unità d'origine dei popoli indo-europei". Proceedings of the Turin Academy of Sciences (in Italian). II. 1866–1867.
- "Uttarakāṇḍa". Proceedings of the Turin Academy of Sciences. IV. 1868–1869.
- "Uttarakāṇḍa". Proceedings of the Turin Academy of Sciences. V. 1869–1870.
- "Le fonti dell'epopea e l'Uttarakāṇḍa". Rivista orientale (in Italian). 1867. (Part of the Introduction to the Uttarakāṇḍa.)
- "Dei manoscritti che si trovano nelle publiche e private biblioteche dell'India". Proceedings of the Turin Academy of Sciences (in Italian). IX: 652–668. 1874. (Bibliographical notes on Indian manuscripts.)
- "Idea generale di un'opera sulle civiltà arye". Proceedings of the Turin Academy of Sciences (in Italian). IX: 668. 1874. (General notes for a work on the Aryan civilisation.)
- "I Vedi". Proceedings of the Turin Academy of Sciences (in Italian). XIV: 469–483. 1878–1879. (On the Vedas)
- "I climi e le condizioni naturali dell'India: sunto di una lettura". Proceedings of the Turin Academy of Sciences (in Italian). XV: 419–427. 1879–1880.
- "Del catalogo dei manoscritti sanscriti che si pubblica nelle varie parti dell'India". Proceedings of the Turin Academy of Sciences (in Italian). XXII: 280. 1886–1887. (A catalogue of Sanskrit publications in various parts of India.)
