= Emil Bauch =

German painter

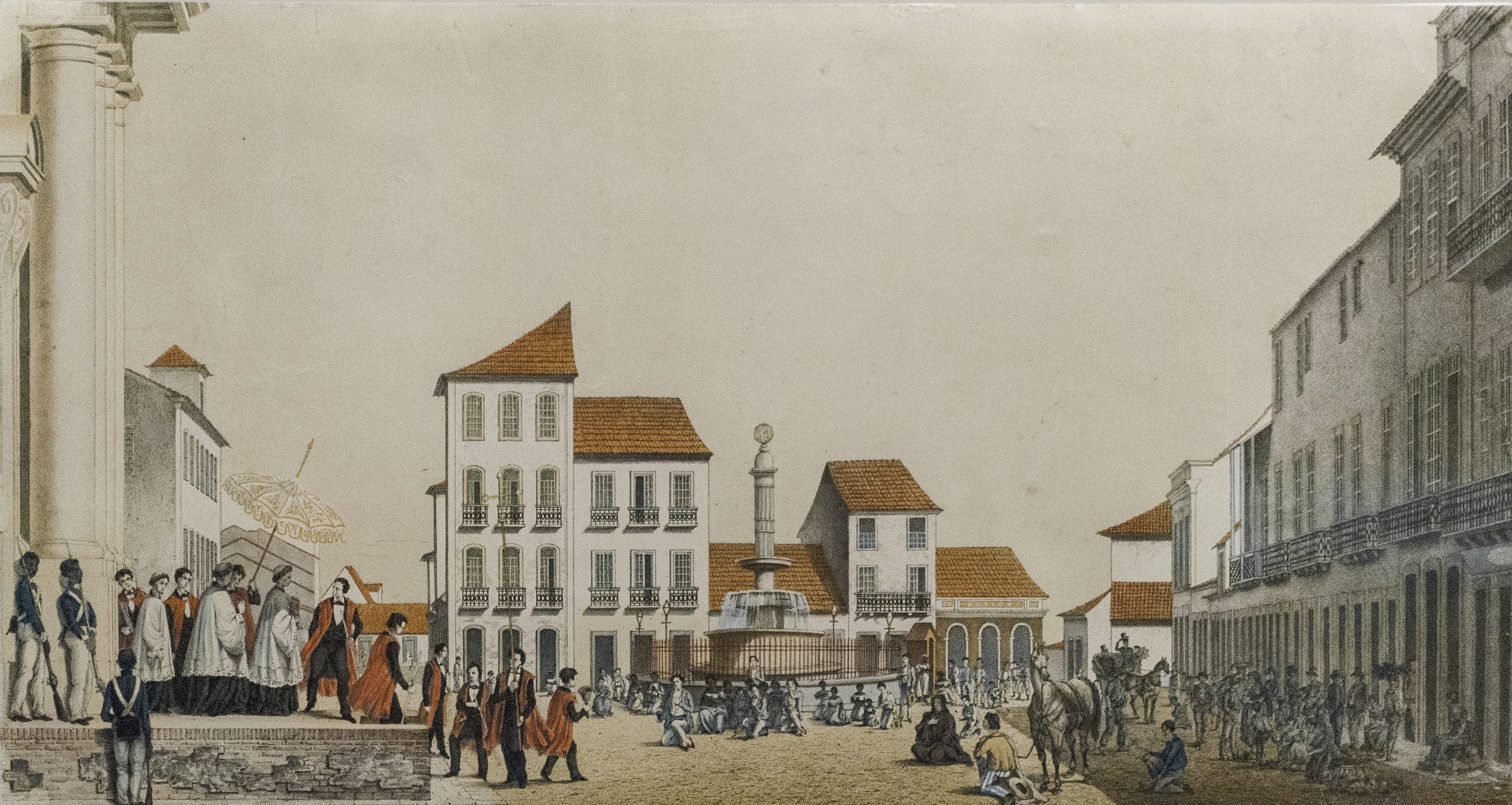
Largo da Matriz da Boa Vista by Emil Bauch

Emil Bauch (1823 – after 1874) was a German painter, lithographer and teacher who came to reside in Rio de Janeiro, Brazil. He painted panoramic city scenes and portraits, as well as some views of Recife and Salvador. His landscapes are conspicuous by his close observation of all the details and the intense variety of motifs of his palette. (Note: Following a taste of the time, many artists developed techniques to improve the so-called "landscape paintings", which represent the landscape from a fixed point and with a 360 degrees around this same point. Rio de Janeiro, with its breathtaking natural scenery, its huge and exotic bay, was an ideal target for this type of representation.) His works have all but disappeared in the shadow of paintings created by other artists during the second half of the nineteenth century in Brazil.

== Biography ==
He was born in Hamburg. He began his training as an artist in the city of Munich between 1842 and 1844. (Note: Judging by the quality of his work, he may have had his talent for painting discovered at a very early age and also studied with qualified teachers.) Having arrived from Germany in 1849, he first settled in Recife, a bustling city under the rule of Francisco do Rego Barros, painting so the diversity of aspects of the capital of Pernambuco. (Note: That would become the theme of his beautiful chromolithographs published in 1851 in Germany.)

In 1856 he was in the Brazilian Court, which had been transferred to Rio de Janeiro, and then opened his studio at Rua do Rosario, 106 – 2nd floor, moving years later to Rua Sete de Setembro, 72. In 1859 he won the silver medal in the General Exhibition of the Imperial Academy of Fine Arts and struck gold in 1860. In 1865 he joins the great French landscape artist Henri Nicolas Vinet, and so both began teaching painting and drawing in the studio mounted on Rua da Quitanda, 27. By the year 1872 the two artists would then have parted ways. In 1866 he is invited by the architect Carl Friedrich Gustav Waehneldt to decorate the interior of the Nova Friburgo Palace, later known as the Catete Palace together with Gastão Tassini and Mario Bragaldi.

In 1873 he painted Panorama do Rio de Janeiro where the Pão de Açúcar, Tijuca, Botafogo and Gloria appear, causing a great sensation at the Academia Imperial de Belas Artes. In 1874 he was knighted the Imperial Order of the Rose, a title awarded by the Imperial Academy of Fine Arts. He died in the city of Rio de Janeiro 16 years later. (Note: Maria Elizabeth Santos Peixoto, in her book on German painters, reports that "It appears that the German artist died insane in the city of Rio de Janeiro on an unknown date.")

== Chronology ==
- 1842–1844 – Munich, DE – He is trained as an artist in Munich.
- 1844–1849 – Hamburg, DE – He works as a portrait painter in Hamburg.
- 1849–1852 – Recife, PE – He travels as a trained artist with a reputation of landscape painter.
- 1852 – Germany – The album Souvenirs de Pernambuco, a collection of chromolitographic works of his trip to Recife, is published.
- 1852 – Rio de Janeiro, RJ – He lives in the city of Rio de Janeiro.
- 1859–1862 – Rio de Janeiro, RJ. He takes part in the General Exhibition of 1859, 1860, 1862, 1872.
- 1865-1872 – Rio de Janeiro, RJ – He joins the painter Henri Nicolas Vinet, is committed to teaching landscape painting in his private workshop.
- 1866 – Rio de Janeiro, RJ – He is invited by architect the Carl Friedrich Gustav Waehneldt to be one of the painters for the initial work of Nova Friburgo Palace, later known as the Catete Palace (now the Republic Museum).
- 1873 – Rio de Janeiro, RJ – He finishes the painting Panorama do Rio de Janeiro, where the Sugar Loaf and the neighborhoods of Gloria, Botafogo, Lapa, Campo de Santana, Tijuca and Andaraí appears, causing thus a great sensation.
- 1874 – Rio de Janeiro, RJ – He is knighted with the Imperial Order of the Rose by the Imperial Academy of Fine Arts (AIBA).

== Bibliography ==
- Pontual, Roberto. Dicionário das artes plásticas no Brasil. Rio de Janeiro: Civilização Brasileira, 1969.
- Braga, Teodoro. Artistas pintores no Brasil. São Paulo: São Paulo Edit., 1942.
- Leite, José Roberto Teixeira. Dicionário crítico da pintura no Brasil. Rio de Janeiro: Artlivre, 1988.
- Levy, Carlos Roberto Maciel. Exposições Gerais da Academia Imperial e da Escola Nacional de Belas Artes. Rio de Janeiro: Pinakotheke, 1990.
- Ferrez, Gilberto. O Recife de Emil Bauch – 1852. Published 1984 by [s.n.] in Rio de Janeiro.
- Peixoto, Maria Elizabete Santos. Pintores alemães no Brasil durante o século XIX. Rio de Janeiro: Pinakotheke, 1989. (text in Portuguese, German and English)

== Gallery ==
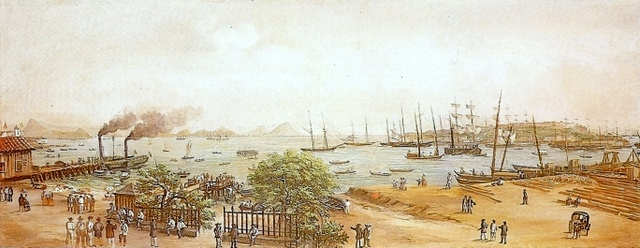
Cais Pharoux, Rio de Janeiro

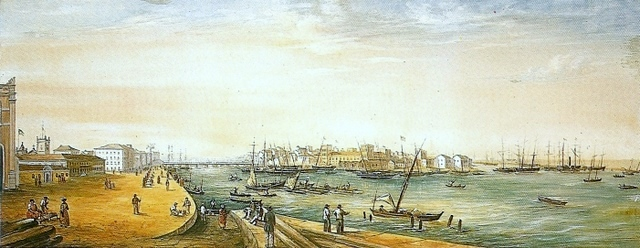
Porto de Recife

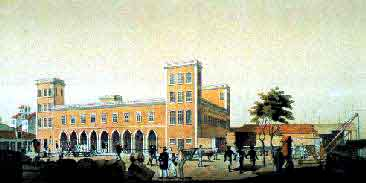
Recife alfandega

== See also ==
- List of German painters

== Additional informations ==
=== References ===
Attribution

- This article is based on the translation of the corresponding article of the Portuguese Wikipedia. A list of contributors can be found there at the History section.
