= San Felice a Cancello =

- Comune
- Comune di San Felice a Cancello
- Coat of arms

- Location within Italy Location within Campania
- Coordinates: 41°1′N 14°29′E
- Country: Italy
- Region: Campania
- Province: Caserta (CE)
- Frazioni: Botteghino, Cancello, Casazenca, Cave, Grotticella, Piedarienzo, Polvica, Ponti Rossi, San Felice (capital), San Marco, Talanico, Trotti, Vigliotti

Government
  - Mayor: Commissar due to mafia

Area
  - Total: 27.18 km^{2} (10.49 sq mi)
- Elevation: 89 m (292 ft)

Population (31 December 2017)
  - Total: 17,462
  - Density: 642.5/km^{2} (1,664/sq mi)
- Demonym: Sanfeliciani
- Time zone: UTC+1 (CET)
  - Summer (DST): UTC+2 (CEST)
- Postal code: 81027 (capoluogo, San Felice), 81020 Cancello di Ferrovia (Cancello, San Marco Trotti)
- Dialing code: 0823
- Patron saint: San Felice
- Website: Official website

San Felice a Cancello is a comune (municipality) in the Province of Caserta in the Italian region Campania, located about 30 kilometres (19 mi) northeast of Naples and about 14 kilometres (9 mi) southeast of Caserta.

It has a mostly agricultural economy.
