= Marcos Christino Fioravanti =

Italian surgeon

Marcos Christino Fioravanti (1775–1859) was an Italian surgeon who served in the Royal British Navy and co-founded the town of Santo Antônio da Patrulha in Rio Grande do Sul, Brazil.

== Biography ==
Fioravanti was born in 1775 (or 1779) on the Ionic Island of Santa Maura, in what was then the Republic of Venice, to Francisco Ângelo Fioravanti. He graduated in Medicine and went to serve in the Napoleonic Wars as a doctor in the Royal British Navy.

In 1803, when serving as the surgeon of HMS Seahorse, he disembarked in Brazil at the town of the Desterro in (what today is known as Florianópolis), and from there went on to settle in Osório in Rio Grande do Sul.

On June 17, 1804 in Osório he married Emerenciana Maria of Jesus Joaquina Bittencourt, daughter of Francisco Bittencourt and of Dona Ana of Jesus, according to the register of the N.S. of Conceição Church. in Liv. o1, fls. 16 of marriages. They had 11 children, the eldest was Candica Inácia Christina Fioravanti, born on March 15, 1805, followed by Marcos Christino Patrulhense Fioravanti (b. 1807), Anselmo Christino Fioravanti (b. 1811), Antônio Ângelo Christino Fioravanti (b. 1813), Maximilia Jônia Christina Fioravanti (b. 1816), Anatácia Fioravanti (b. 1817), Luiza Fioravanti (b. 1820), etc.

On December 7, 1809, after being approved in an exam in Brazil, his letter of Surgeon was recognized and confirmed.

The registers show that on April 3, 1811, Fioravanti co-founded the Town of Santo Antônio da Patrulha. There he built the first two-story house in the town, where he lived until 1856, when he sold all his properties and moved with his family to São Borja.

He built a Baroque style fountain that supplied water to the city. The Imperial coat of arms was placed on this fountain in 1826, when the Emperor Dom Pedro I drank from it during his visit to the town with the Imperial Army.

In 1837, Marcos Christino Fioravanti married his second wife Dona Cândica Gomes de Almeida and they issued Florisbela Christina Fioravanti (b. 1838) and Cipriana Gomes de Almeida Fioravbanti (1840.

On July 2, 1854 Fioravanti was favored by the Emperor of Brazil, Dom Pedro II, with the officership of the Order of the Rose.

== Death ==
Marcos Christino Fioravanti died in São Borja, RS in 25 March 1859, at the age of 80 years (register São Francisco Church - São Borja).

One of Marcos Fioravanti's descendants include João Neves da Fontoura, senator, Minister of the External Relations of Brazil, and member of the Brazilian Academy of Letters, who died in 1963. His descendants in the direct primogeniture line includes: Marcos Christino Patrulhense Fioravanti B. 1807), who was the father of Marcos Christino Patrulhense Fioravanti Junior (b. 1849) who was the father of 10 children, the male was the second, Alberto Fioravanti (b. 1873), father of Augusto Fioravanti (b. 1905), the father of Alberto Rosa Fioravanti (b. 1942), the father of Luís Pierre Augusto da Cruz Fioravanti (b. 1963), and the father of Alberto Rosa Fioravanti Neto (b. 1994).

== Legacy ==
Descendants of Marcos Christino Fioravanti are now spread through the southern states of Brazil, neighbouring countries of Brazil, United States of America and Canadá.

== Sources ==
1. Santo Antonio da Patrulha, Re-conhecendo sua História. De Corália Ramos Benfica, et al. EST Edições, Porto Alegre, 2000.
2. Viagem pela Provincia do Rio Grande do Sul. De Robert Avé-Lallemant, Editora Itatiaia Limitada, 1980.
3. Jornais do Instituto Histórico Geografico de SAP.
