= Fioravanti family =

Italian noble family

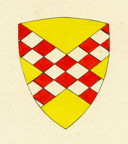
- Coat of arms most commonly associated with the Fioravanti family (chequered saltire)
- Country: Italy
- Origin: Pistoia, Tuscany, Italy
- Founded: 13th century
- Estates: Palazzo Fioravanti (Pistoia); Palazzo Fioravanti (Florence)

The Fioravanti family was an Italian noble family originating in Pistoia in Tuscany and later active in Florence and other Italian cities. The family was aligned with the Guelph political faction and maintained alliances with the Cancellieri family, frequently opposing the Ghibelline Panciatichi family. Members of the family held civic offices and participated in commerce, banking, military service, and religious patronage from the late medieval period through the early modern era.

== History ==
=== Origins in Pistoia ===
The earliest documented references to members of the Fioravanti family date to the 13th century in Pistoia. In 1267, Fioravanti d’Accorso is recorded as a member of the municipal council. In 1310, his son Ranieri served as mayor of Pistoia, and in 1319 Simone di Ranieri was a member of the city’s elders.

Giovanni di Puccio di Ranieri Fioravanti is documented as a banker active at the court of Pope Clement V in Avignon during the early 14th century.

Another member of the family, Andrea di Simone di Baldo Fioravanti, was elected Capitano della Montagna Superiore on 17 June 1354.

=== Commerce, trade, and banking ===
From the late 13th century, branches of the Fioravanti family engaged in international commerce, including the purchase of English wool for processing and resale in Florence and the importation of spices through Venetian trade routes. Members of the family also participated in grain trading and, at times, owned ships rather than relying exclusively on chartered transport.

The Fioravanti maintained long-standing financial ties with the Acciaioli family and increasingly participated in Florentine political life during the oligarchic period associated with the Albizzi, prior to the rise of Cosimo de’ Medici.

== Florentine branch and civic activity ==
=== Neri di Fioravanti ===
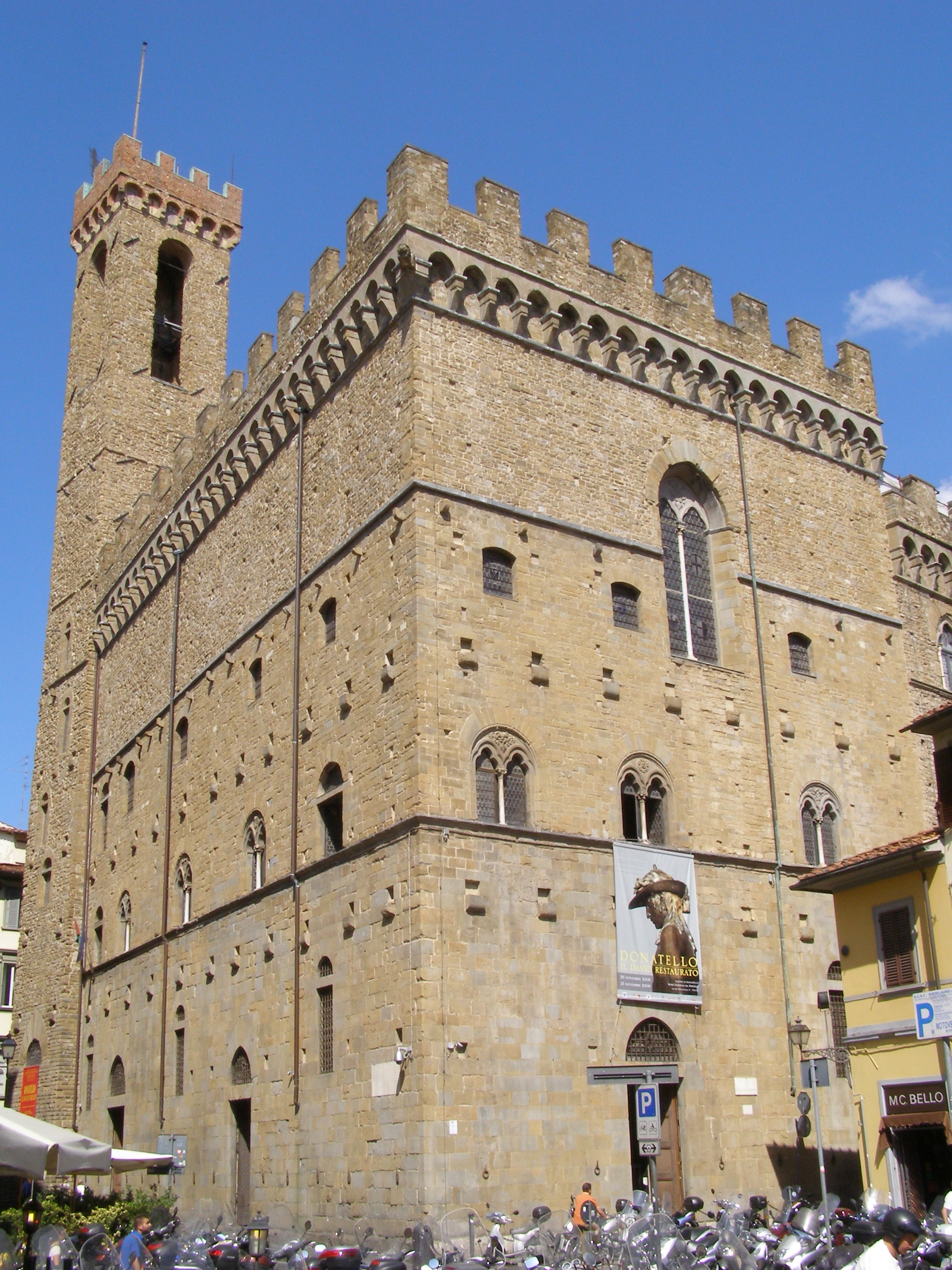
The Bargello, or Palazzo del Podestà, expanded during the period associated with Neri di Fioravanti

Neri di Fioravanti, also recorded as Fieravante, was among the most prominent members of the family active in Florentine public life during the 14th century. He served as a prior of Florence in 1344, 1353, 1358, 1362, and 1366.

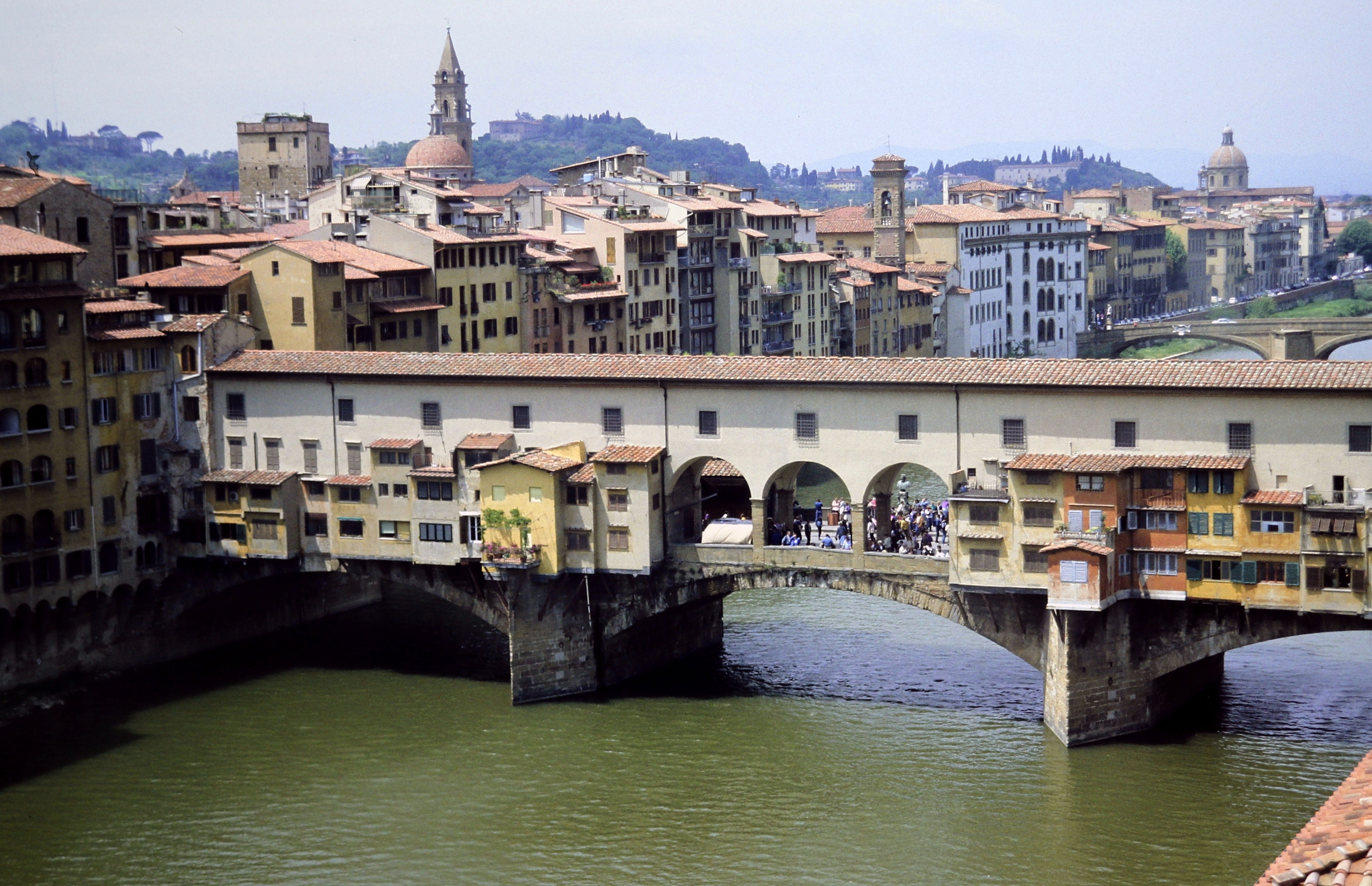
The Ponte Vecchio, traditionally associated with the rebuilding directed by Neri di Fioravanti

He is documented in connection with the expansion of the Palazzo del Podestà, now the Bargello, whose vaulting system and distinctive five-sided plan the so called"quinto quarto". Neri Fioravanti is also associated with early proposals for a double-shell dome and served in consultative and supervisory roles at Florence Cathedral. According to later tradition, he argued that the flying buttresses fashionable elsewhere in Europe were barbarous in appearance and inappropriate for Florentine architecture.as well as ecclesiastical projects at Santissima Annunziata and Sant’Anna dei Lombardi.

Florence Cathedral, where Neri di Fioravanti is documented in consultative and supervisory roles in designing the Quinto Quarto shape and the double dome.

=== Francesco di Neri Fioravanti ===
Francesco di Neri Fioravanti remained active in Florentine government between 1374 and 1398, serving as prior, twice as Gonfaloniere, and as ambassador to Siena and to the papacy.

== Architecture, patronage, and legacy ==
=== Palazzo Fioravanti ===
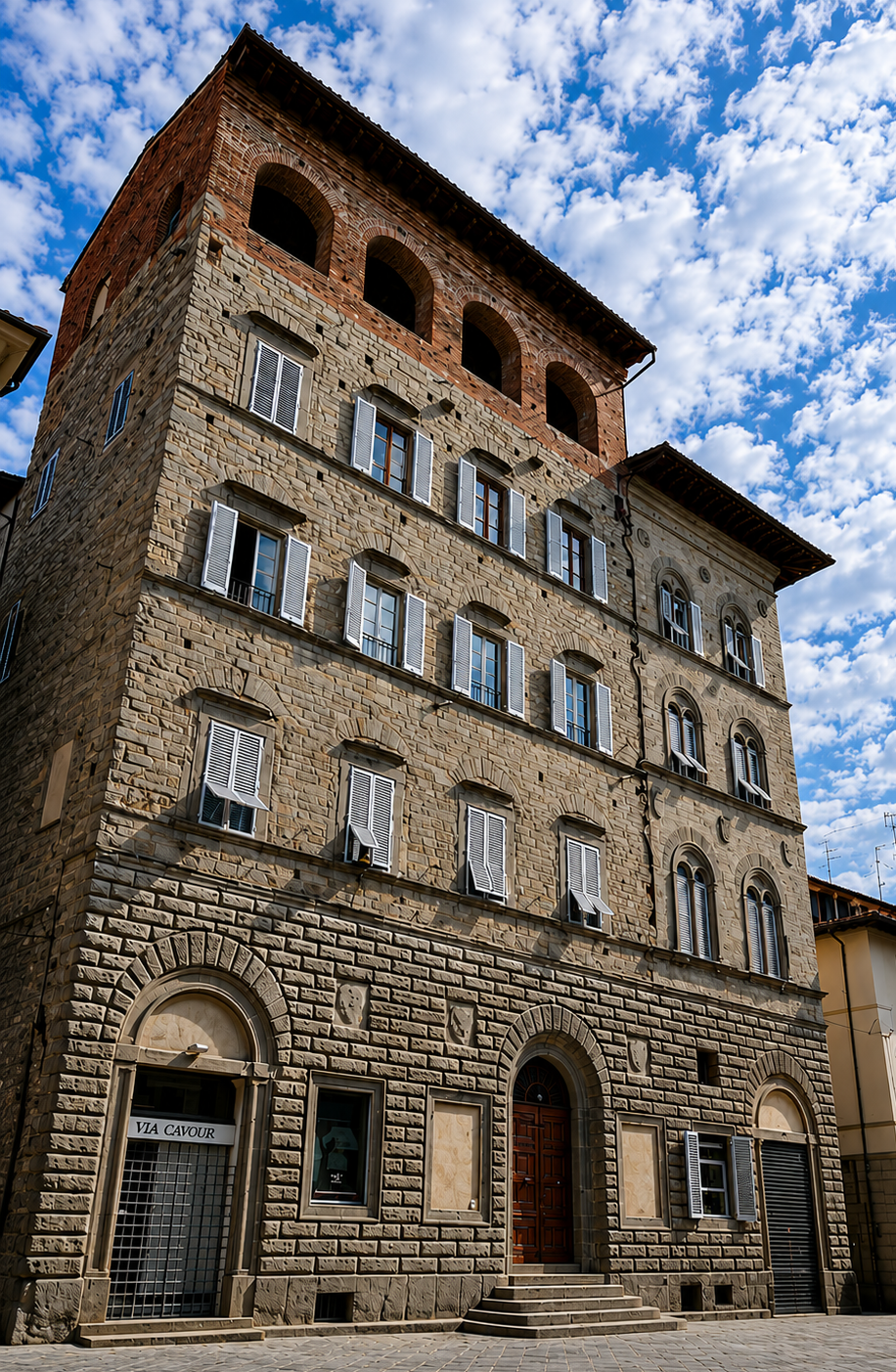
Palazzo Fioravanti, Via Cavour, Pistoia.

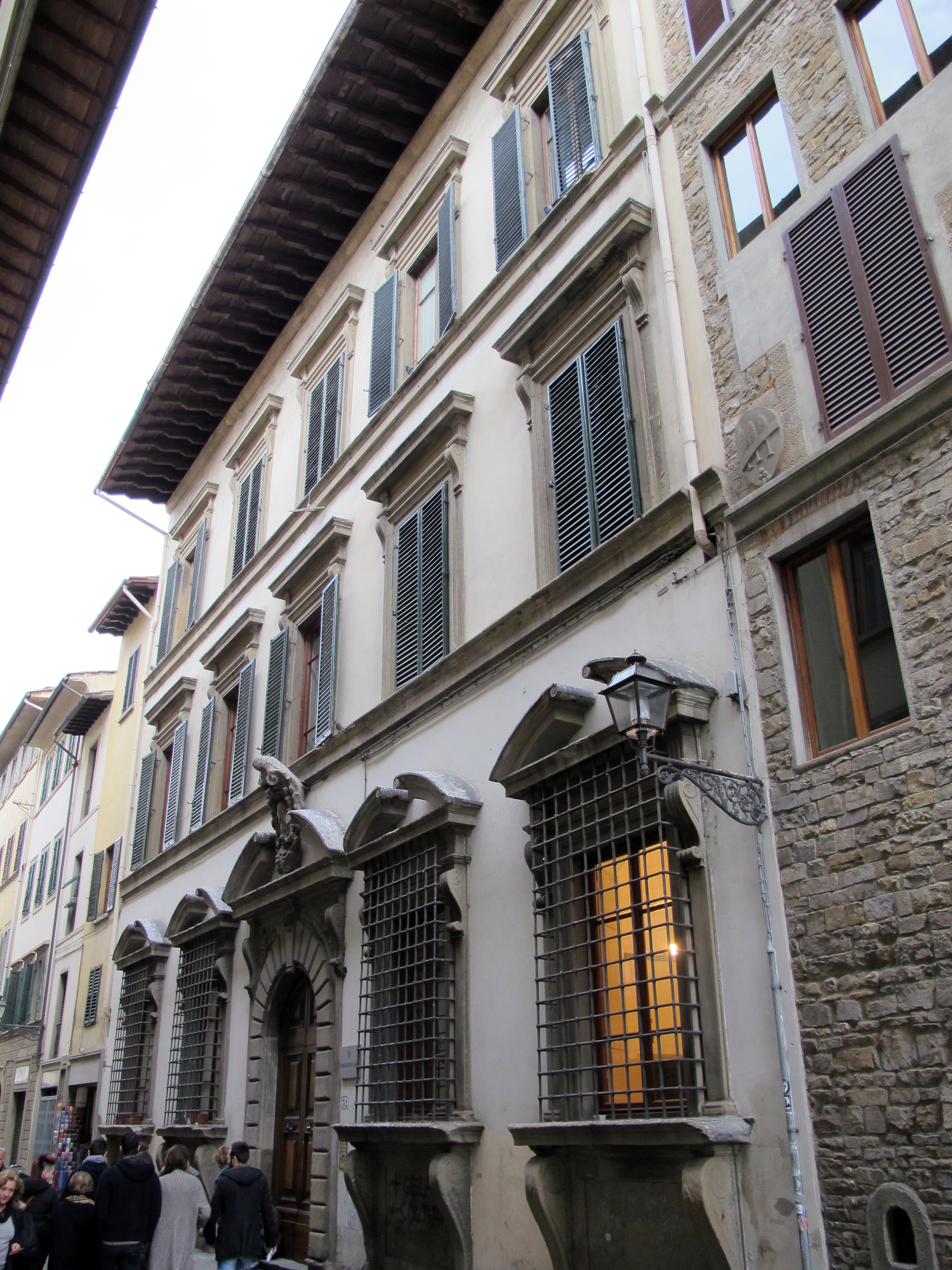
Palazzo Fioravanti, Via Pietrapiana 32, Florence

Palazzo Fioravanti in Pistoia, whose façade bears heraldic symbols identifying the family as Guelf Gonfalonieri. The family also maintained a residence in Florence known as Palazzo Fioravanti, a late Mannerist structure variously attributed in historical sources to Bartolomeo Ammannati or Bernardo Buontalenti.

=== Oratorio di Sant’Antonio Abate (Pistoia) ===
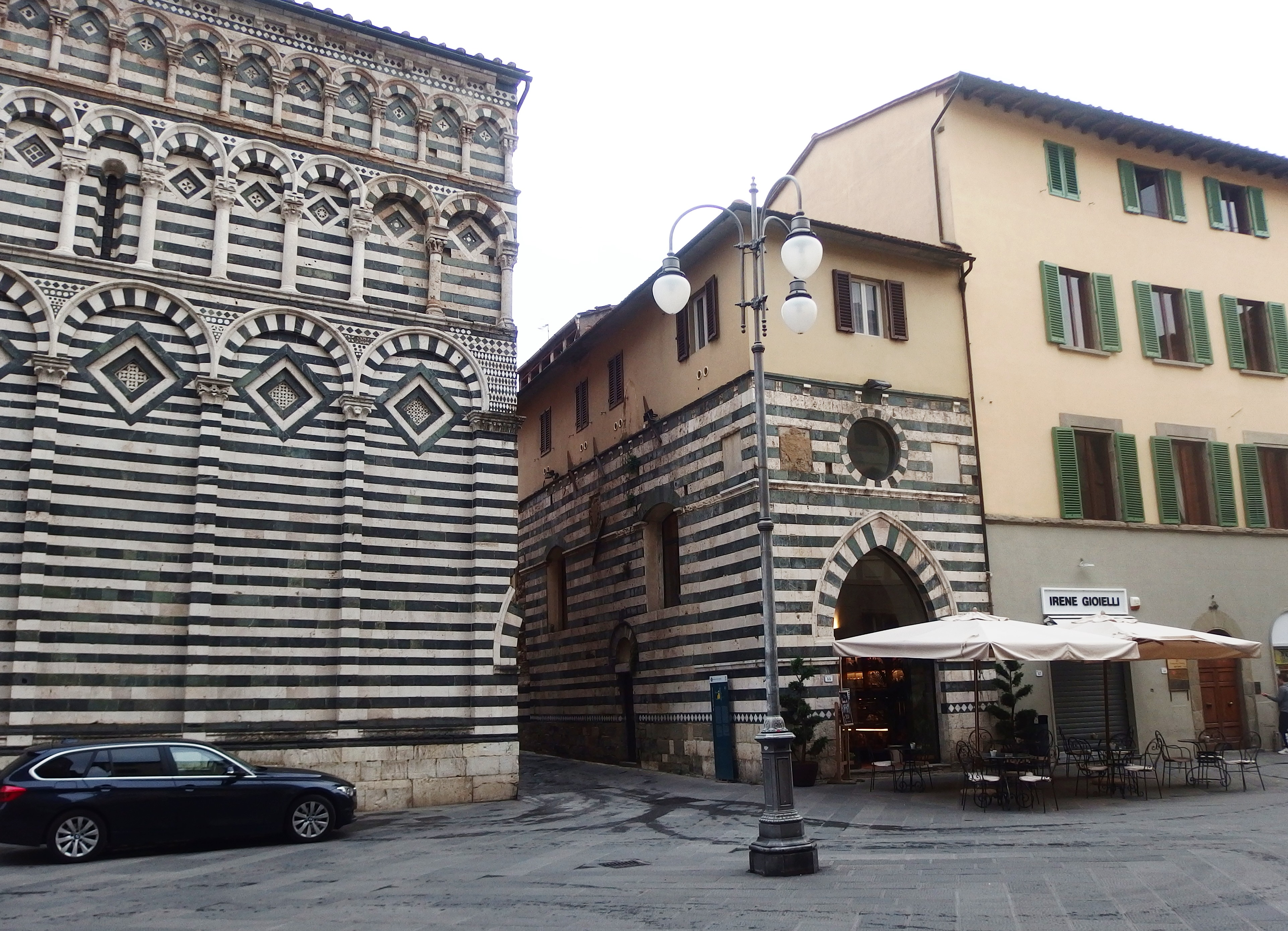
The Oratorio di Sant'Antonio Abate, right, beside the church of San Giovanni Fuoricivitas

The Fioravanti family founded the Oratorio di Sant’Antonio Abate in Pistoia in 1333 for use by the church of San Giovanni Fuorcivitas. Surviving architectural and decorative elements incorporating the family’s coat of arms attest to direct family patronage.

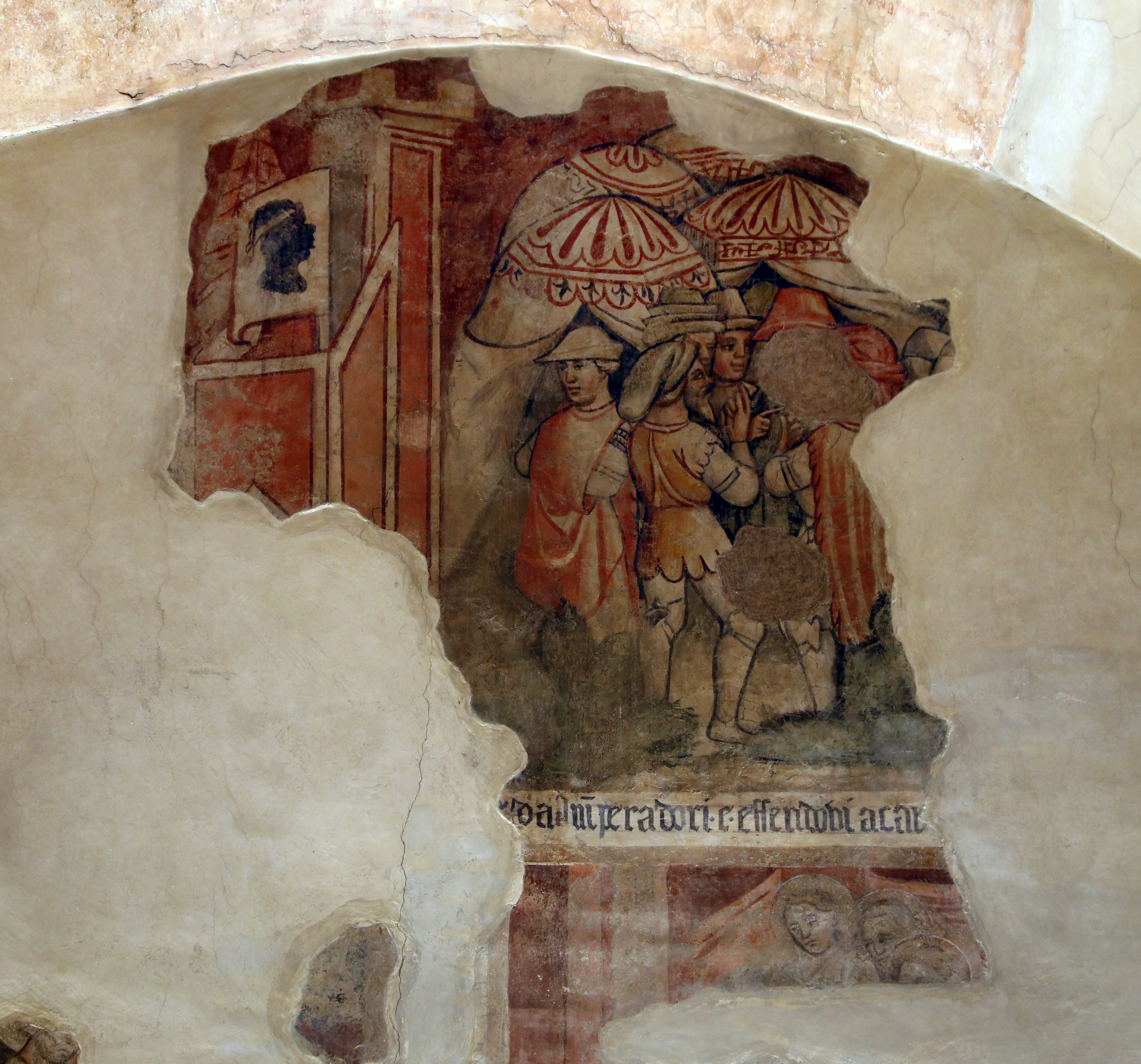
Fourteenth-century fresco decoration inside the former oratory, commissioned under Fioravanti patronage

The oratory preserves visual evidence of the family's role in religious patronage in Pistoia. The family arms appear in several surviving architectural details, including the doorway and stone lintel.

Fioravanti heraldic details at the Oratorio di Sant’Antonio Abate

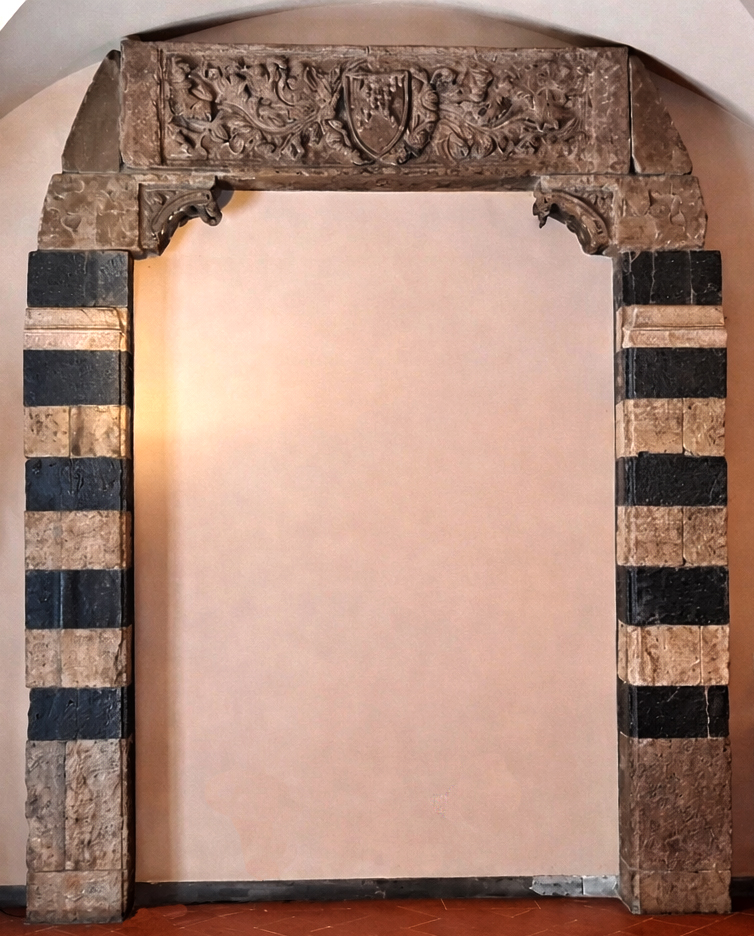
Fioravanti arms on the door of the oratory

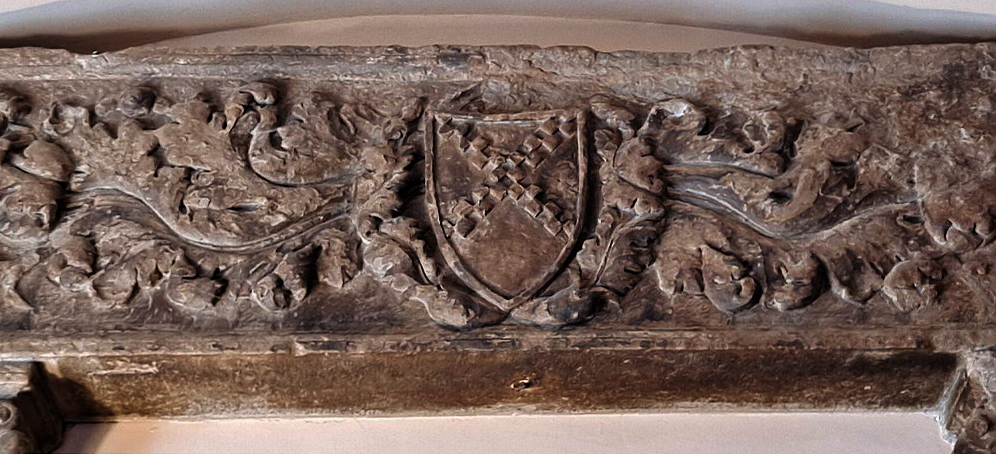
Fioravanti arms on a stone lintel

=== Artistic patronage ===
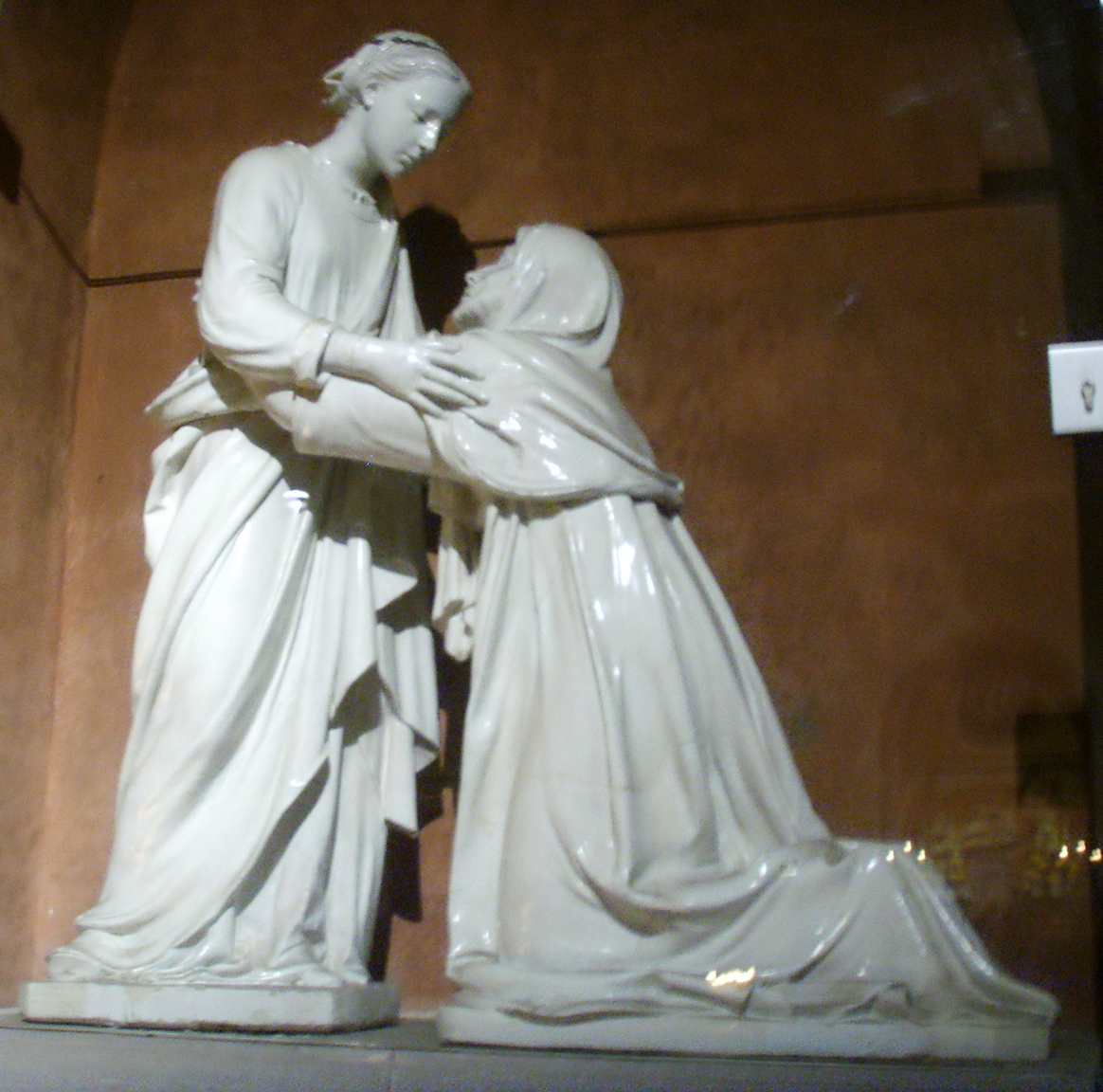
Visitation by Luca della Robbia, commissioned for San Giovanni Fuorcivitas, Pistoia

According to Giorgio Vasari, in his Le Vite de' più eccellenti pittori, scultori e architettori, the Fioravanti family were patrons of the painter Lorenzo Monaco. Vasari records that Lorenzo Monaco painted the Fioravanti Chapel in the church of San Pier Maggiore in Florence, a structure demolished in the late 18th century.

=== Leonardo da Vinci and the Fioravanti family ===
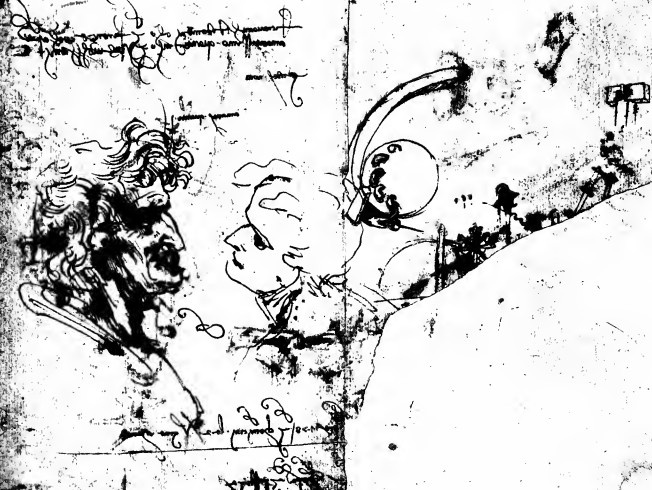
Drawing attributed to Leonardo da Vinci with an inscription referring to Fieravanti, son of Domenico. circa 1478.

A drawing attributed to Leonardo da Vinci contains an inscription referring to a member of the Fioravanti family. The note, written in Leonardo's hand, has been transcribed as:

"Fieravanti di Domenico in Firenze e che aparve amantissimo quanto mi e una vergine che io ami"

The passage has been translated approximately as: "Fioravanti, son of Domenico, in Florence, who appeared most affectionate toward me, as a maiden whom I love."

The drawing depicts two male heads, one youthful and one older, and has attracted scholarly interest because of the unusual wording of the inscription. Some interpretations regard the phrase una vergine che io ami ("a virgin whom I love") as an example of Leonardo's symbolic or allegorical language. In this reading, the "virgin" represents an idealized concept—such as purity, nature, knowledge, or artistic perfection—rather than a literal individual. The expression has therefore been interpreted as reflecting themes that recur throughout Leonardo's notebooks, including intellectual inquiry, artistic devotion, and the pursuit of knowledge.

Other scholars have cautioned that the precise meaning of the inscription remains uncertain and that interpretations of Leonardo's symbolic language are necessarily speculative.

=== Jacopo Fioravanti ===
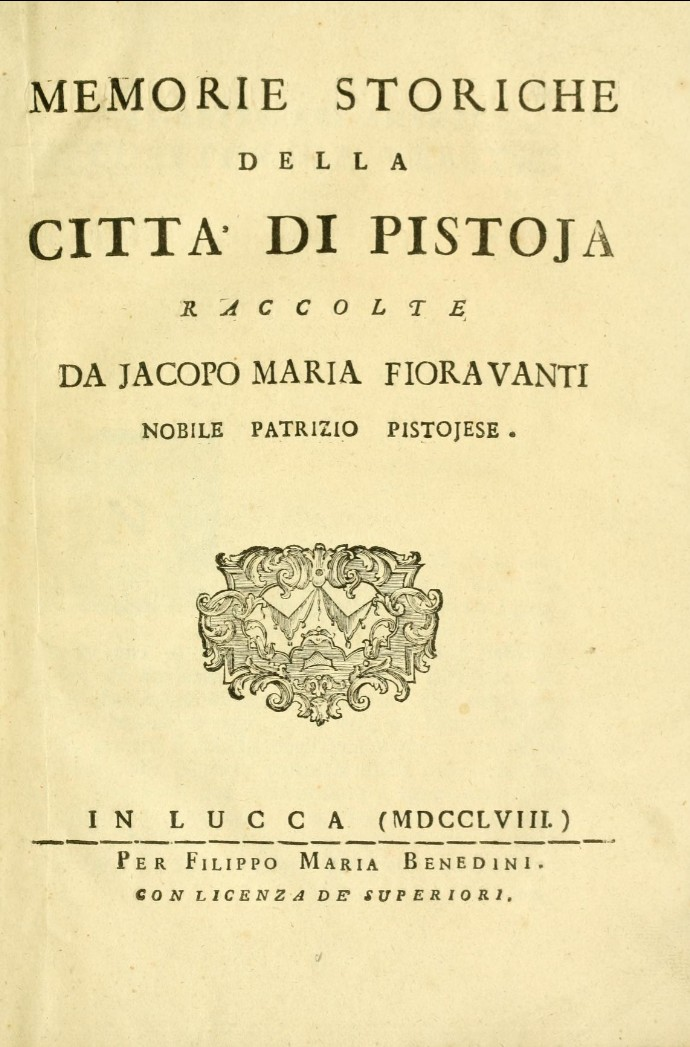
Title page of Jacopo Fioravanti's Memorie storiche della città di Pistoja, 1758

Jacopo Fioravanti was the author of Memorie storiche della città di Pistoja, published in 1758. John Adams later used Fioravanti’s historical account in A Defence of the Constitutions of Government of the United States of America to illustrate the dangers of political factionalism, specifically referencing the civil wars in Pistoia.

== Heraldry ==
Tuscan heraldic sources record two principal forms of the coat of arms associated with the Fioravanti family. The most common and widely attested form features a chequered saltire. A second form, differing in field arrangement, is also documented. Additional renderings survive in architectural contexts in Tuscany and reflect local stylistic interpretation rather than distinct heraldic grants.

Recorded forms and architectural renderings of the Fioravanti arms

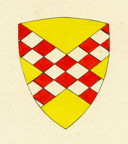
Chequered saltire form

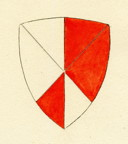
Alternate recorded form

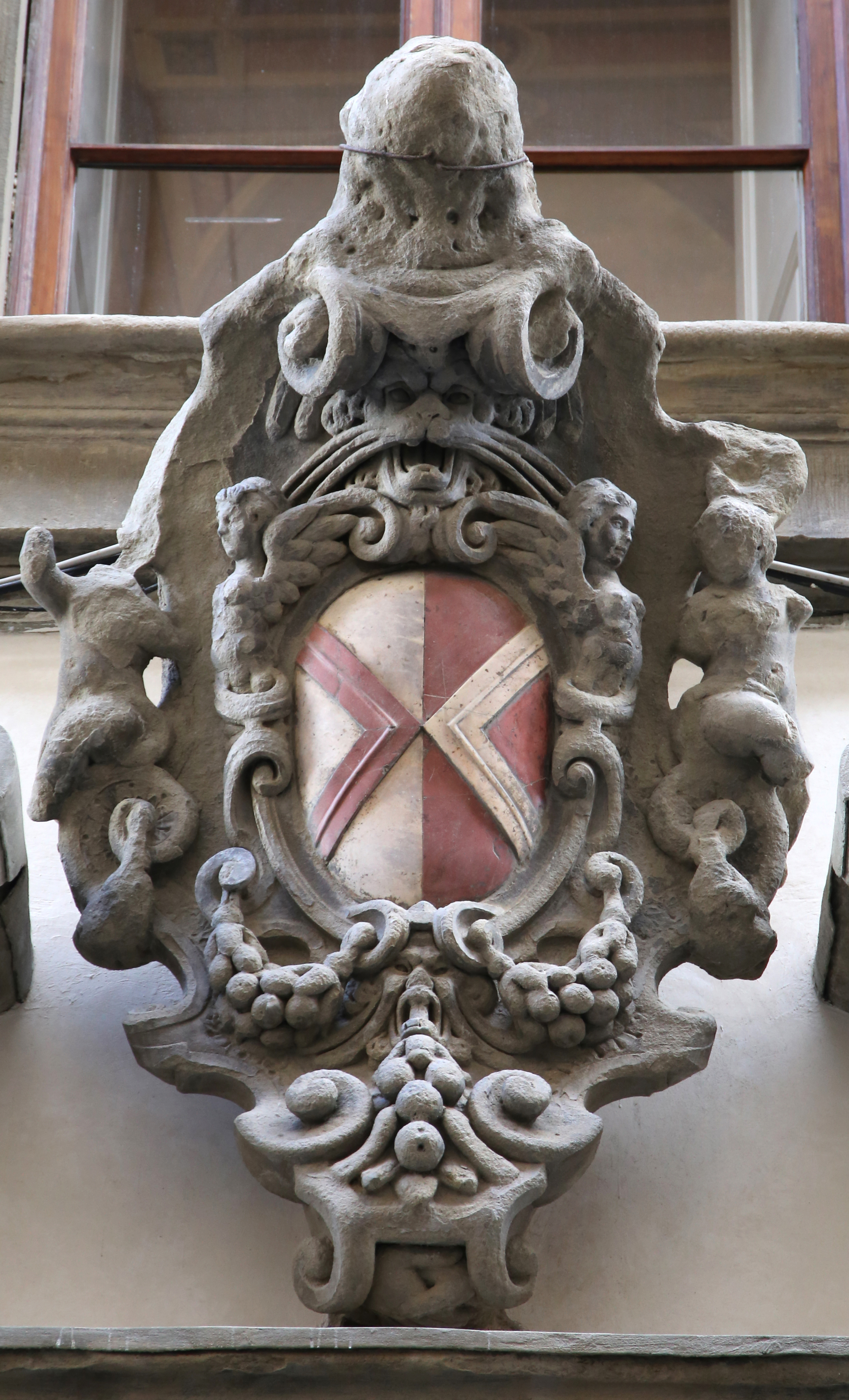
Architectural rendering on Palazzo Fioravanti, Florence
