= Palazzo Ganucci Cancellieri =

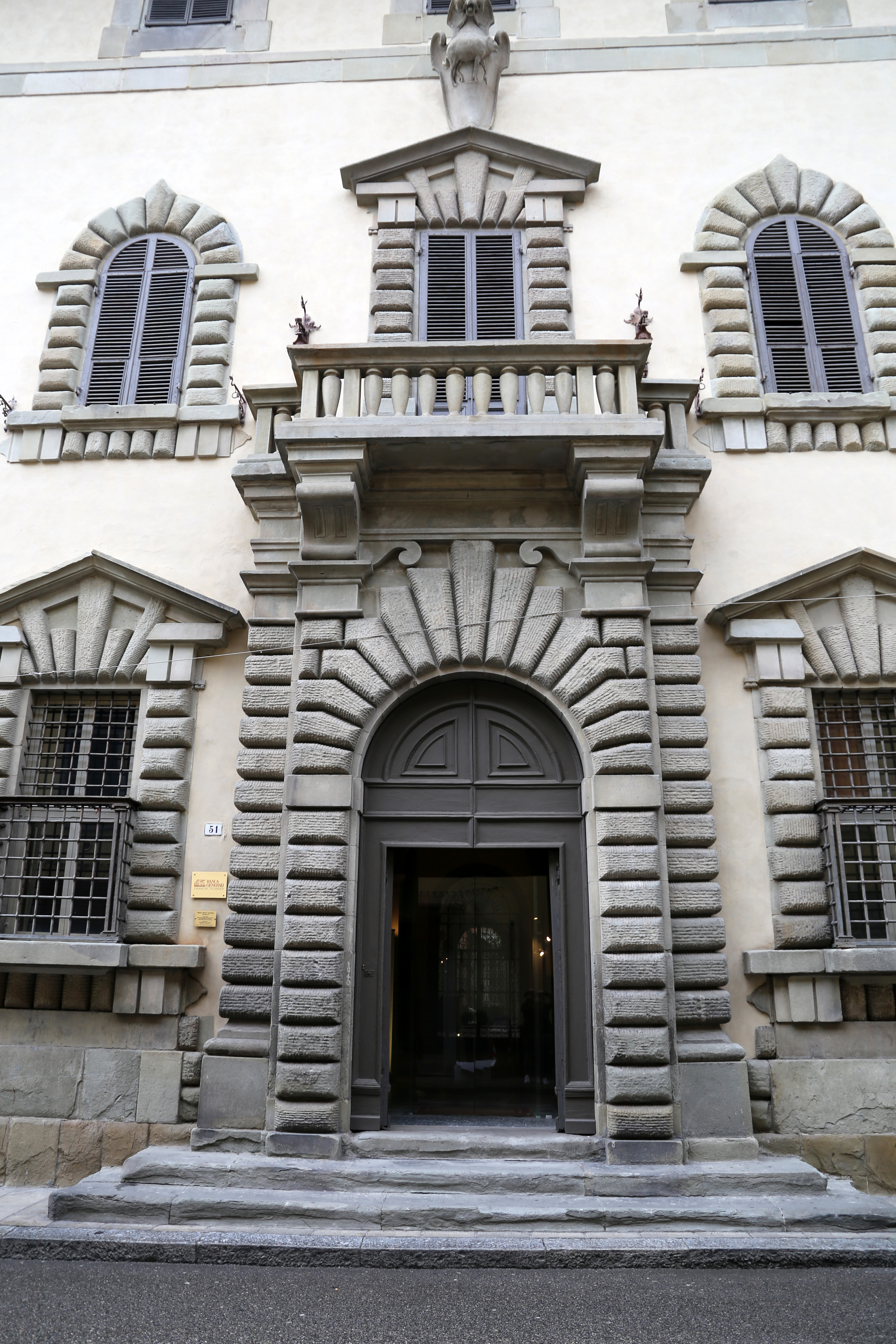
Portal with coat of arms

The Palazzo Ganucci Cancellieri is a late-Mannerist-style palace located at Via Curtatone e Montanara #51 in central Pistoia, Tuscany, Italy.

== Description ==
In 1609, the place at the site came into the possession of the prominent Cancellieri family; they refurbished it under the designs (circa 1615) of Jacopo Lafri. In 1795, the palace was inherited by Giacinto Ganucci. A the coat of arms of the Cancellieri family (1598) sits awkwardly atop the doorway into the small balcony, the top entrance portal in the center of the facade; it was moved here from the family's former home (Palazzo delle Cancellieri Bianchi) on the west flank of Piazza Bartolomeo.
