= Formicola =

- Comune
- Comune di Formicola
- Location within Italy Location within Campania
- Coordinates: 41°13′N 14°14′E
- Country: Italy
- Region: Campania
- Province: Caserta (CE)

Government
  - Mayor: Michele Scirocco

Area
  - Total: 17.4 km^{2} (6.7 sq mi)
- Elevation: 192 m (630 ft)

Population (28 February 2017)
  - Total: 1,467
  - Density: 84.3/km^{2} (218/sq mi)
- Demonym: Formicolani
- Time zone: UTC+1 (CET)
  - Summer (DST): UTC+2 (CEST)
- Postal code: 81040
- Dialing code: 0823
- Website: Official website

Formicola (Campanian: Furmìcola or Frummìcola) is a comune (municipality) in the Province of Caserta in Campania, Italy. Formicola is located about 45 kilometres (28 mi) north of Naples and about 20 kilometres (12 mi) northwest of Caserta. It borders the municipalities of Camigliano, Giano Vetusto, Pietramelara, Pontelatone, Roccaromana, and Rocchetta e Croce.
