= Liberi =

- Comune
- Comune di Liberi
- Location within Italy Location within Campania
- Coordinates: 41°13′N 14°17′E
- Country: Italy
- Region: Campania
- Province: Caserta (CE)

Government
  - Mayor: Antonio Diana

Area
  - Total: 17.4 km^{2} (6.7 sq mi)
- Elevation: 470 m (1,540 ft)

Population (31 March 2017)
  - Total: 1,150
  - Density: 66.1/km^{2} (171/sq mi)
- Demonym: Liberini
- Time zone: UTC+1 (CET)
  - Summer (DST): UTC+2 (CEST)
- Postal code: 81040
- Dialing code: 0823
- Website: Official website

Liberi is a comune (municipality) in the Province of Caserta in the Italian region Campania, located about 45 kilometres (28 mi) north of Naples and about 15 kilometres (9 mi) north of Caserta.

Liberi borders the following municipalities: Alvignano, Caiazzo, Castel di Sasso, Dragoni, Pontelatone, Roccaromana.
