= Dragoni =

- Comune
- Comune di Dragoni
- Location within Italy Location within Campania
- Coordinates: 41°16′N 14°18′E
- Country: Italy
- Region: Campania
- Province: Caserta (CE)
- Frazioni: Maiorano di Monte

Government
  - Mayor: Silvio Lavornia

Area
  - Total: 25.9 km^{2} (10.0 sq mi)
- Elevation: 130 m (430 ft)

Population (31 December 2010)
  - Total: 2,154
  - Density: 83.2/km^{2} (215/sq mi)
- Demonym: Dragonesi
- Time zone: UTC+1 (CET)
  - Summer (DST): UTC+2 (CEST)
- Postal code: 81010
- Dialing code: 0823

Dragoni is a comune (municipality) in the Province of Caserta in the Italian region Campania, located about 50 kilometres (31 mi) north of Naples and about 20 kilometres (12 mi) north of Caserta.

Dragoni borders the following municipalities: Alife, Alvignano, Baia e Latina, Liberi, Roccaromana.
