= Pietramelara =

- Comune
- Comune di Pietramelara
- Location within Italy Location within Campania
- Coordinates: 41°16′N 14°11′E
- Country: Italy
- Region: Campania
- Province: Caserta (CE)

Government
  - Mayor: Pasquale Di Fruscio

Area
  - Total: 23.9 km^{2} (9.2 sq mi)
- Elevation: 132 m (433 ft)

Population (31 March 2017)
  - Total: 4,693
  - Density: 196/km^{2} (509/sq mi)
- Demonym: Pietramelaresi
- Time zone: UTC+1 (CET)
  - Summer (DST): UTC+2 (CEST)
- Postal code: 81051
- Dialing code: 0823
- Website: Official website

Pietramelara is a comune (municipality) in the Province of Caserta in the Italian region Campania, located about 50 kilometres (31 mi) north of Naples and about 25 kilometres (16 mi) northwest of Caserta. It occupies the plain just south of the slopes of Monte Maggiore, the highest peak in the Monti Trebulani.

Pietramelara borders the following municipalities: Formicola, Pietravairano, Riardo, Roccaromana, Rocchetta e Croce.
