= Casapulla =

- Comune
- Comune di Casapulla
- Location within Italy Location within Campania
- Coordinates: 41°4′N 14°17′E
- Country: Italy
- Region: Campania
- Province: Caserta (CE)

Government
  - Mayor: Commissar

Area
  - Total: 2.9 km^{2} (1.1 sq mi)
- Elevation: 46 m (151 ft)

Population (31 May 2017)
  - Total: 8,683
  - Density: 3,000/km^{2} (7,800/sq mi)
- Demonym: Casapullesi
- Time zone: UTC+1 (CET)
  - Summer (DST): UTC+2 (CEST)
- Postal code: 81020
- Dialing code: 0823
- Patron saint: St. Elpidius
- Website: Official website

Casapulla (Campanian: Casapùllë) is a comune (municipality) in the Province of Caserta in the Italian region Campania, located about 4 kilometres (2 mi) west of Caserta.

Casapulla borders the municipalities of Casagiove, Curti, Macerata Campania, Recale, and San Prisco.
