= Baia e Latina =

- Comune
- Comune di Baia e Latina
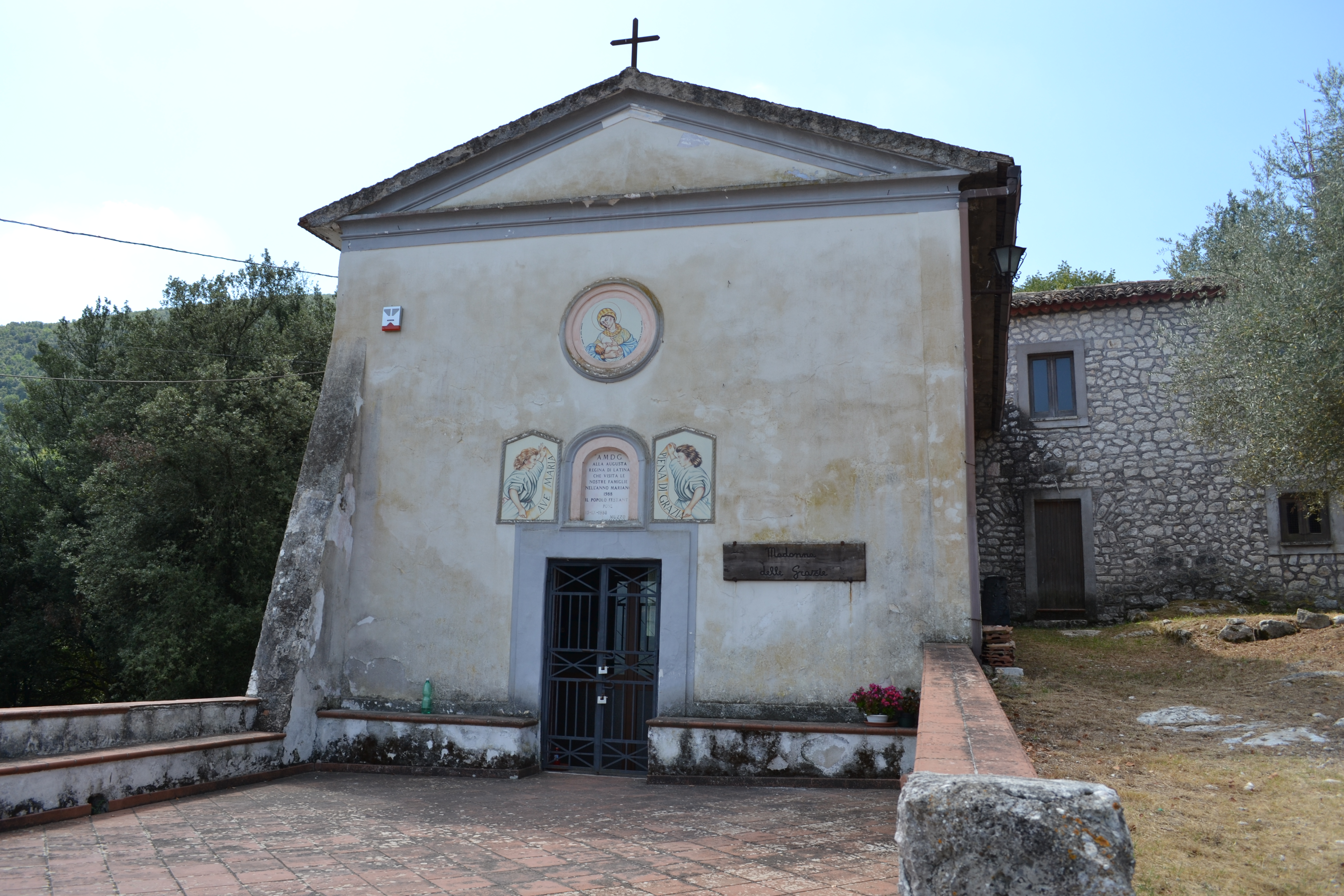
- Church of Madonna delle Grazie.

- Location within Italy Location within Campania
- Coordinates: 41°18′N 14°15′E
- Country: Italy
- Region: Campania
- Province: Caserta (CE)
- Frazioni: Latina, Contra

Government
  - Mayor: Giuseppe Di Cerbo

Area
  - Total: 24.5 km^{2} (9.5 sq mi)
- Elevation: 123 m (404 ft)

Population (31 December 2021)
  - Total: 2,036
  - Density: 83.1/km^{2} (215/sq mi)
- Demonym(s): Baiardi and Latinesi
- Time zone: UTC+1 (CET)
  - Summer (DST): UTC+2 (CEST)
- Postal code: 81010
- Dialing code: 0823
- Website: Official website

Baia e Latina is a comune (municipality) in the Province of Caserta in the Italian region Campania, located about 50 kilometres (31 mi) north of Naples and about 25 kilometres (16 mi) northwest of Caserta.

The town hall is located in the locality called Baia, Latina is a former hamlet now part of the inhabited center; therefore it is not a scattered municipality.

Baia Latina borders the following municipalities: Alife, Dragoni, Pietravairano, Roccaromana, Sant'Angelo d'Alife. It was once formed by two separate settlements, Baia and Latina, but over time the two merged.

== History ==
The origins of Baia Latina are uncertain and, historically, its name appears in 979 in the bull of Santo Stefano di Caiazzo.According to Marciano Rossi, the ancient (Baia) was an Etruscan colony, a hypothesis perhaps confirmed by the discovery of amphorae, depicted in the Latin Goddess. Latina was, on the other hand, a colony because of the Vayardis settled there.

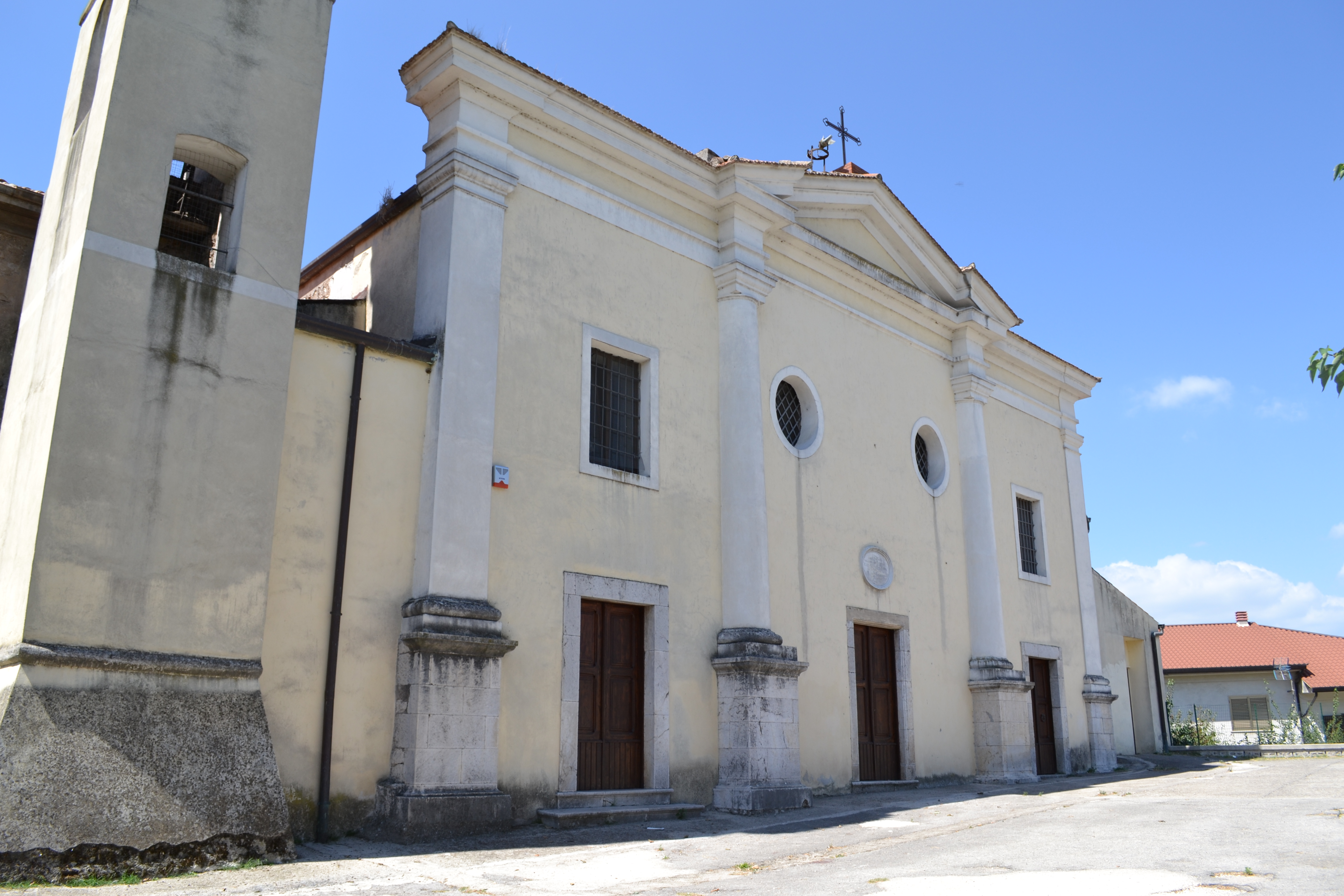
Chiesa di San Vito Martire

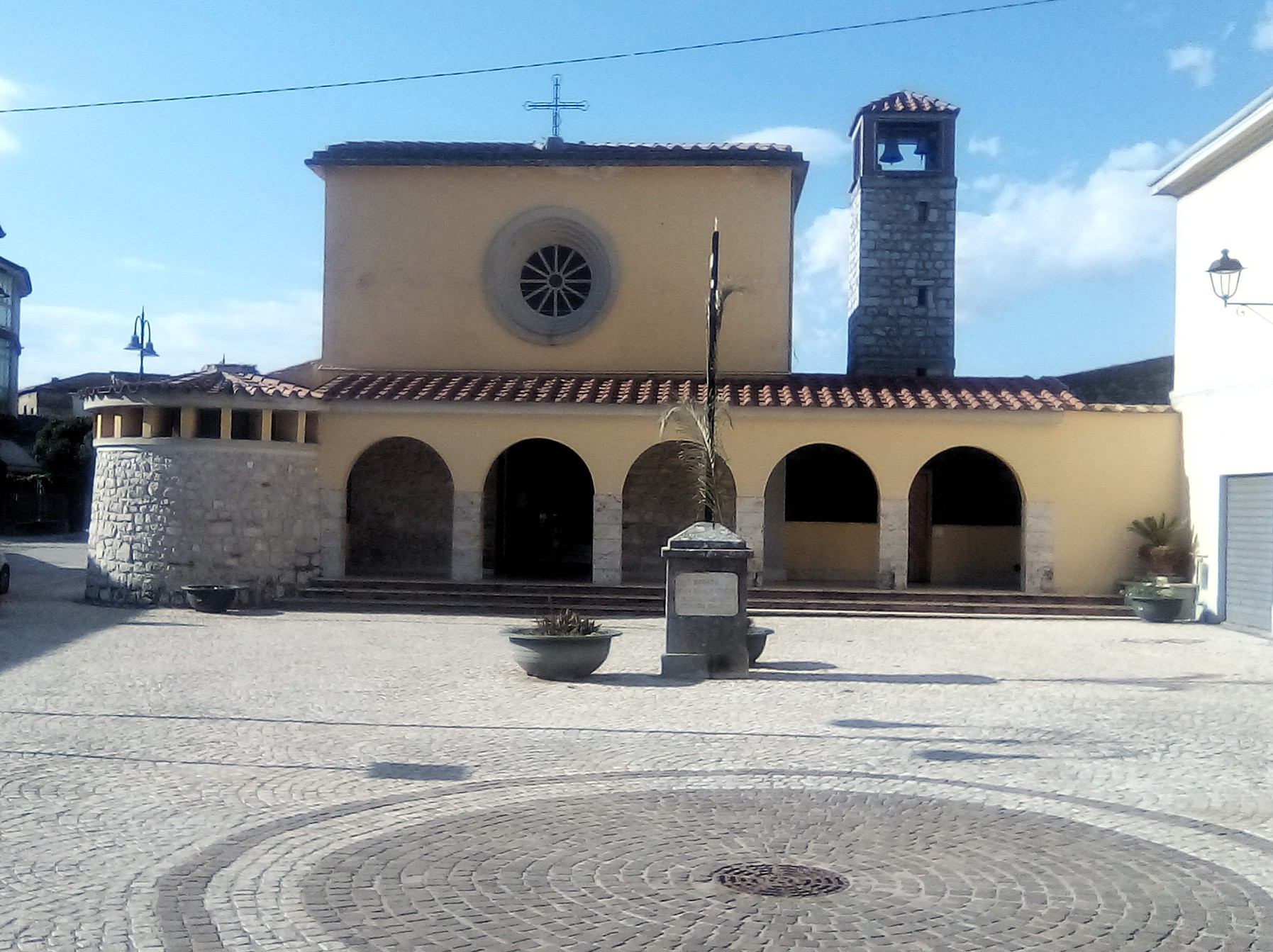
Chiesa di Santo Stefano

== Monuments and places of interest ==
- Church of San Vito martire: of eighteenth-century origin, it has undergone numerous restorations over the years that have progressively distorted its original appearance.
- Church of Santo Stefano: the church has a modern structure built at the end of 1900.
- Scotti Palace
- Church of the Madonna delle Grazie
- Church of San Lorenzo
- Church of the Annunciation: the church overlooks the SP 289 and is easily recognizable by the monumental access staircase and by its apparently simple appearance.
- Church of Santa Maria Assunta
- Ponte dell'Inferno (or dell'Oloferne) Roman bridge of the Via Latina, over the Volturno river
- Medieval village with Norman castle and towers

== Economy ==
The economy is based on agriculture (cereals, fodder, vegetables, grapes), on breeding (mainly cattle and buffaloes) with the production of milk and derivatives. In the area the Terre del Volturno wines are produced in the white, red and rosé varieties.

== Demographic evolution ==
Historical population

Year	Pop.	±%
1861	1,794	—
1871	1,839	+2.5%
1881	1,904	+3.5%
1901	2,442	+28.3%
1911	2,131	−12.7%
1921	2,023	−5.1%

Year	Pop.	±%
1931	2,026	+0.1%
1936	2,132	+5.2%
1951	2,335	+9.5%
1961	2,329	−0.3%
1971	2,046	−12.2%
1981	2,097	+2.5%

Year	Pop.	±%
1991	2,269	+8.2%
2001	2,275	+0.3%
2011	2,251	−1.1%
2021	2,036	−9.6%

Source: Data from ISTAT

=== Foreign ethnicities and minorities ===
As of December 31, 2022 foreigners residents in the municipality were 90. The largest groups are shown below:

1. India 52
2. Romania 19
3. Morocco 10

== Bibliography ==
- Dante B. Marocco (1986). Tipografia Laurenziana (ed.). Guida del Medio Volturno (in Italian). Napoli.
- Pietro Boccia (1999). "Il fenomeno emigratorio in un paese del Sud: Baia e Latina". In Zanichelli (ed.). Socializzazione e controllo sociale (in Italian). Bologna.
