= Camigliano =

- Comune
- Comune di Camigliano
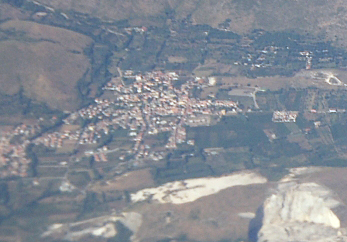

- Location within Italy Location within Campania
- Coordinates: 41°11′N 14°13′E
- Country: Italy
- Region: Campania
- Province: Caserta (CE)
- Frazioni: Leporano

Government
  - Mayor: Giovanni Borzacchiello

Area
  - Total: 6.02 km^{2} (2.32 sq mi)
- Elevation: 80 m (260 ft)

Population (30 April 2017)
  - Total: 1,962
  - Density: 326/km^{2} (844/sq mi)
- Demonym: Camiglianesi
- Time zone: UTC+1 (CET)
  - Summer (DST): UTC+2 (CEST)
- Postal code: 81050
- Dialing code: 0823
- Website: Official website

Camigliano is a comune (municipality) in the Province of Caserta in the Italian region Campania, located about 40 kilometres (25 mi) north of Naples and about 15 kilometres (9 mi) northwest of Caserta.

Camigliano borders the following municipalities: Bellona, Formicola, Giano Vetusto, Pastorano, Pontelatone, Vitulazio. The mayor of Camigliano is Vincenzo Cenname, elected in 2011.
