= Piana di Monte Verna =

- Comune
- Comune di Piana di Monte Verna
- Location within Italy Location within Campania
- Coordinates: 41°10′N 14°20′E
- Country: Italy
- Region: Campania
- Province: Caserta (CE)

Government
  - Mayor: Giustino Castellano

Area
  - Total: 23.5 km^{2} (9.1 sq mi)
- Elevation: 80 m (260 ft)

Population (31 March 2018)
  - Total: 2,314
  - Density: 98.5/km^{2} (255/sq mi)
- Demonym: Pianesi
- Time zone: UTC+1 (CET)
  - Summer (DST): UTC+2 (CEST)
- Postal code: 81015
- Dialing code: 0823
- Website: Official website

Piana di Monte Verna is a comune (municipality) in the Province of Caserta in the Italian region Campania, located about 40 kilometres (25 mi) north of Naples and about 11 kilometres (7 mi) north of Caserta.

Piana di Monte Verna borders the following municipalities: Caiazzo, Capua, Castel di Sasso, Castel Morrone, Limatola.
