= Pastorano =

- Comune
- Comune di Pastorano
- Location within Italy Location within Campania
- Coordinates: 41°11′N 14°12′E
- Country: Italy
- Region: Campania
- Province: Caserta (CE)
- Frazioni: Pantuliano, San Secondino, Torre Lupara

Government
  - Mayor: Vincenzo Russo

Area
  - Total: 13.8 km^{2} (5.3 sq mi)
- Elevation: 67 m (220 ft)

Population (30 November 2015)
  - Total: 3,030
  - Density: 220/km^{2} (569/sq mi)
- Demonym: Pastoranesi
- Time zone: UTC+1 (CET)
  - Summer (DST): UTC+2 (CEST)
- Postal code: 81050
- Dialing code: 0823

Pastorano is a comune (municipality) in the Province of Caserta in the Italian region Campania, located about 40 kilometres (25 mi) north of Naples and about 15 kilometres (9 mi) northwest of Caserta. Pastorano borders the following municipalities: Camigliano, Giano Vetusto, Pignataro Maggiore, Vitulazio.

The Treaty of Casalanza was signed here in 1815 between the Austrian and Neapolitan armies, after the latter's king, Joachim Murat, had been defeated in the Battle of Tolentino.
