= San Prisco =

- Comune
- Comune di San Prisco
- Location within Italy Location within Campania
- Coordinates: 41°5′N 14°17′E
- Country: Italy
- Region: Campania
- Province: Caserta (CE)

Government
  - Mayor: Domenico D'Angelo

Area
  - Total: 7.79 km^{2} (3.01 sq mi)
- Elevation: 48 m (157 ft)

Population (31 March 2016)
  - Total: 12,363
  - Density: 1,590/km^{2} (4,110/sq mi)
- Demonym: Sanprischesi
- Time zone: UTC+1 (CET)
  - Summer (DST): UTC+2 (CEST)
- Postal code: 81054
- Dialing code: 0823
- Website: Official website

San Prisco is a comune (municipality) in the Province of Caserta in the Italian region Campania, located about 30 kilometres (19 mi) north of Naples and about 5 kilometres (3 mi) northwest of Caserta.

San Prisco borders the following municipalities: Capua, Casagiove, Casapulla, Caserta, Curti, Santa Maria Capua Vetere.

== See also ==
- Priscus (saint)
