= Rocchetta e Croce =

- Comune
- Comune di Rocchetta e Croce
- Location within Italy Location within Campania
- Coordinates: 41°14′N 14°9′E
- Country: Italy
- Region: Campania
- Province: Caserta (CE)
- Frazioni: Valdassano

Government
  - Mayor: Salvatore Geremia

Area
  - Total: 12.9 km^{2} (5.0 sq mi)
- Elevation: 459 m (1,506 ft)

Population (30 June 2016)
  - Total: 463
  - Density: 35.9/km^{2} (93.0/sq mi)
- Demonym: Rocchettani
- Time zone: UTC+1 (CET)
  - Summer (DST): UTC+2 (CEST)
- Postal code: 81042
- Dialing code: 0823
- Website: Official website

Rocchetta e Croce is a comune (municipality) in the Province of Caserta in the Italian region Campania, located about 45 kilometres (28 mi) north of Naples and about 25 kilometres (16 mi) northwest of Caserta.

Rocchetta e Croce borders the following municipalities: Calvi Risorta, Formicola, Giano Vetusto, Pietramelara, Riardo, Teano.
