= Castel di Sasso =

- Comune
- Comune di Castel di Sasso
- Location within Italy Location within Campania
- Coordinates: 41°11′N 14°17′E
- Country: Italy
- Region: Campania
- Province: Caserta (CE)

Government
  - Mayor: Antonio D'Avino

Area
  - Total: 20.3 km^{2} (7.8 sq mi)
- Elevation: 200 m (660 ft)

Population (31 March 2017)
  - Total: 1,148
  - Density: 56.6/km^{2} (146/sq mi)
- Demonym: Sassesi
- Time zone: UTC+1 (CET)
  - Summer (DST): UTC+2 (CEST)
- Postal code: 81040
- Dialing code: 0823
- Patron saint: St. Blaise
- Saint day: 3 February
- Website: Official website

Castel di Sasso is a comune (municipality) in the Province of Caserta in the Italian region Campania, located about 40 kilometres (25 mi) north of Naples and about 14 kilometres (9 mi) northwest of Caserta.

Castel di Sasso borders the following municipalities: Caiazzo, Capua, Liberi, Piana di Monte Verna, Pontelatone.
