= Riardo =

- Comune
- Comune di Riardo
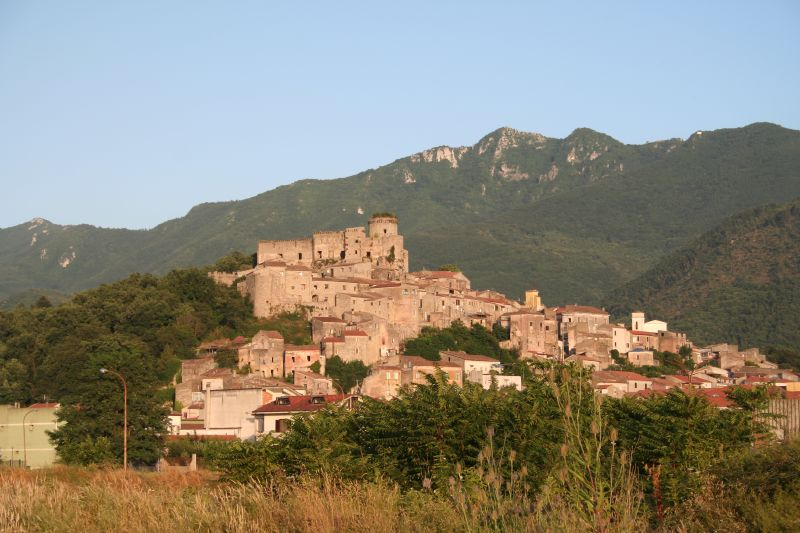

- Location within Italy Location within Campania
- Coordinates: 41°16′N 14°9′E
- Country: Italy
- Region: Campania
- Province: Caserta (CE)

Government
  - Mayor: Armando Fusco

Area
  - Total: 16.48 km^{2} (6.36 sq mi)
- Elevation: 192 m (630 ft)

Population (16 June 2017)
  - Total: 2,200
  - Density: 130/km^{2} (350/sq mi)
- Demonym: Riardesi
- Time zone: UTC+1 (CET)
  - Summer (DST): UTC+2 (CEST)
- Postal code: 81053
- Dialing code: 0823
- Website: Official website

Riardo is a comune (municipality) in the Province of Caserta in the Italian region Campania, located about 50 kilometres (31 mi) north of Naples and about 25 kilometres (16 mi) northwest of Caserta.

Riardo borders the following municipalities: Pietramelara, Pietravairano, Rocchetta e Croce, Teano, Vairano Patenora.

== Economy ==
The communal territory houses the sources of Ferrarelle and Santagata commercial mineral waters.
