= Trebula =

Trebula may refer to:

- Trebula Mutusca, an ancient Sabine town, modern Monteleone Sabino, Province of Rieti, Lazio
- Trebula Suffenas, an ancient Sabine town, location unknown
- Trebula Balliensis, modern Treglia, in the comune of Pontelatone, Province of Caserta, Campania
