= Pontelatone =

- Comune
- Comune di Pontelatone
- Location within Italy Location within Campania
- Coordinates: 41°12′N 14°15′E
- Country: Italy
- Region: Campania
- Province: Caserta (CE)

Government
  - Mayor: Adriana Esperti

Area
  - Total: 30.4 km^{2} (11.7 sq mi)
- Elevation: 120 m (390 ft)

Population (31 December 2010)
  - Total: 1,819
  - Density: 59.8/km^{2} (155/sq mi)
- Demonym: Latonesi
- Time zone: UTC+1 (CET)
  - Summer (DST): UTC+2 (CEST)
- Postal code: 81050
- Dialing code: 0823
- Website: Official website

Pontelatone is a comune (municipality) in the Province of Caserta in the Italian region Campania, located about 40 kilometres (25 mi) north of Naples and about 15 kilometres (9 mi) northwest of Caserta. The località Treglia (also spelled Tregghia), within the Pontelatone communal territory, is the site of ancient city of Trebula.

Pontelatone borders the following municipalities: Bellona, Camigliano, Capua, Castel di Sasso, Formicola, Liberi, Roccaromana.
