= Giano =

Giano may refer to:

- Giano dell'Umbria, a comune in Umbria, central Italy
- Giano Vetusto, a comune in Campania, southern Italy
- The Italian name of the ancient god Janus (mythology)
  - The Italian name of Saturn's moon Janus (moon)
