= Vitulazio =

- Comune
- Comune di Vitulazio
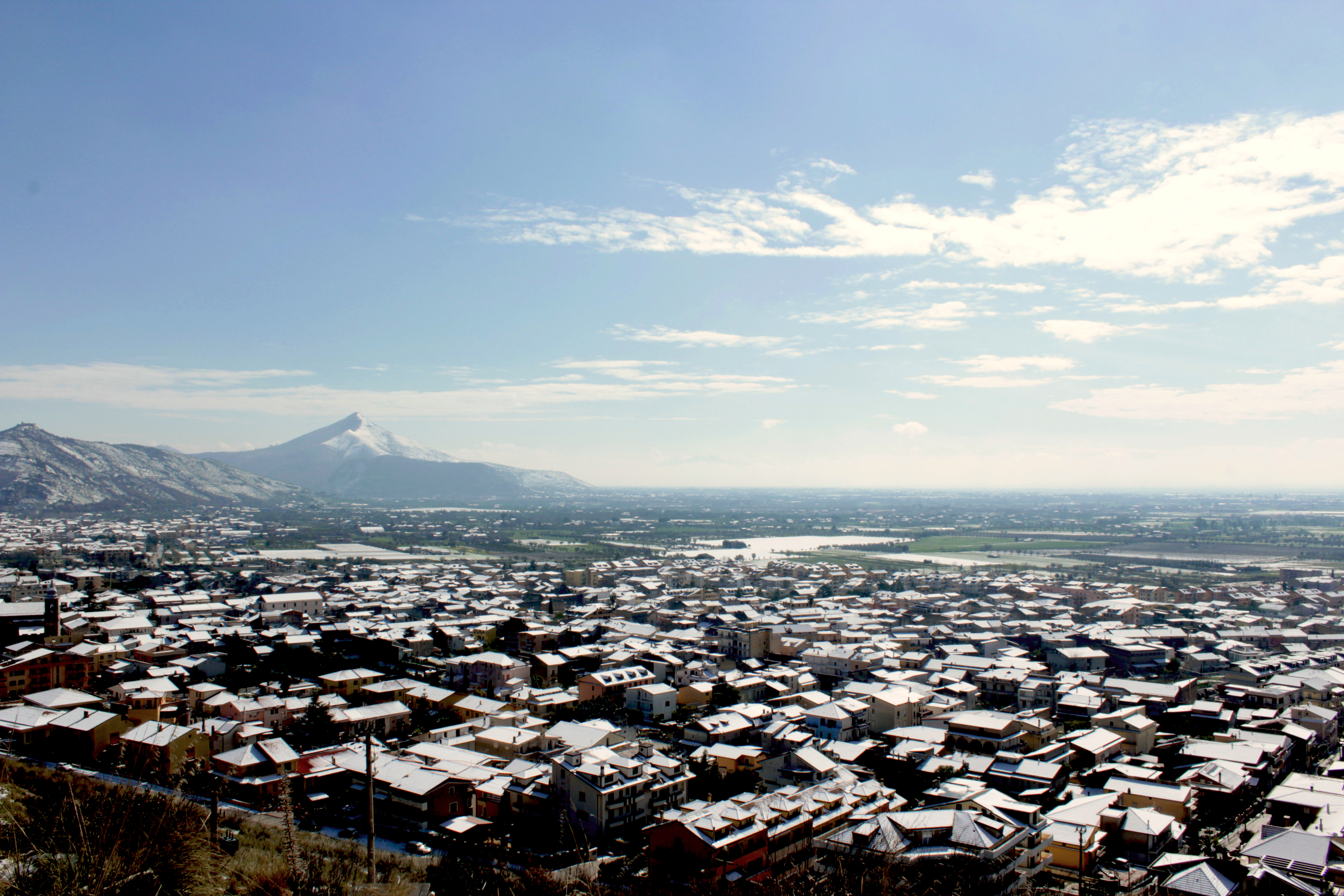
- Extraordinary snowfall of 27-2-2018 on the town of Vitulazio (CE)

- Location within Italy Location within Campania
- Coordinates: 41°10′N 14°13′E
- Country: Italy
- Region: Campania
- Province: Caserta (CE)

Government
  - Mayor: commissar

Area
  - Total: 22.7 km^{2} (8.8 sq mi)

Population (1 January 2013)
  - Total: 7,139
  - Density: 314/km^{2} (815/sq mi)
- Demonym: Vitulatini
- Time zone: UTC+1 (CET)
  - Summer (DST): UTC+2 (CEST)
- Postal code: 81041, 81050
- Dialing code: 0823
- Website: Official website

Vitulazio is a comune (municipality) in the Province of Caserta in the Italian region Campania, located about 35 kilometres (22 mi) north of Naples and about 15 kilometres (9 mi) northwest of Caserta.

Vitulazio borders the following municipalities: Bellona, Camigliano, Capua, Grazzanise, Pastorano, Pignataro Maggiore.
