= Monti Trebulani =

Mountain range in Italy

- Colli Caprensi
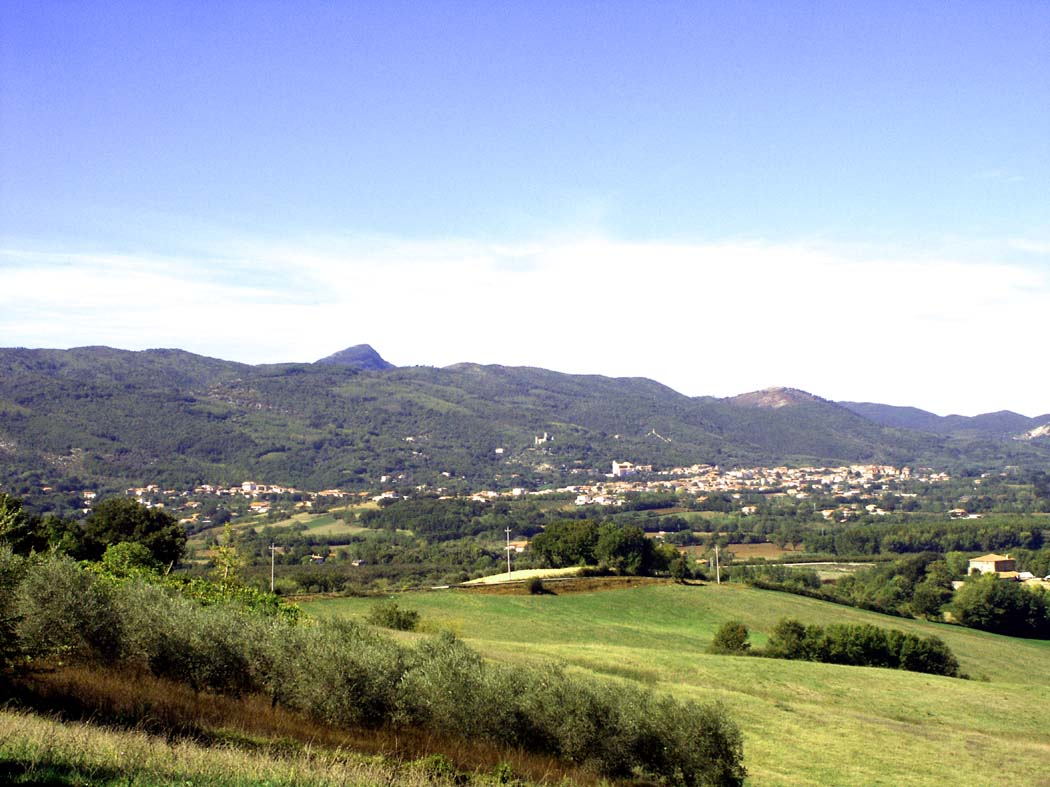

Highest point
- Peak: Monte Maggiore
- Elevation: 1,036 m (3,399 ft)
- Coordinates: 41°11′N 14°16′E

Geography
- Country: Italy
- Region: Campania
- District: Caserta
- Range coordinates: 41°11′N 14°16′E
- Parent range: Apennine Mountains

Geology
- Orogeny: Southern Apenninic Orogeny

The Monti Trebulani or Colli Caprensi is a mountain range in the province of Caserta, Campania, southern Italy.

They take their name from the ancient city of Trebula Balliensis, a Roman colony founded in the 3rd-2nd century BC, whose remains are in the frazione Treglia of the comune of Pontelatone.

The range has a length of approximately 20 km, from north to south, starting from the territory of Pietravairano to Bellona. The highest peak in the range is Monte Maggiore, at 1,036 metres (3,999 ft).

Sights include the grotto of San Michele, in the comune of Liberi.

== See also ==
- Geography of Italy
