= Castel Morrone =

- Comune
- Comune di Castel Morrone
- Location within Italy Location within Campania
- Coordinates: 41°7′N 14°21′E
- Country: Italy
- Region: Campania
- Province: Caserta (CE)
- Frazioni: Annunziata, Balzi, Casale, Gradillo, Grottole, Largisi, Pianelli, Sant'Andrea, Torone, San Mauro

Government
  - Mayor: Gianfranco Della Valle

Area
  - Total: 25.34 km^{2} (9.78 sq mi)
- Elevation: 251 m (823 ft)

Population (31 March 2017)
  - Total: 3,821
  - Density: 150.8/km^{2} (390.5/sq mi)
- Demonym: Morronesi
- Time zone: UTC+1 (CET)
  - Summer (DST): UTC+2 (CEST)
- Postal code: 81020
- Dialing code: 0823
- Website: Official website

Castel Morrone is a comune (municipality) in the Province of Caserta in the Italian region Campania, located about 35 kilometres (22 mi) north of Naples and about 6 kilometres (4 mi) north of Caserta.

Castel Morrone borders the following municipalities: Caiazzo, Capua, Caserta, Limatola, Piana di Monte Verna.
