= Casertavecchia =

- Frazione
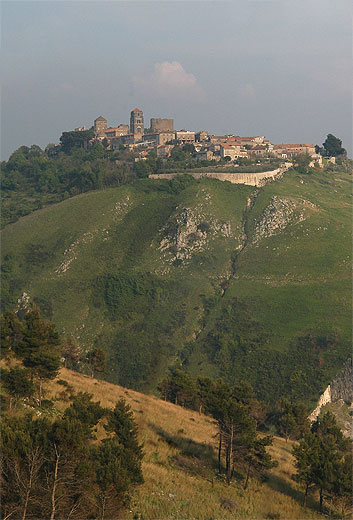
- Landscape

- Location of Casertavecchia in Italy
- Coordinates: 41°05′48″N 14°21′59″E
- Country: Italy
- Region: Campania
- Province: Caserta (CE)
- Comune: Caserta
- Elevation: 401 m (1,316 ft)

Population (2009)
  - Total: 187
- Time zone: UTC+1 (CET)
  - Summer (DST): UTC+2 (CEST)
- Postal code: 81100
- Dialing code: (+39) 0823

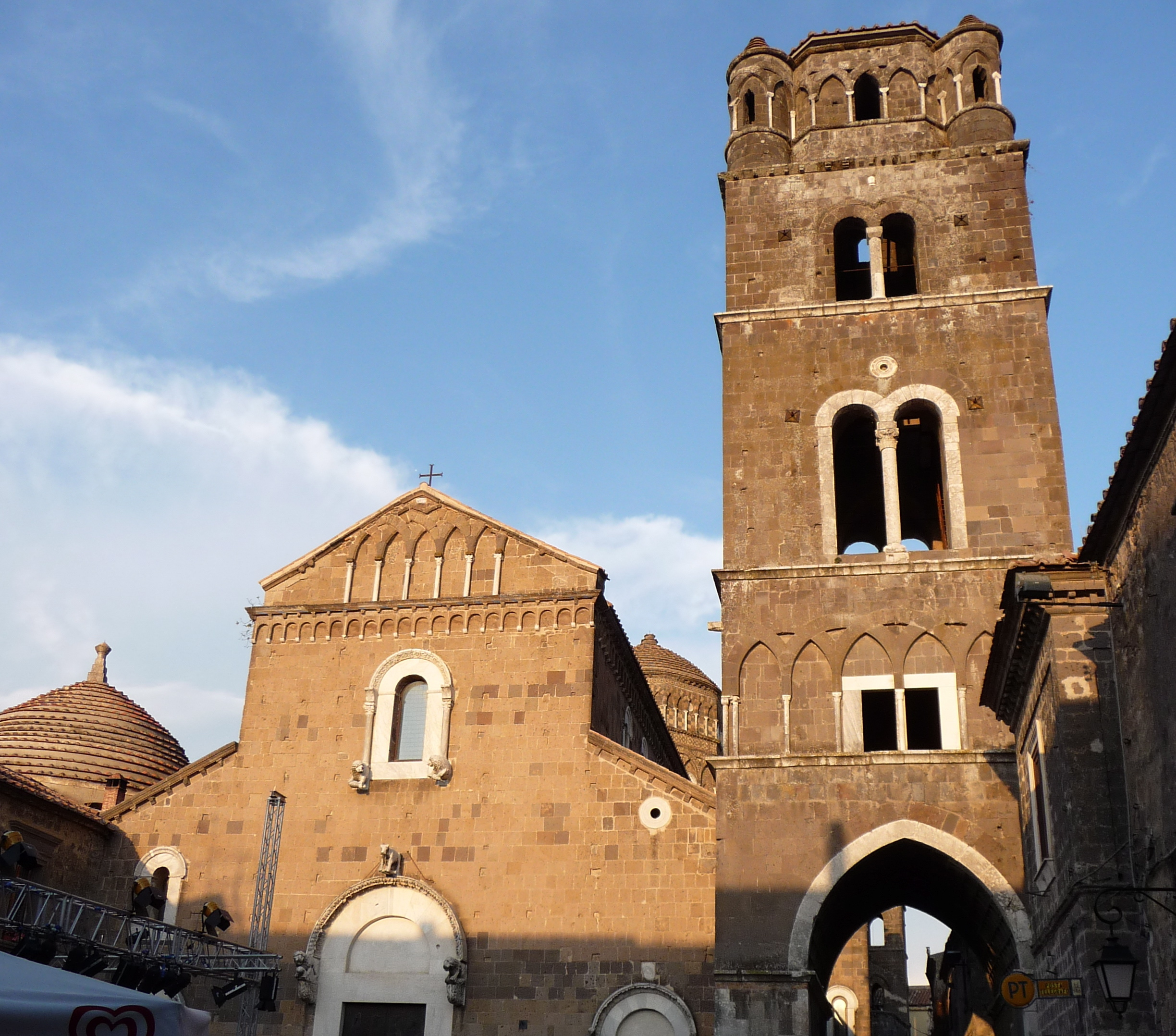
The Cathedral of St. Michael

Casertavecchia is a frazione of Caserta, Italy. It is the site of a former medieval village that lies at the foot of the Tifatini Mountains located 10km north-east of the City of Caserta, at an altitude of approximately 401 meters. Its name, translated from Italian, means "Old Caserta".

== History ==
=== Early history ===
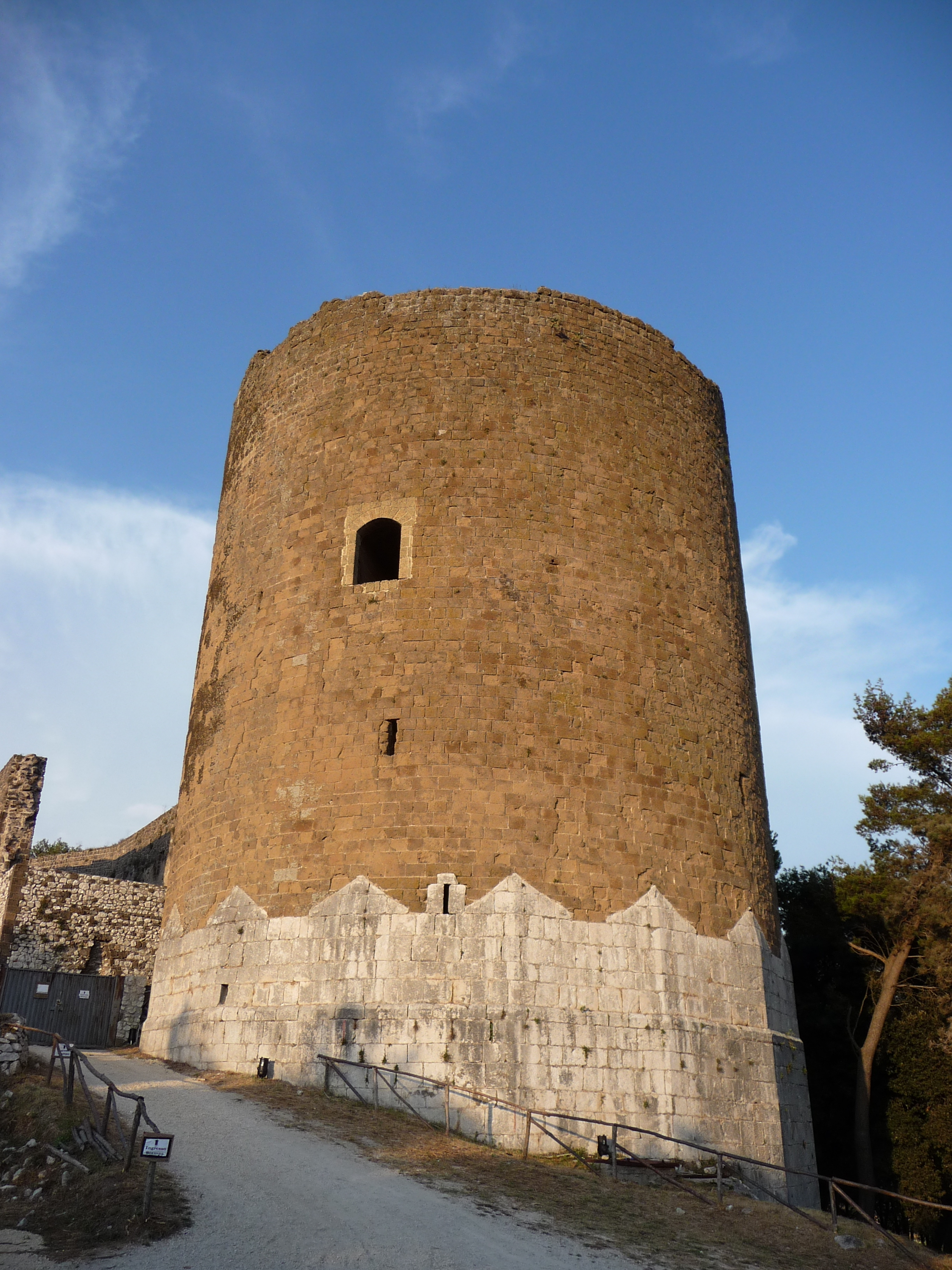
Casertavecchia tower

The origins of Casertavecchia are uncertain, but according to the Benedictine monk, Erchempert, in Ystoriola Langobardorum Beneventi degentium, the village was founded in 861 AD. The previous Roman town was called "Casam Irtam" (from the Latin meaning "home village located above").

The village was initially conquered and ruled by the Lombards. Subsequent Saracen depredations led to the fortified mountain village becoming the Bishopric for the province.

Under Norman domination, the village began the construction of its cathedral, dedicated to St. Michael the Archangel. During this period it was controlled by the Swabian, Riccardo di Lauro (1232–1266), who increased the political power of the town.

The Crown of Aragon conquered the village in 1442 which began its long and gradual decline in importance. Eventually, Casertavecchia would host only the local seminary and the Bishop's seat. Under the rule of the Bourbons, major construction began taking place in the city of Caserta. By 1842 political rule had entirely moved to the great palace in the larger city, with the Casertan diocese finally relocating from Casertavecchia to Caserta.

On October 1, 1860, in the battle of the Volturna, the Neapolitans made one of their last stands of the battle in front of Caserta Vecchia, 400–500 Neapolitan soldiers surrendering to Giuseppe Garibaldi in one of the decisive battles of the Second Italian Independence War.

=== Recent history ===
In 1960, Casertavecchia was designated an Italian National Monument.

Today, the village is primarily a tourist destination. Sites worth visiting consist of the church, its bell tower, and the remains of the original castle. Visitors can dine in local pizzerias with panoramic views of the surrounding countryside.

== Gallery ==
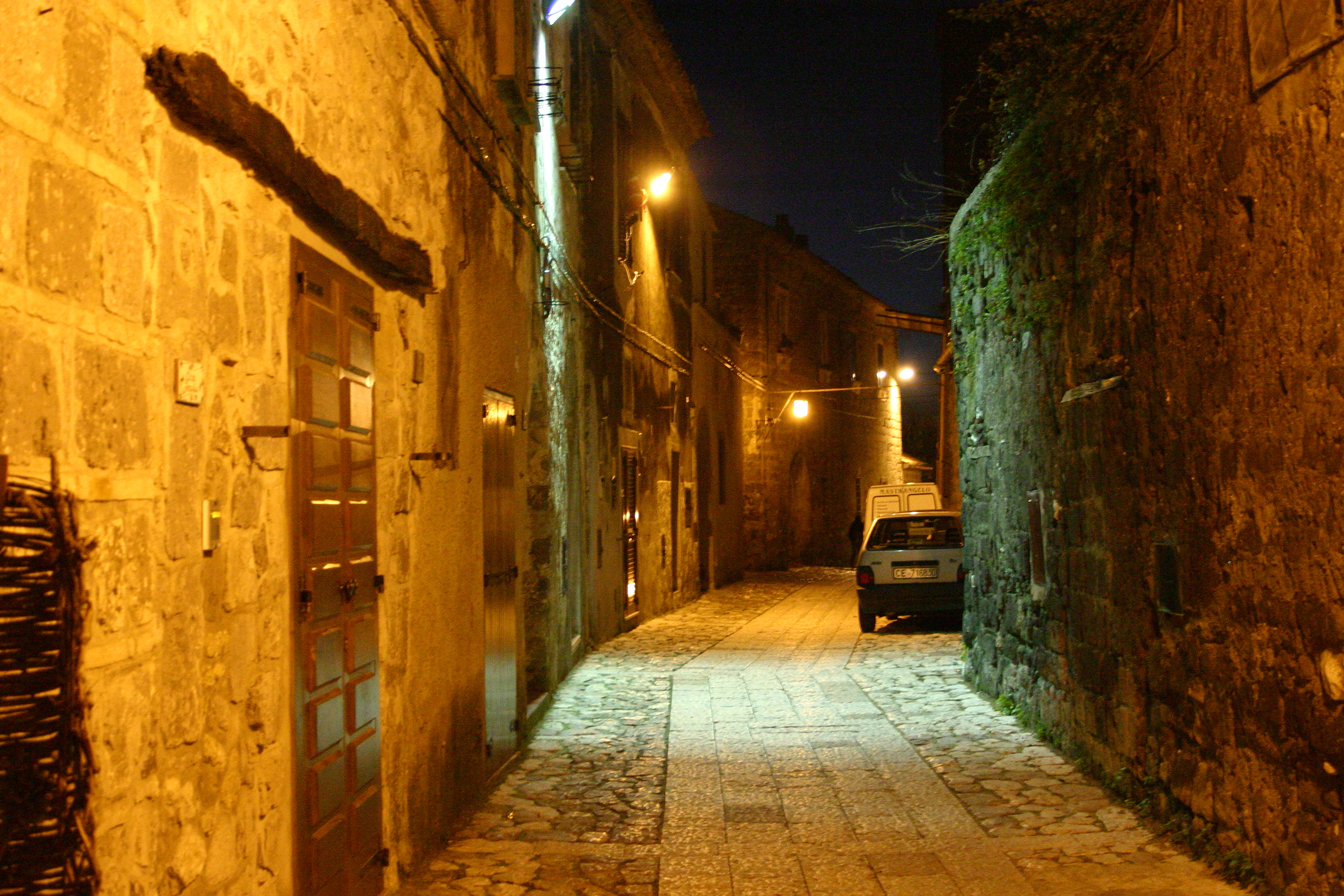
Streets at night

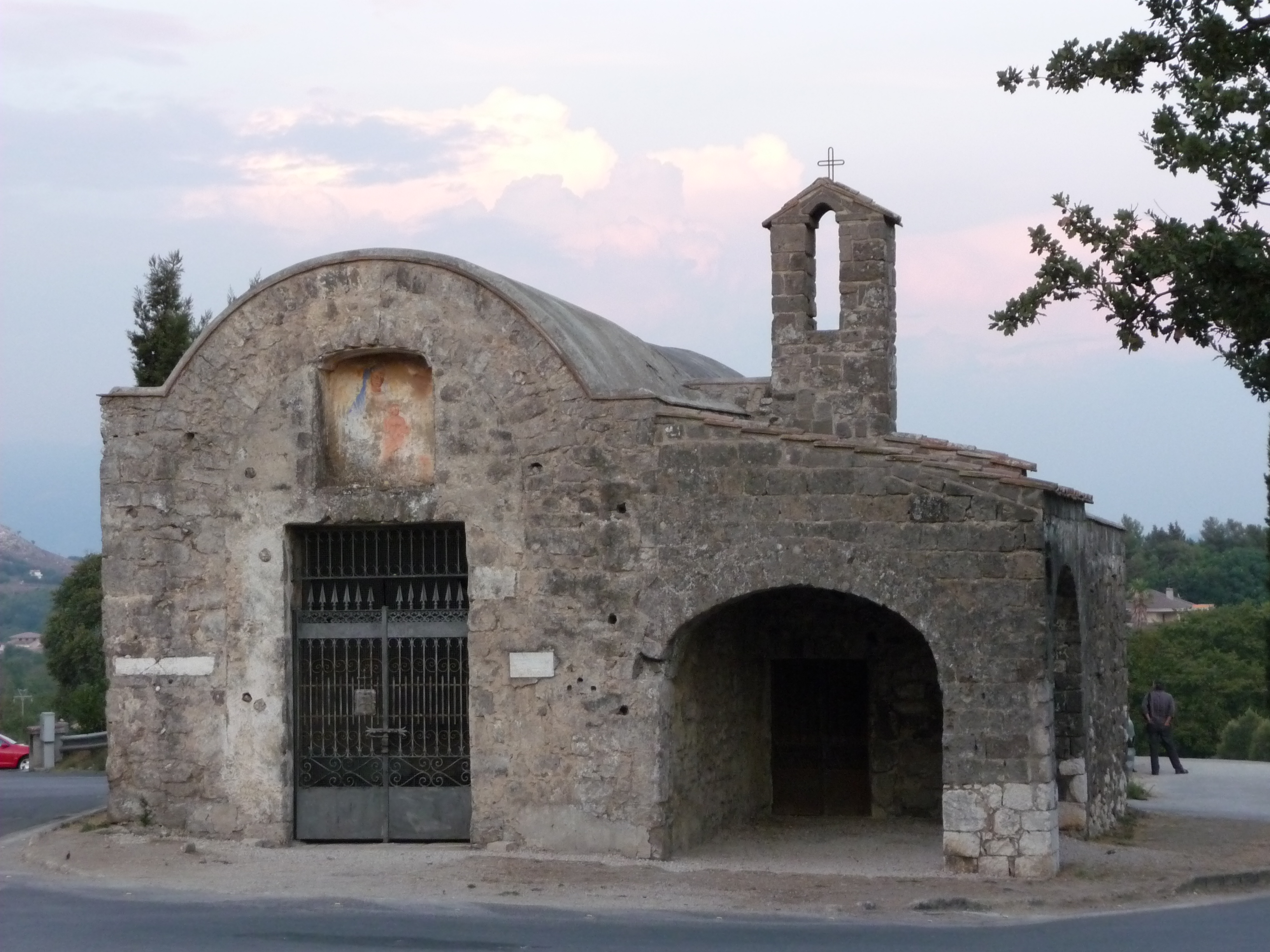
Old church

== See also ==
- San Leucio

== Sources and references ==
- Historia Langabardorvm Beneventarnorvm at The Latin Library
- Historia Langobardorum Beneventanorum at the Institut für Mittelalter Forschung
- Ystoriola Langobardorum Beneventi degentium from the Monumenta Germaniae Historica
