= Trebula Balliensis =

Ancient city of Campania, Italy

Coordinates: 41.228301°N 14.266013°E

- Trebula shown within Campania region and Caserta province
- Type: Settlement
- Location: Pontelatone, Province of Caserta, Italy
- Region: Campania

Site notes
- Management: Soprintendenza per i beni archeologici di Salerno, Avellino e Caserta
- Public access: Yes

Trebula or Trebula Balliensis or Trebula Baliensis (Greek: Τρήβουλα), was an ancient city of Campania, Italy, the location of which is occupied by the modern village of Treglia in the comune of Pontelatone. The Monti Trebulani, a small mountain group in the modern province of Caserta, take their name from it.

It was situated in the district north of the Vulturnus (modern Volturno), in the mountain tract which extends from near Caiatia (modern Caiazzo) to the Via Latina. Pliny terms the citizens Trebulani cognomine Balinienses, probably to distinguish them from those of the two cities of the same name among the Sabines; but the Campanian town seems to have been the most considerable of the three, and is termed simply Trebula by Ptolemy, as well as by Livy.

The first mention of the name occurs in 303 BCE, when we are told that the Trebulani received the Roman franchise at the same time with the Arpinates. There seems no doubt that the Campanian city is here meant: and this is quite certain in regard to the next notice in Livy, where he tells us that the three cities of Compulteria, Trebula, and Saticula, which had revolted to Hannibal, were recovered by Fabius in 215 BCE. The Trebulanus ager is mentioned also by Cicero among the fertile districts of Campania, which Servilius Rullus proposed to distribute among the poorer Roman citizens; and Pliny writes that it was noted for its wines, which had rapidly risen in estimation in his day. The Liber Coloniarum also mentions Trebula among the municipal towns of Campania. It appears to have received a fresh body of settlers under Augustus, but without attaining the rank of a colony.

The site of Trebula, which was erroneously fixed by Cluverius and some local writers to the south of the Vulturnus, appears to be correctly identified by local antiquarians with a place called Treglia or Tregghia, at the foot of the Pizzo San Salvatore, about 10 km north of the Vulturnus and 13 km northeast of Capua. There are said to be considerable ancient remains upon the spot, which together with the resemblance of name would seem clearly to establish the position of the ancient city.
