= Alvignano =

- Comune
- Comune di Alvignano
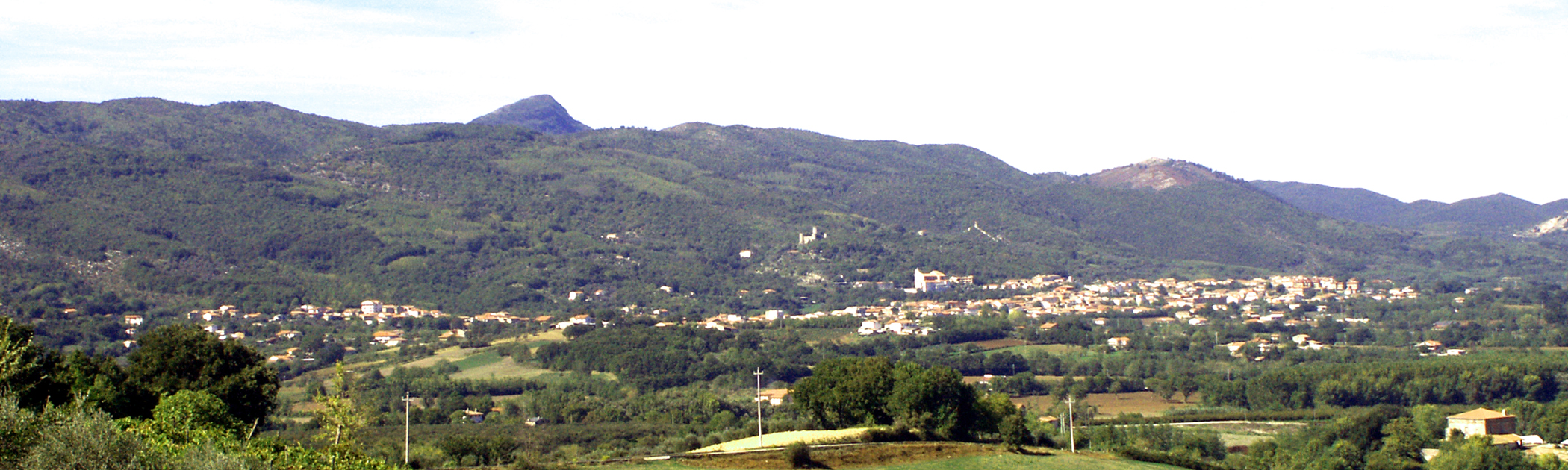
- View of Alvignano

- Flag Coat of arms

- Location of Alvignano in Italy Alvignano (Campania)
- Coordinates: 41°15′N 14°20′E
- Country: Italy
- Region: Campania
- Province: Caserta (CE)
- Frazioni: Angiolilli, Annunziata, Faraoni, Marcianofreddo, Notarpaoli, Petrilli, Piazza, Rasignano, San Mauro, San Nicola

Government
  - Mayor: Angelo Francesco Marcucci

Area
  - Total: 38.13 km^{2} (14.72 sq mi)
- Elevation: 132 m (433 ft)

Population (31 March 2017)
  - Total: 4,746
  - Density: 124.5/km^{2} (322.4/sq mi)
- Demonym: Alvignanesi
- Time zone: UTC+1 (CET)
  - Summer (DST): UTC+2 (CEST)
- Postal code: 81012
- Dialing code: 0823
- Patron saint: St. Ferdinand of Aragon
- Saint day: Second Sunday in July
- Website: Official website

Alvignano is a comune (municipality) in the Province of Caserta in the Italian region Campania, located about 45 kilometres (28 mi) north of Naples and about 25 kilometres (16 mi) north of Caserta, at the foot of the Monti Trebulani.

Its main attractions are the Basilica of Santa Maria di Cubulteria, a rare example of Lombard architecture (8th and 9th centuries) and the Aragonese Castle.

Nearby is the ancient town of Compulteria.
