= Bellona, Campania =

Bellona
- Comune
- Comune di Bellona
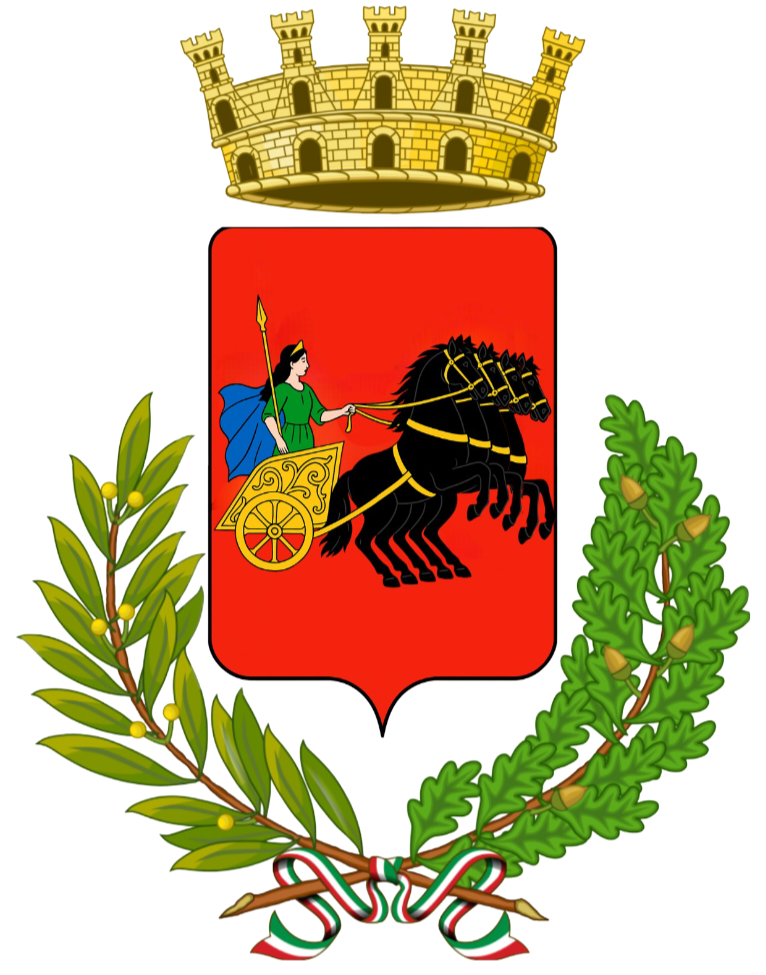
- Coat of arms

- Location within Italy Location within Campania
- Coordinates: 41°10′N 14°14′E
- Country: Italy
- Region: Campania
- Province: Caserta (CE)
- Frazioni: Triflisco

Government
  - Mayor: Filippo Abbate

Area
  - Total: 11.7 km^{2} (4.5 sq mi)
- Elevation: 63 m (207 ft)

Population (28 February 2017)
  - Total: 6,071
  - Density: 519/km^{2} (1,340/sq mi)
- Demonym: Bellonesi
- Time zone: UTC+1 (CET)
  - Summer (DST): UTC+2 (CEST)
- Postal code: 81041
- Dialing code: 0823
- Patron saint: St. Secondinus
- Saint day: First Tuesday after Easter
- Website: Official website

Bellona is a comune (municipality) in the Province of Caserta in the Italian region Campania, located about 35 kilometres (22 mi) north of Naples and about 14 kilometres (9 mi) northwest of Caserta.

Bellona borders the following municipalities: Camigliano, Capua, Pontelatone, Vitulazio.

== History ==
The town takes its name from the Roman goddess Bellona, who had a temple devoted to her in the area. Recent excavations also have shown the likely presence of another temple of Mercury.

When the Saracens destroyed the ancient Capua in 841, some of their inhabitants moved to the Palmobara hill (the modern Bellon's frazione of Triflisco) founding the town of Sicopoli. This was also destroyed by the Saracens in 856. Bellona continued to be a frazione of Capua until the Napoleonic Age (1806).

On 7 October 1943 German soldiers shot 54 of Bellona's citizens. Italian President Oscar Luigi Scalfaro awarded the town the Golden Medal of Military Valour to reward the town's contribution to the Resistance in World War II.
