= Casagiove =

- Comune
- Comune di Casagiove
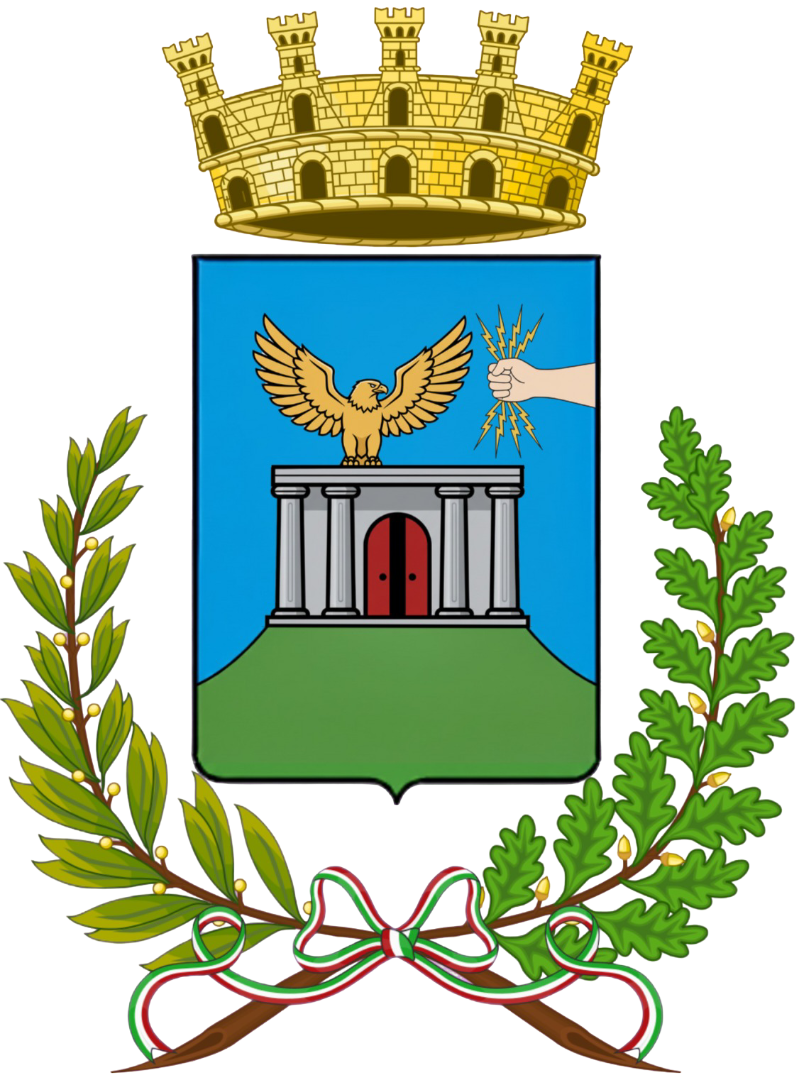
- Coat of arms

- Location within Italy Location within Campania
- Coordinates: 41°4′N 14°18′E
- Country: Italy
- Region: Campania
- Province: Caserta (CE)

Government
  - Mayor: Roberto Corsale

Area
  - Total: 6.36 km^{2} (2.46 sq mi)
- Elevation: 55 m (180 ft)

Population (31 July 2016)
  - Total: 13,610
  - Density: 2,140/km^{2} (5,540/sq mi)
- Demonym: Casagiovesi
- Time zone: UTC+1 (CET)
  - Summer (DST): UTC+2 (CEST)
- Postal code: 81022
- Dialing code: 0823
- Patron saint: Saint Michael
- Saint day: September 29
- Website: Official website

Casagiove is a comune (municipality) in the Province of Caserta in the Italian region Campania, located about 1 kilometre (0.6 mi) west of Caserta.

== History ==
It was built in an area previously colonized by the ancient Greeks. In fact its name means "Jupiter's house", due to its ancient temple dedicated to this divinity. The Appian Way, the Roman road which linked Rome to southern Italy, passed by here. On Casagiove's hill Hannibal, before his failed attempt to invade Rome, stopped for some weeks.

Casagiove housed numerous people who were working for the construction of the Royal Palace of Caserta. Later it became a military quarter. Until the mid-19th century it was divided in two parts: Casanova and Coccagna.

The architect Luigi Vanvitelli is buried in the church of San Francesco di Paola.
