= Curti, Campania =

Curti
- Comune
- Comune di Curti
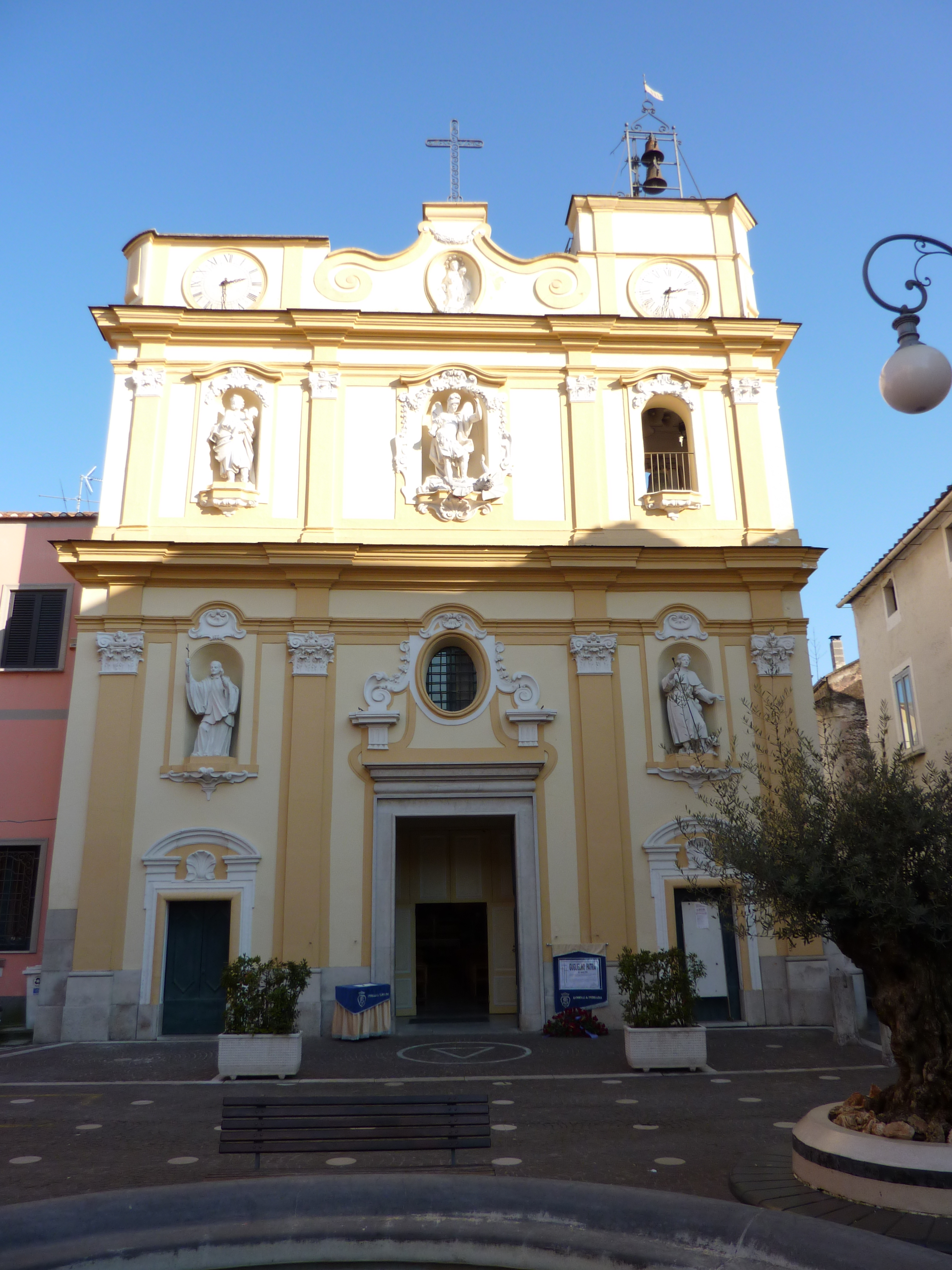
- Church of St. Michael.

- Location within Italy Location within Campania
- Coordinates: 41°5′N 14°16′E
- Country: Italy
- Region: Campania
- Province: Caserta (CE)

Government
  - Mayor: Antonio Raiano

Area
  - Total: 1.73 km^{2} (0.67 sq mi)
- Elevation: 40 m (130 ft)

Population (31 December 2010)
  - Total: 7,234
  - Density: 4,180/km^{2} (10,800/sq mi)
- Demonym: Curtesi
- Time zone: UTC+1 (CET)
  - Summer (DST): UTC+2 (CEST)
- Postal code: 81040
- Dialing code: 0823
- Patron saint: Saint Roch of Montpellier
- Saint day: 3rd Sunday of September
- Website: Official website

Curti (Campanian: Curtë) is a town and comune in the province of Caserta, in the Campania region of southern Italy.

== Main sights ==
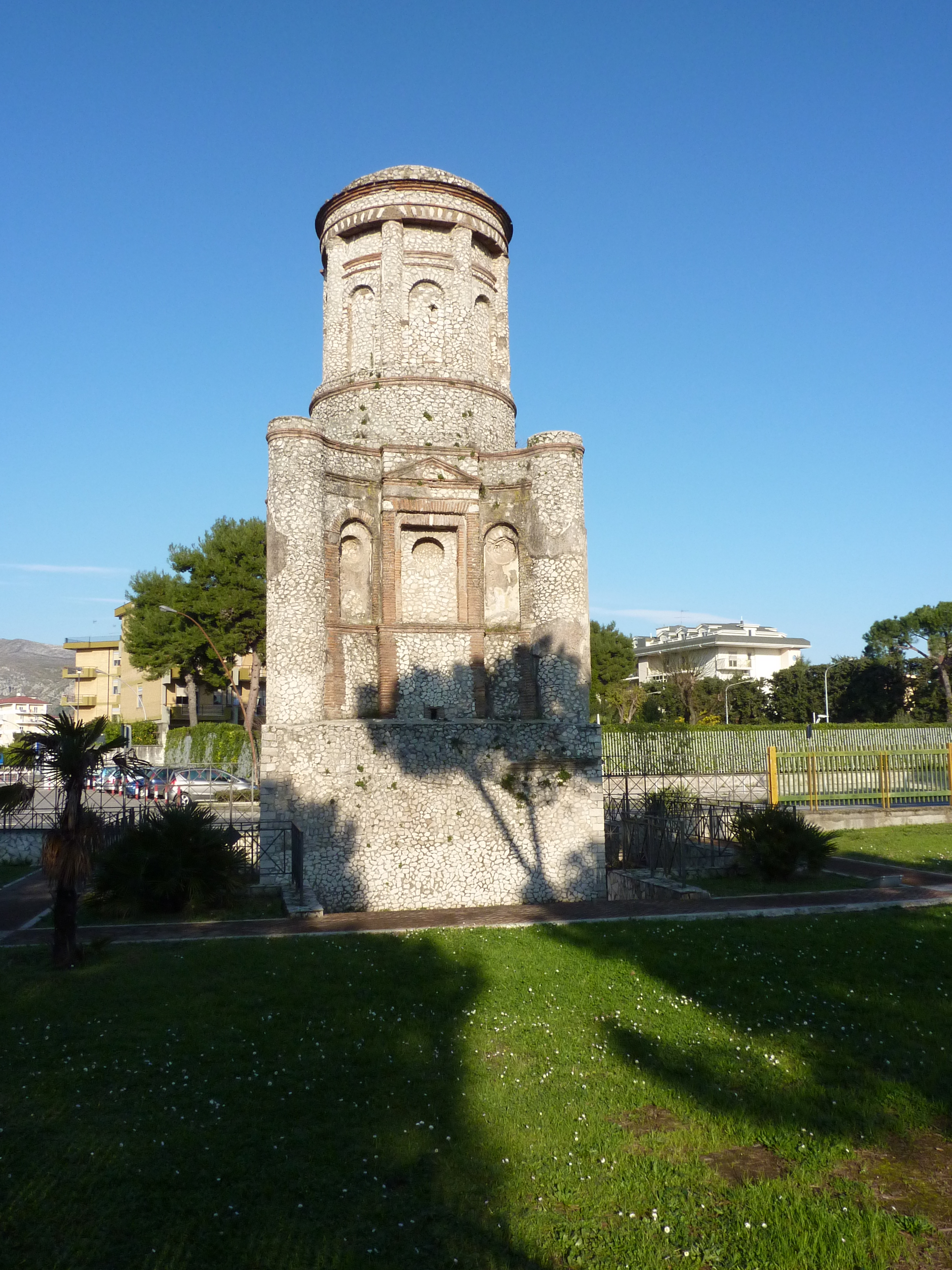
Conocchia monument

The Conocchia is a funerary monument (c. 2nd century AD) that stands on the route of the Appian Way; the name refers to its shape, which resembles a spinner's distaff. According to tradition, Flavia Domitilla was buried there; she was a niece of the Roman emperor Vespasian during the Christian persecution by Domitian.

== Twin towns ==
- Pavel Banya, Bulgaria
- Chiprana, Spain
