= Giano Vetusto =

- Comune
- Giano Vetusto
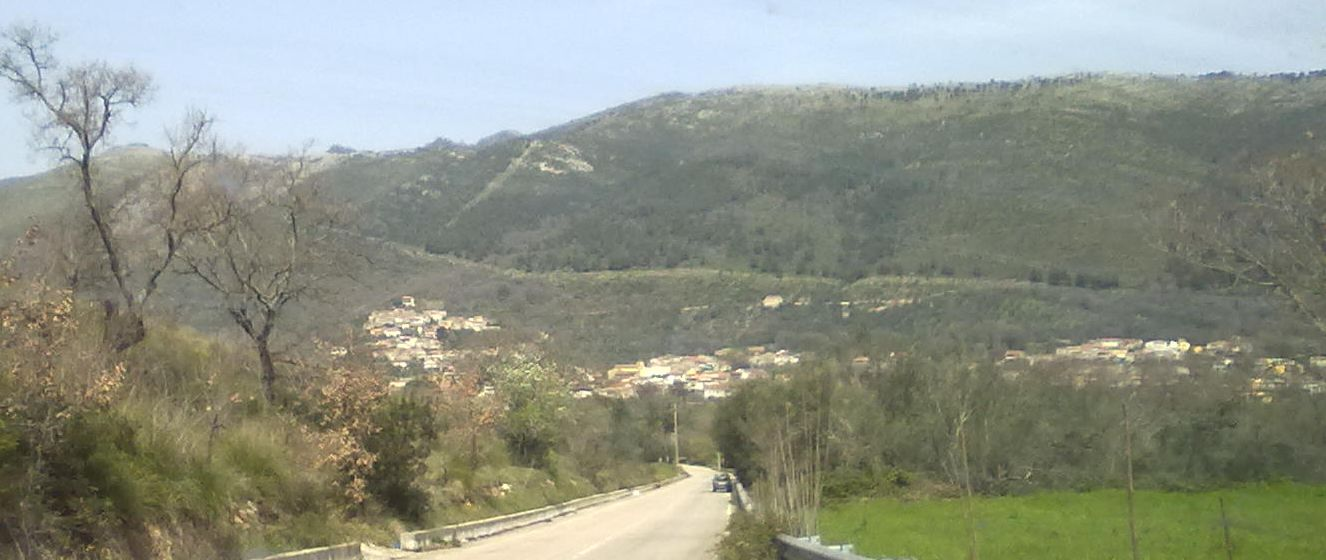

- Location within Italy Location within Campania
- Coordinates: 41°12′N 14°12′E
- Country: Italy
- Region: Campania
- Province: Caserta (CE)
- Frazioni: Curti, Pozzillo

Government
  - Mayor: Antonio Zona

Area
  - Total: 11.5 km^{2} (4.4 sq mi)
- Elevation: 225 m (738 ft)

Population (31 August 2017)
  - Total: 638
  - Density: 55.5/km^{2} (144/sq mi)
- Demonym: Gianesi
- Time zone: UTC+1 (CET)
  - Summer (DST): UTC+2 (CEST)
- Postal code: 81042
- Dialing code: 0823
- Patron saint: St. Anthony
- Saint day: June 13. Festival during 3rd weekend in August
- Website: Official website

Giano Vetusto is a comune (municipality) in the Province of Caserta in the Italian region Campania, located about 40 kilometres (25 mi) north of Naples and about 20 kilometres (12 mi) northwest of Caserta.

Giano's Fractions are: Pozzillo, Fontana, Fontanella, Villa and Curti. Rocciano also used to be a fraction of Giano Vetusto, but it's no longer inhabited. The names is probably connected to the presence of ancient temple of Ianus in the area.

== Notable people ==
- Dominick Pezzulo, PAPD officer who died during the September 11 attacks
