= Caiazzo =

- Comune
- Comune di Caiazzo
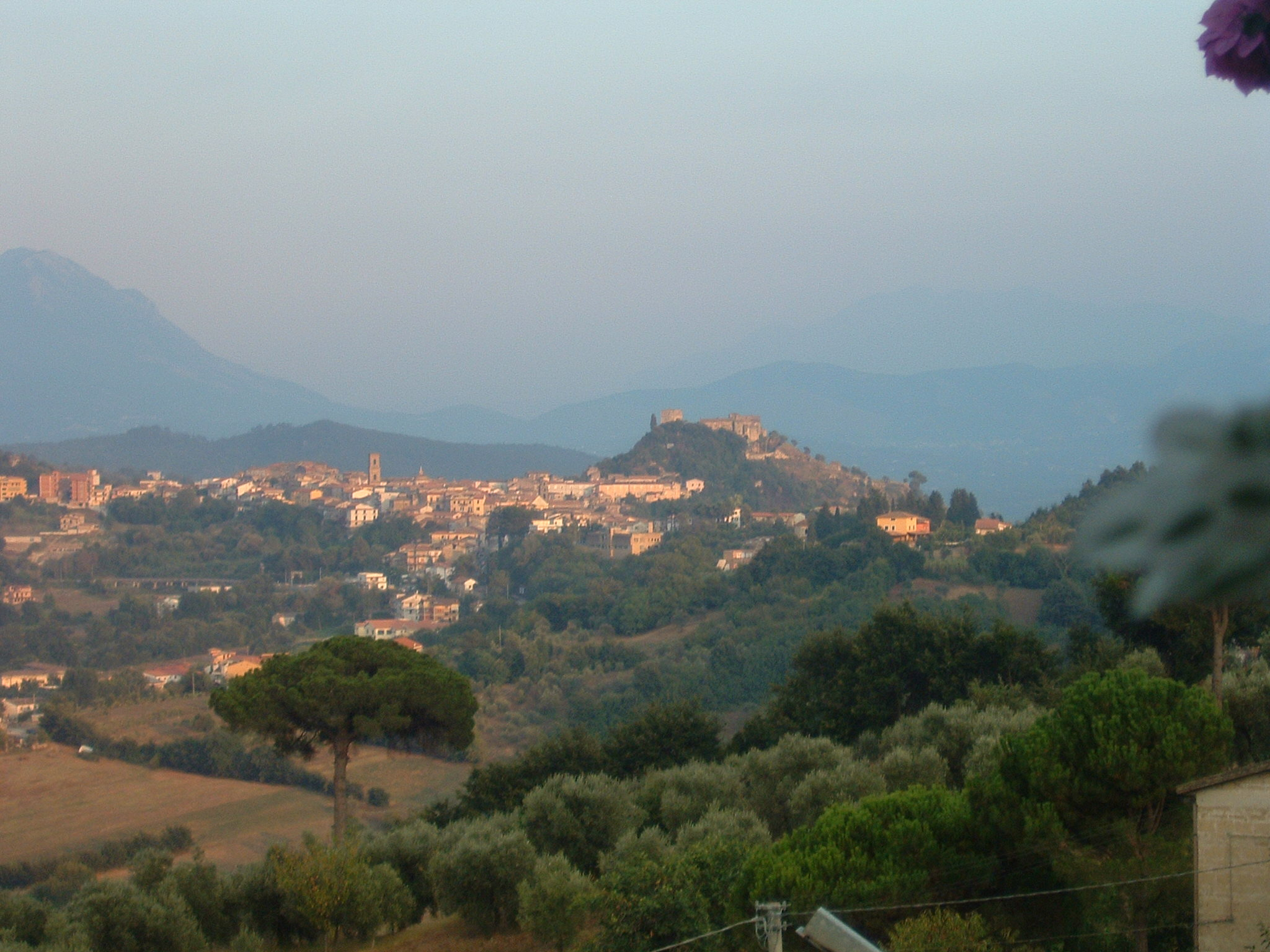

- Location within Italy Location within Campania
- Coordinates: 41°10′40″N 14°21′50″E
- Country: Italy
- Region: Campania
- Province: Caserta (CE)
- Frazioni: San Giovanni e Paolo, Cesarano

Government
  - Mayor: Stefano Giaquinto

Area
  - Total: 36 km^{2} (14 sq mi)
- Elevation: 200 m (660 ft)

Population (31 March 2017)
  - Total: 5,547
  - Density: 150/km^{2} (400/sq mi)
- Demonym: Caiatini
- Time zone: UTC+1 (CET)
  - Summer (DST): UTC+2 (CEST)
- Postal code: 81013
- Dialing code: 0823
- Patron saint: St. Stefano Minicillo
- Saint day: October 29
- Website: http://www.caiazzo.gov.it

Caiazzo is a city and comune in the province of Caserta (Campania) in Italy. It is located on the right bank of the Volturnus, some 20 kilometres (12 mi) northeast of Capua.

Caiazzo is a member of Cittaslow.

== History ==
The ancient Caiatia was already in the hands of the Romans in 306 BC, and since in the 3rd century BC it issued copper coins with a Latin legend it must have had the civitas sine suffragio. In the Social War it rebelled from Rome, and its territory was added to that of Capua by Sulla. In the imperial period, however, it was once more a municipium.

In the Middle Ages it belonged to the Lombard Duchy of Benevento and the County of Capua. The episcopal see was founded in 966. Later Frederick II established here a Treasure Court. It had a castle which was enlarged by the Angevines and, during the reign of Alfonso V of Aragon, housed his mistress Lucrezia d'Alagno. Later Caiazzo was the fief of numerous baronial families of the Kingdom of Naples.

Caiazzo was the seat of anti-royal rebellions at the times of the Neapolitan Republic, and also housed several Carbonari. Despite this, Caiazzo was one of the few towns in the kingdom whose population sided against Garibaldi's expedition which annexed southern Italy to Piedmont.

During World War II, retreating German troops massacred 22 civilians here.

== Main sights ==
Caiazzo has remains of Cyclopean or polygonal masonry walls, and under the Piazza del Mercato is a large Roman cistern, which for centuries continued to provide a good water supply.

The Lombard castle is still in existence.

== Sister cities ==
Caiazzo has a sister relationship with:

- Ochtendung, Germany, since 1996
