= Roccaromana =

- Comune
- Comune di Roccaromana
- Location within Italy Location within Campania
- Coordinates: 41°16′N 14°13′E
- Country: Italy
- Region: Campania
- Province: Caserta (CE)
- Frazioni: Statigliano, Santa Croce

Government
  - Mayor: Nicola Pelosi

Area
  - Total: 27.71 km^{2} (10.70 sq mi)
- Elevation: 180 m (590 ft)

Population (31 March 2017)
  - Total: 858
  - Density: 31.0/km^{2} (80.2/sq mi)
- Demonym: Roccaromanesi
- Time zone: UTC+1 (CET)
  - Summer (DST): UTC+2 (CEST)
- Postal code: 81050
- Dialing code: 0823
- Patron saint: St. Catald
- Saint day: May 10
- Website: Official website

Roccaromana is a comune (municipality) in the Province of Caserta in the Italian region Campania, located about 50 kilometres (31 mi) north of Naples and about 25 kilometres (16 mi) northwest of Caserta.

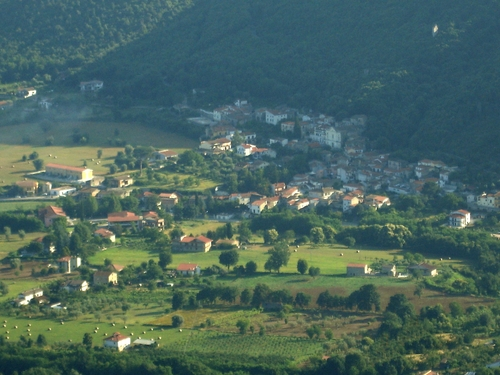
Photo of Roccaromana, taken from Sasso Mancino in 2007

== People ==
- Antonio Senese, poet
