= Caserta =

- Comune
- Comune di Caserta
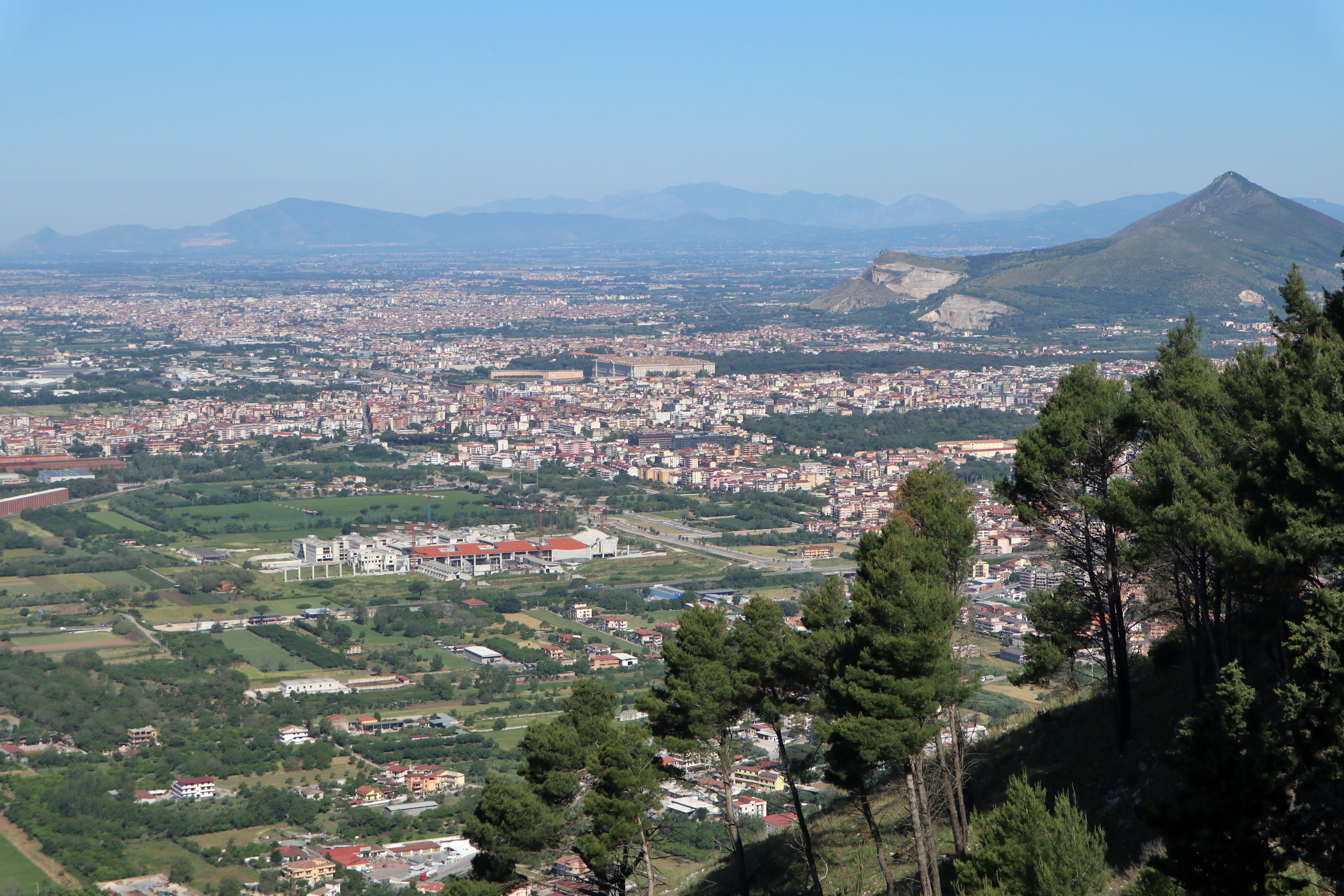
- Skyline

- Flag Coat of arms

- Location within Italy Location within Campania
- Coordinates: 41°04′N 14°20′E
- Country: Italy
- Region: Campania
- Province: Caserta (CE)
- Frazioni: Aldifreda, Briano, Casertavecchia, Casola, Casolla, Centurano, Ercole, Falciano, Garzano, Mezzano, Piedimonte di Casolla, Pozzovetere, Puccianiello, Sala di Caserta, San Benedetto, San Clemente, San Leucio, Santa Barbara, Staturano, Tredici, Tuoro, Vaccheria

Government
  - Mayor: none

Area
  - Total: 54.07 km^{2} (20.88 sq mi)
- Elevation: 68 m (223 ft)

Population (1 January 2016)
  - Total: 76,326
  - Density: 1,412/km^{2} (3,656/sq mi)
- Demonym: Casertani
- Time zone: UTC+1 (CET)
  - Summer (DST): UTC+2 (CEST)
- Postal code: 81100 (Caserta), 81020 (Caserta Vecchia, Casola di Caserta)
- Dialing code: 0823
- Patron saint: St. Sebastian and St. Anne
- Saint day: 20 January and 26 July
- Website: Official website

Caserta (Italian: [kaˈzɛrta] or [kaˈsɛrta]; Neapolitan: [kaˈsertə]) is the capital of the province of Caserta in the Campania region of Italy. An important agricultural, commercial, and industrial comune and city, Caserta is located 36 kilometres north of Naples on the edge of the Campanian plain at the foot of the Campanian Subapennine mountain range. The city is best known for the 18th-century Bourbon Royal Palace of Caserta.

== History ==
Anciently inhabited by Osco-Samnite tribes, modern Caserta was established around the defensive tower built in Lombard times by Pando, Prince of Capua. Pando destroyed the original city around 863. The tower is now part of the Palazzo della Prefettura that was once the seat of the counts of Caserta, as well as a royal residence. The original population moved from Casertavecchia (former bishopric seat) to the current site in the sixteenth century. Casertavecchia was built on the Roman town of Casa Irta, meaning "home village located above" and later contracted as "Caserta".

The city and its vicinity were the property of the Acquaviva family, who, being pressed by huge debts, sold all the land to King Charles VII of Naples. The royal family then selected Caserta for the construction of their new palace which, being inland, was seen as more defensible than the previous palace fronting the Bay of Naples.

At the end of World War II, the royal palace served as the seat of the Supreme Allied Commander. The first Allied war trial took place there in 1945; German general Anton Dostler was sentenced to death and executed nearby, in Aversa.

Pope Francis visited Caserta on Monday, 28 June 2014, together with a friend named Giovanni Traettino, the pastor of an evangelical Protestant Charismatic Pentecostal church. The Pope apologized for the complicity of some Catholics in the persecution of Pentecostals during the fascist regime in Italy.

== Geography ==
Caserta is located 40 kilometres (25 mi) north of Naples. Its municipality borders with Capua, Casagiove, Casapulla, Castel Morrone, Curti, Limatola (BN), Maddaloni, Marcianise, Recale, San Felice a Cancello, San Marco Evangelista, San Nicola la Strada, San Prisco, Sant'Agata de' Goti (BN), Santa Maria Capua Vetere, and Valle di Maddaloni.

=== Frazioni ===
- Casertavecchia - the ancient centre of the comune and former bishopric seat
- San Leucio resort - seat of famous Royal silk workshops, also is included in the World Heritage List
- Vaccheria - which housed the stable of the Royal cattle
- Falciano - a former bishop seat that includes a sixteenth-century palace
- Piedimonte di Casolla - has an ancient Benedictine abbey, built over a Roman temple dedicated to the goddess Diana
- Other "Frazioni": Aldifreda, Briano, Casola, Casolla, Centurano, Ercole, Garzano, Mezzano, Pozzovetere, Puccianiello, Sala di Caserta, San Benedetto, San Clemente, Santa Barbara, Staturano, Tredici, Tuoro

== Climate ==
According to the Köppen climate classification, Caserta experiences a hot-summer Mediterranean climate (Csa). The city of Caserta is located in the largest flat area of Campania and is surrounded by the Apennine mountains. The particular position favours the beneficial influences of the sea which, especially in winter, makes temperatures mild. During the summer season, this area is one of the hottest in the region, with maximum temperatures sometimes exceeding 30 degrees. The inland areas extend to the surrounding mountains, often affected by the cold currents of the north-east with fairly low temperatures and snow in winter. The Matese is the coldest and snowiest in the whole area.

Climate data for Caserta (1961-1990) Elevation 90 m (295 feet)
Month	Jan	Feb	Mar	Apr	May	Jun	Jul	Aug	Sep	Oct	Nov	Dec	Year
Mean daily maximum °C (°F)	12.6 (54.7)	13.4 (56.1)	16.1 (61.0)	19.9 (67.8)	24.1 (75.4)	28.7 (83.7)	31.5 (88.7)	31.4 (88.5)	28.0 (82.4)	22.7 (72.9)	18.0 (64.4)	14.6 (58.3)	21.8 (71.2)
Mean daily minimum °C (°F)	6.6 (43.9)	6.9 (44.4)	9.0 (48.2)	11.5 (52.7)	14.8 (58.6)	18.9 (66.0)	21.2 (70.2)	21.2 (70.2)	18.8 (65.8)	14.9 (58.8)	11.3 (52.3)	8.5 (47.3)	13.6 (56.5)

== Demographics ==
Historical population

Year	Pop.	±%
1861	28,505	—
1871	30,677	+7.6%
1881	31,943	+4.1%
1901	34,303	+7.4%
1911	32,904	−4.1%
1921	35,363	+7.5%
1931	38,224	+8.1%
1936	35,904	−6.1%

Year	Pop.	±%
1951	42,481	+18.3%
1961	48,122	+13.3%
1971	59,960	+24.6%
1981	66,318	+10.6%
1991	69,027	+4.1%
2001	75,208	+9.0%
2011	75,640	+0.6%
2021	73,037	−3.4%

Source: ISTAT

== Honours ==
The city of Caserta distinguished itself during the Second World War; in fact, it was decorated with the gold medal for civil valor and the bronze medal for military valour for the heroic actions and losses suffered during the war. The city was fiercely bombed and suffered a violent reprisal, but it managed to resist and, with the return of peace, all the people collaborated in the reconstruction of Caserta.

== Main sights ==
- Caserta's main attraction is its Palace of Caserta (listed as a UNESCO World Heritage Site). The royal palace ("Reggia") was designed in the eighteenth century by the Italian architect Luigi Vanvitelli, recalling Versailles, as a residence for the Bourbon kings of Naples and Sicily.

As one of the most visited monuments in Italy, the palace has more than 1200 rooms, decorated in various styles. It has been the set for several famous movies such as Star Wars: Episode I – The Phantom Menace, Star Wars: Episode II – Attack of the Clones, Angels & Demons, Mission: Impossible III, and Conclave. The park is 2 miles (3.2 km) long and contains many waterfalls, lakes, and gardens, including a very famous English garden.

- Palazzo Vecchio ("Old Palace"), a construction of the fourteenth century renovated by Luigi Vanvitelli as provisional residence for the royal court
- The cathedral (1800s)
- The Aqueduct of Vanvitelli (eighteenth century)

== Piazzas ==
- Piazza Matteotti is one of oldest squares in the city, it is called "Piazza Mercato" (Market Square) by Casertani, because there is the daily market in a building inaugurated in 2008.
- Piazza Vanvitelli is the main square in the city. The square once included Palazzo Castropignano, but this was subsequently replaced by a modern palace in the early 1960s. The seat of the municipality of Caserta, Palazzo Acquaviva lies within Piazza Vanvitelli as well as the offices of Questura and Prefettura of the Province of Caserta and various banks, shops, hotels, and bars. At the center of the square there is a statue of Luigi Vanvitelli, the architect who designed the Royal Palace of Caserta.

== Gallery ==
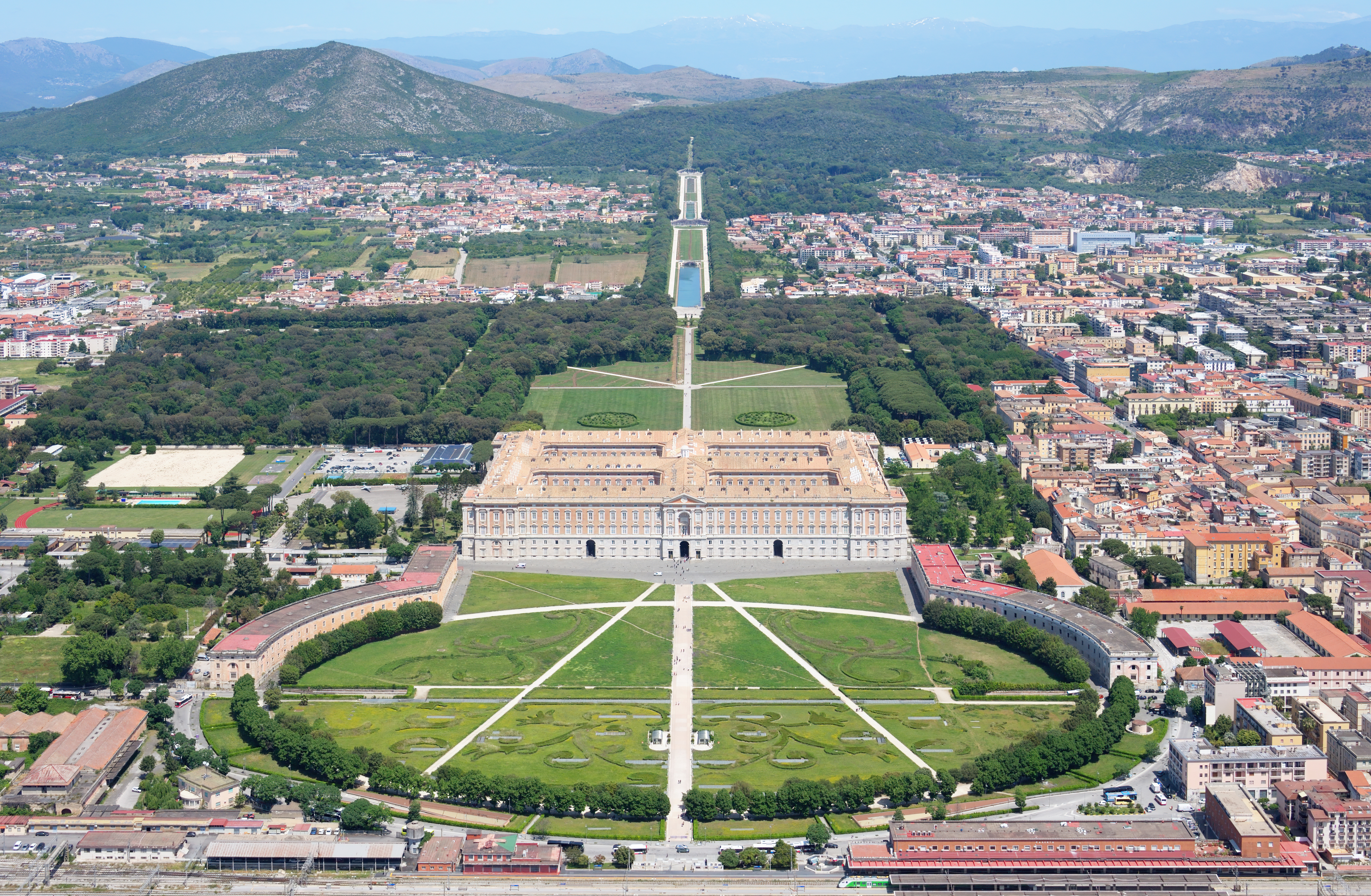
The Royal Palace of Caserta

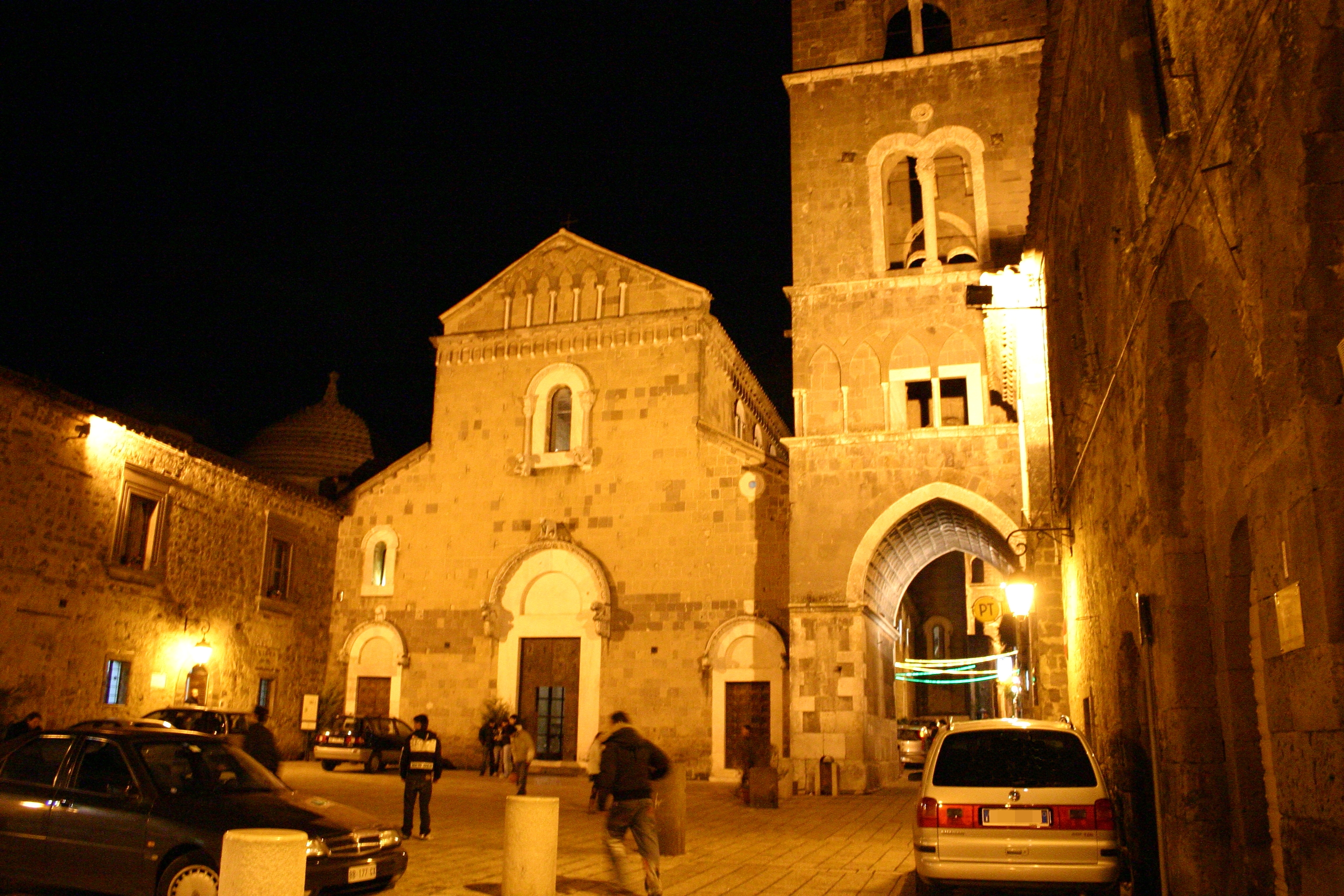
The Cathedral of Casertavecchia

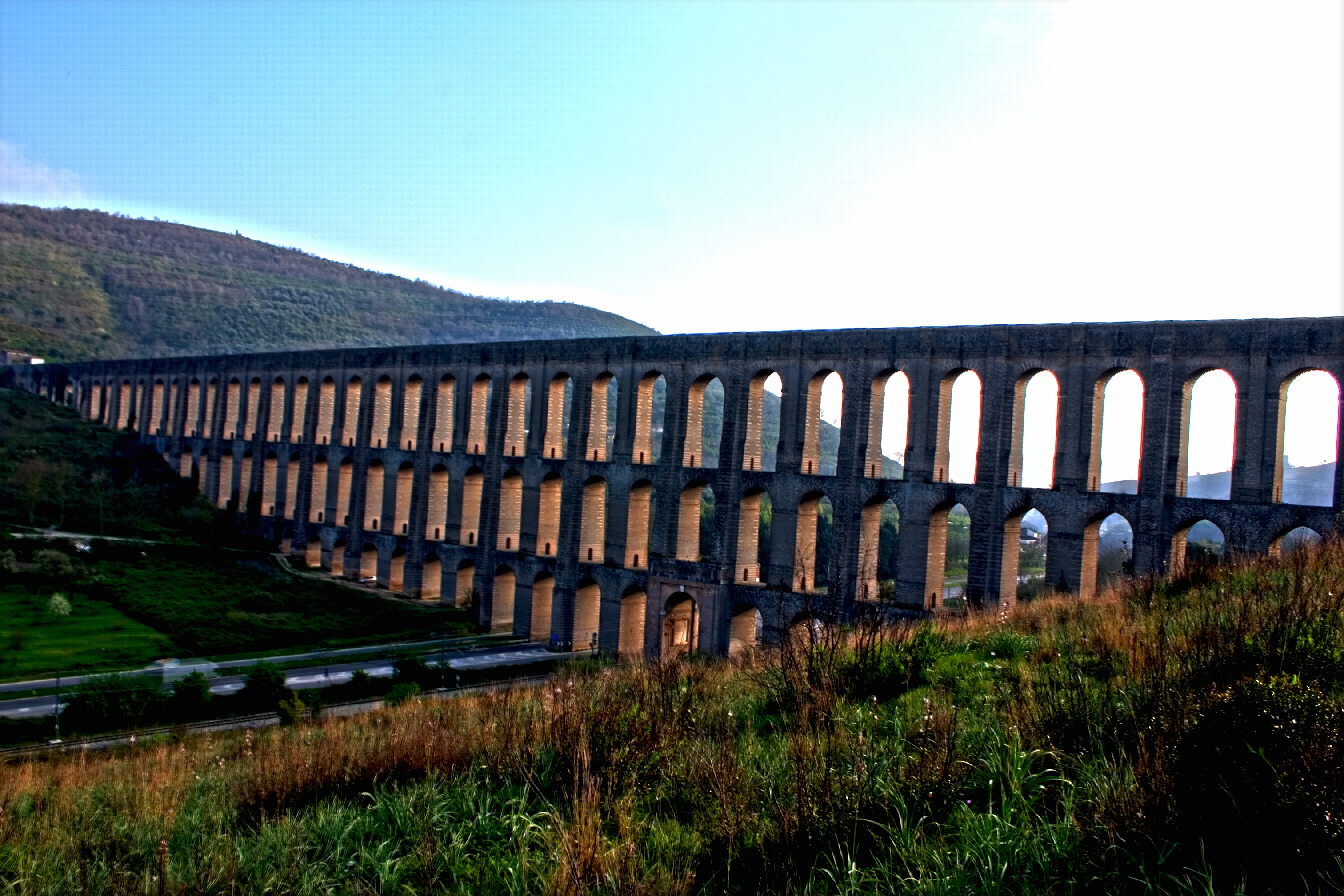
The Aqueduct of Vanvitelli

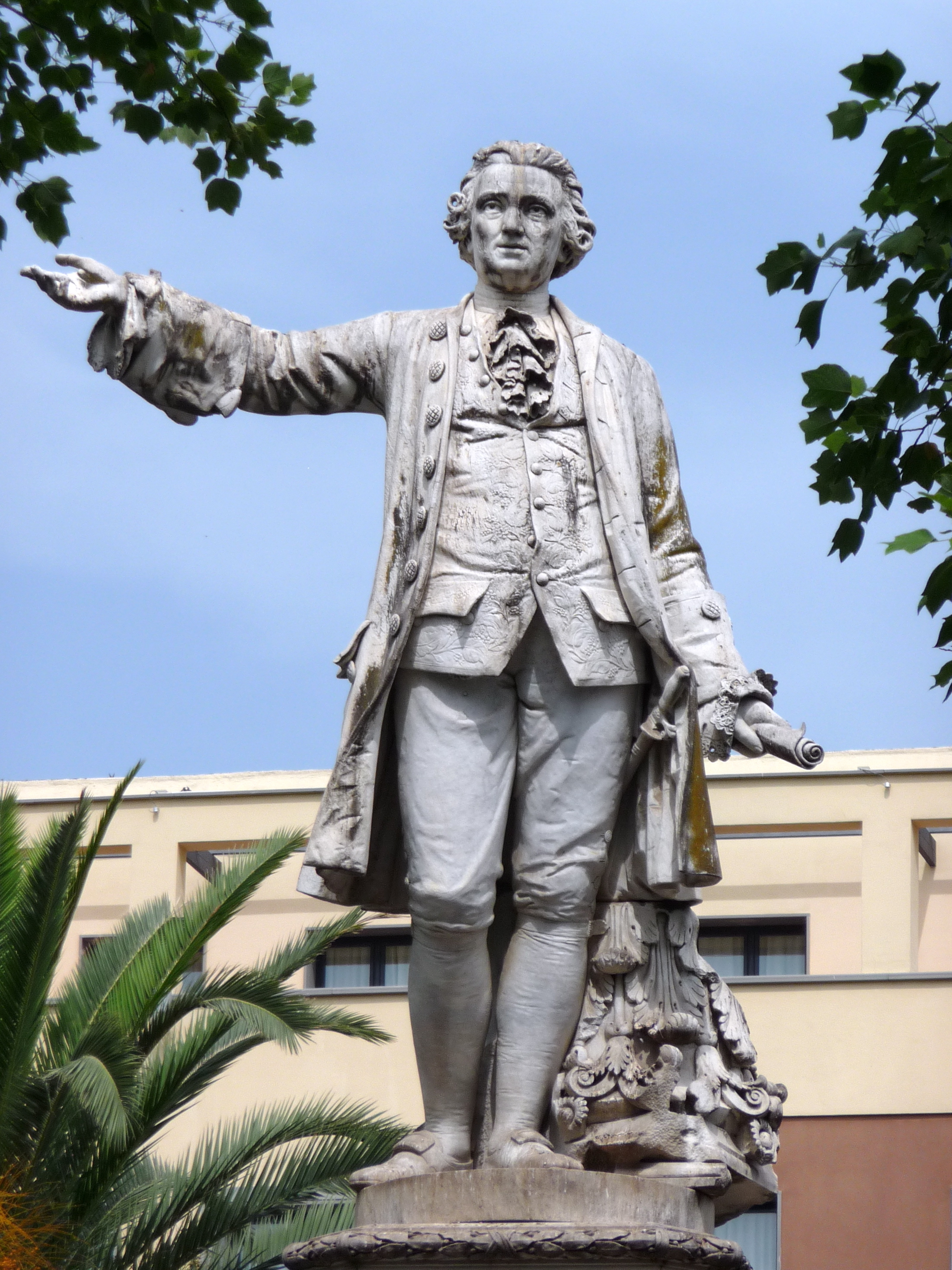
Statue of Luigi Vanvitelli

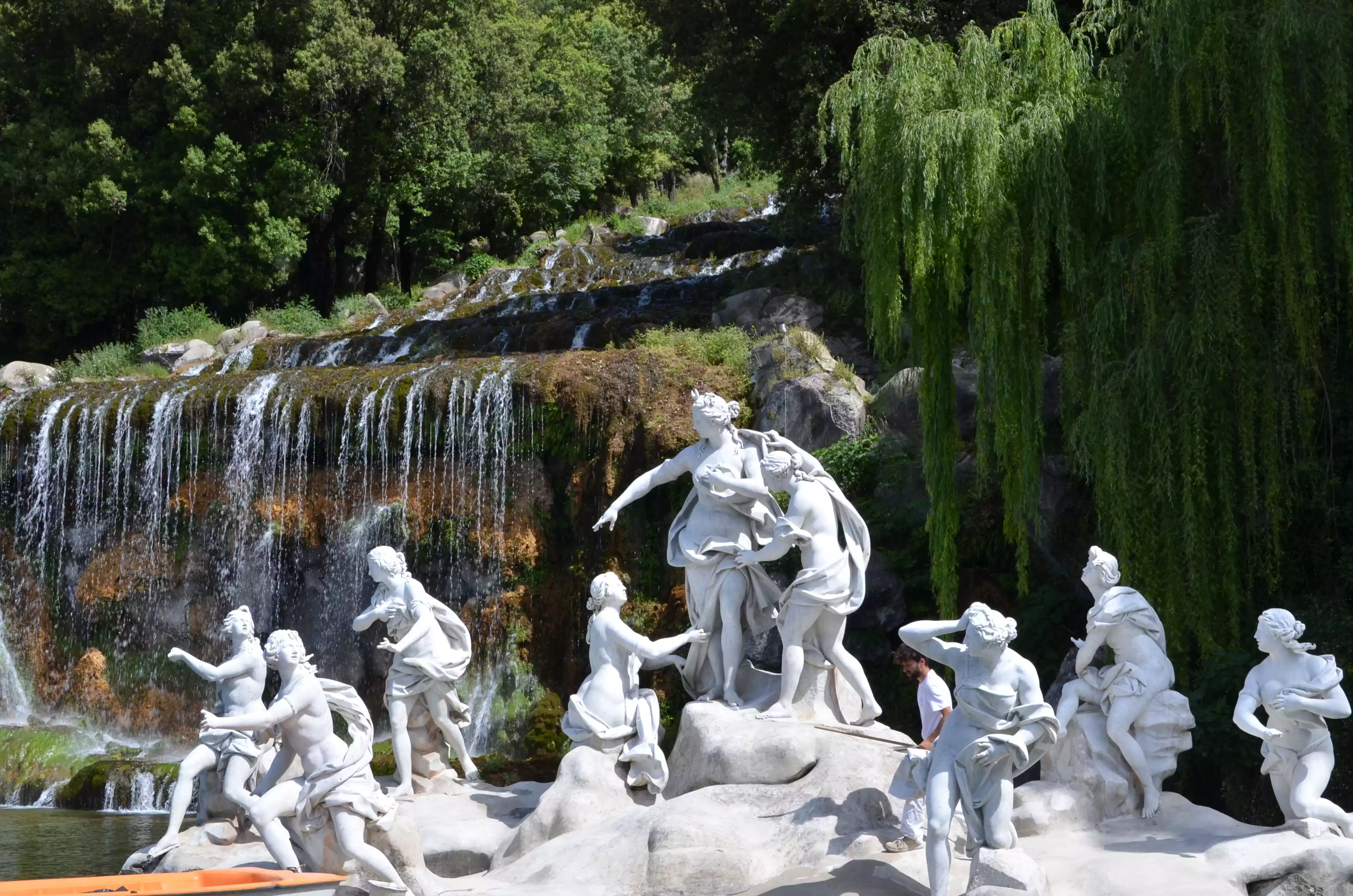
English Garden

== Sport ==
The city has some experience in hosting major international sports events, such as the EuroBasket 1969 and the 2019 Summer Universiade.

It is home to JuveCaserta Basket, Italy's 1991 basketball champion.

== Transport ==
Caserta railway station is a hub for regional and national traffic, and represents an important interchange linking Rome and Naples to Bari. The nearest airport is Naples-Capodichino, located approximately 30 kilometres (19 mi) south.

Caserta is the starting point of the A30 motorway to Salerno and is served by two exits of A1 motorway: Caserta Nord (Caserta North, near Casagiove and Casapulla) and Caserta Sud (Caserta South, near Marcianise and San Marco Evangelista).

== Twin towns – sister cities ==
Caserta is twinned with:

- Pitești, Romania
- Aley, Lebanon

== Notable people ==
- Stash Fiordispino, Italian singer
- Maria Valtorta, Italian writer
- Toni Servillo, Italian actor
- Giulio Douhet, air power theorist
- English cricketer Hedley Verity is buried there, having died in a Caserta hospital on 31 July 1943 of wounds sustained in World War II during the Allied invasion of Sicily.

== See also ==
- Seconda Università degli Studi di Napoli
- Casertana F.C.
