= Pablo Virgilio David =

Filipino bishop and cardinal (born 1959)

His Eminence Pablo Virgilio David
- Cardinal; Bishop of Kalookan
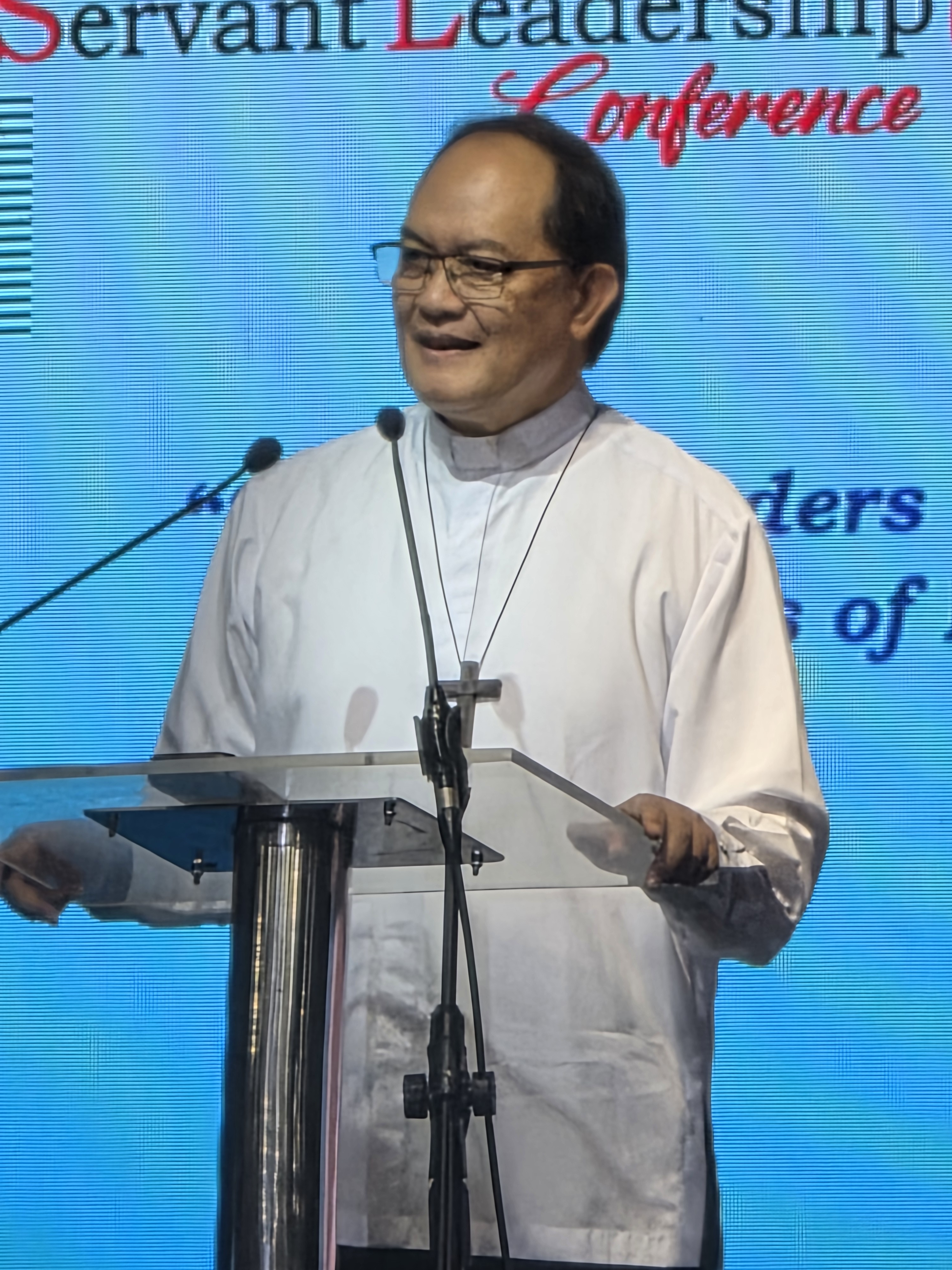
- Cardinal David speaks at a leadership conference at La Salle Green Hills in 2025.
- Church: Catholic Church
- Province: Manila
- See: Kalookan
- Appointed: October 14, 2015
- Installed: January 2, 2016
- Predecessor: Deogracias Iñiguez Jr.
- Other posts: Vice President, Federation of Asian Bishops' Conferences (2025–present); Cardinal-Priest of Trasfigurazione di Nostro Signore Gesù Cristo (2024–present)
- Previous posts: Auxiliary Bishop of San Fernando (2006–2015); Titular Bishop of Guardialfiera (2006–2015); President, Catholic Bishops' Conference of the Philippines (2021–2025)

Orders
- Ordination: March 12, 1983 by Oscar Cruz
- Consecration: July 10, 2006 by Gaudencio Rosales
- Created cardinal: December 7, 2024 by Pope Francis
- Rank: Cardinal-Priest

Personal details
- Born: Pablo Virgilio Siongco David; March 2, 1959 (age 67) Guagua, Pampanga, Philippines
- Denomination: Roman Catholic
- Education: Ateneo de Manila University (BA); Loyola School of Theology (MA); Katholieke Universiteit Leuven (STL, STD)
- Motto: Kenosis (Emptying oneself to receive God's will)
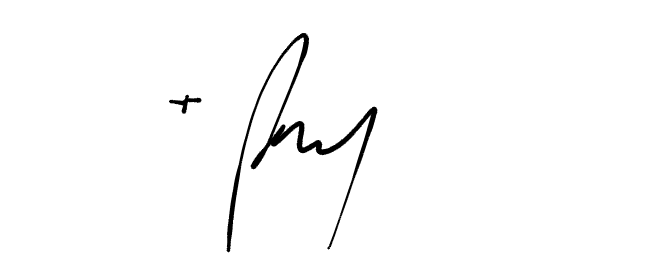
- Signature

Ordination history
History
Priestly ordination
- Ordained by: Oscar Cruz
- Date: March 12, 1983
- Place: Metropolitan Cathedral of San Fernando, San Fernando, Pampanga, Philippines
Episcopal consecration
- Principal consecrator: Gaudencio Rosales
- Co-consecrators: Paciano Aniceto; Angel Lagdameo
- Date: July 10, 2006
- Place: Metropolitan Cathedral of San Fernando, San Fernando, Pampanga, Philippines
Cardinalate
- Elevated by: Pope Francis
- Date: December 7, 2024
Episcopal succession
Bishops consecrated by Pablo Virgilio David as principal consecrator
- Euginius Cañete: December 28, 2024
- Styles
- Reference style: His Eminence
- Spoken style: Your Eminence
- Religious style: Bishop
- Informal style: Cardinal
- See: Kalookan

Pablo Virgilio "Ambo" Siongco David (born March 2, 1959) is a Filipino Catholic prelate who has served as Bishop of Kalookan since 2016, and president of the Catholic Bishops' Conference of the Philippines from 2021 to 2025. Pope Francis made him a cardinal on December 7, 2024.

Preferred to be known by his nickname "Ambo" or "Apu Ambo" ("grandfather Ambo"), he previously served as Auxiliary Bishop of San Fernando from 2006 to 2015. David was named a papabile and a potential dark horse candidate in the 2025 conclave.

== Biography ==
=== Early life and education ===
Pablo Virgilio David was born in Betis, Guagua, Pampanga, on March 2, 1959. He is the 10th of the 13 children of Pedro David and Bienvenida Siongco. His maternal grandfather was the santero artist Victoriano Siongco, who was commissioned by Bishop Cesar Maria Guerrero to carve the canonically crowned statue of the Virgen de los Remedios de Pampanga in 1954. One of his siblings is the sociologist and public intellectual Randy David. He determined his vocation early and asked to attend the minor seminary at the age of ten. From 1970 to 1974 he attended Mother of Good Counsel Minor Seminary in San Fernando, Pampanga, for his secondary education. He earned his bachelor's degree in pre-divinity studies from Ateneo de Manila University in 1978, studied for several years at San Jose Seminary in Loyola Heights, Quezon City, and received his master's degree in theology from the Loyola School of Theology in 1984. During his student years he participated in demonstrations against the Marcos dictatorship.

=== Priest ===
David was ordained a priest of the Archdiocese of San Fernando by Archbishop Oscar Cruz on March 12, 1983. He worked first for a year as an assistant pastor, where he continued his anti-government political activities. He then became director of his alma mater, Mother of Good Counsel Seminary, until 1986. From 1986 to 1991, he studied abroad, earning a licentiate and then a doctorate in sacred theology from the Catholic University of Louvain, a school he chose because of its "progressive" reputation, and he studied at the École biblique et archéologique française de Jérusalem, where he learned Aramaic to enable him to continue his scholarly work on the Book of Daniel.

Returning to the Philippines, David held various leadership and teaching roles at Mother of Good Counsel Seminary. In 2002, he became director of the seminary's Theology Department, while continuing to teach Sacred Scripture. Also in 2002, he was elected vice-president of the Association of Catholic Biblical Scholars of the Philippines and vice-president of the Archdiocesan Media Apostolate Networks.

=== Bishop and cardinal ===
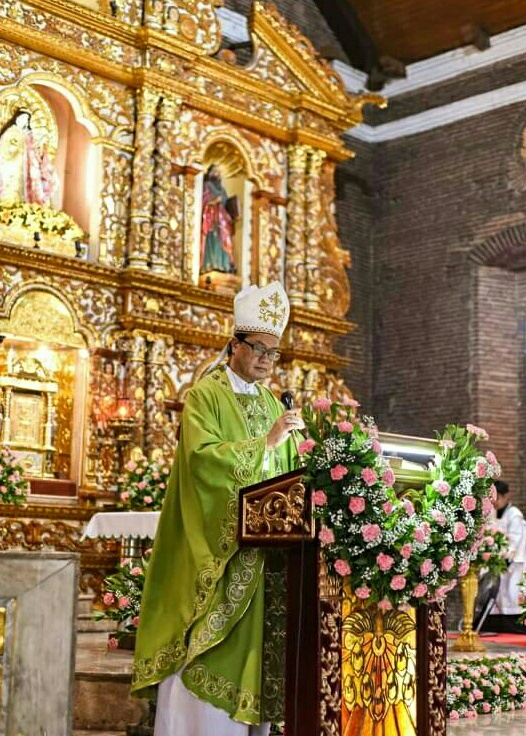
Cardinal David in 2024

On May 27, 2006, he was appointed by Pope Benedict XVI to be auxiliary bishop of San Fernando and titular bishop of the Guardialfiera. He was consecrated as a bishop by Manila Archbishop Cardinal Gaudencio Borbon Rosales, with San Fernando Archbishop Paciano Aniceto and Jaro Archbishop Angel Lagdameo as co-consecrators.

In 2008, David was one of five bishops elected by the Catholic Bishops' Conference of the Philippines (CBCP) to attend the Synod of Bishops on the Word of God in October. He also won back control of shrine at Apung Mamacalulu from the private interests that owned the site of the chapel and commercialized it. He made it a site for popular pilgrimages and initiated the celebration of Mass there, which had previously been prohibited.

Pope Francis named David as the second Bishop of Kalookan on October 14, 2015, succeeding Deogracias Iñiguez Jr. David was installed in the Cathedral of San Roque on January 2, 2016. He also took on the responsibilities of pastor of the cathedral parish.

He has served as a member of the CBCP's Episcopal Commission on Biblical Apostolate, and he was elected to a four-year term as that organization's vice president in December 2017.

David has been a critic of President Rodrigo Duterte's war on drugs. On July 19, 2019, the PNP–Criminal Investigation and Detection Group filed charges against David, fellow bishops Honesto Ongtioco and Socrates Villegas, and members of the opposition for "sedition, cyber libel, libel, estafa, harboring a criminal, and obstruction of justice". The charges were dropped in 2020 due to lack of evidence. In 2026, he criticized Senate President Alan Peter Cayetano's remarks on the drug war as a "pro-life" campaign.

On September 10, 2019, Ateneo de Manila University conferred him its Bukas Palad Award for his service to the poor and his advocacy for fight social justice.

David was elected president of CBCP by its 130 members on July 8, 2021, succeeding Archbishop Romulo Valles on December 1. Archbishop Gilbert Garcera succeeded him in 2025.

The Catholic Bishops' Conference of the Philippines selected David, Bishop Mylo Hubert Vergara, and Cardinal Jose Advincula to represent the Philippines in the Universal Phase of the Synod on Synodality that took place at the Vatican in October 2023 and October 2024. Other Filipinos joining the Synod were Cardinal Luis Antonio Tagle, by virtue of his office as Pro-Prefect of the Dicastery for Evangelization, and Dr. Estela Padilla, a lay Filipino theologian, nominated by Pope Francis.

In October 2023, David was elected as the Asian representative on the 7-member Commission on Information of that year's Synod of Bishops. In February 2024, David was elected as the vice president of the Federation of Asian Bishops' Conferences at the central committee meeting in Bangkok, succeeding Archbishop Malcolm Ranjith.

Coat of arms with the personal arms of the cardinal

On October 6, 2024, Pope Francis announced he planned to make David a cardinal and elevated him in the December 7 consistory. David was named cardinal-priest of Trasfigurazione di Nostro Signore Gesù Cristo. He is the tenth Filipino to join the College of Cardinals, the third Filipino made a cardinal by Pope Francis, the first Filipino made a cardinal while not yet an archbishop, and the first cardinal from the Diocese of Kalookan. He is also the second Filipino Cardinal born from Pampanga, after Rufino Santos, who was born in Guagua, the same hometown. He is in the rarely seen position of a cardinal who is suffragan to another cardinal, the Archbishop of Manila Jose Advincula. Just as he had refused to use the title "Excellency" which is normally accorded a bishop, as cardinal he said that he was "scandalized" by the use of the title "Eminence" for cardinals and hoped it would be abolished. He has said he expects no new assignment, rather to remain as bishop of Kalookan.

On October 23, 2024, the Synod of Bishops elected David a member of the Ordinary Council of the General Secretariat of the Synod.

During a Simbang Gabi homily on December 24, 2024, David criticized Israel's Gaza war, saying that the biblical Israel is different from the State of Israel and that "if the Holy Family were to look for an inn today, they would not stay in Bethlehem but in the Gaza Strip and find a collapsed house in which to give birth to the Son of God".

On January 12, 2025, Pope Francis named him a member of the Dicastery for the Doctrine of the Faith.

David was one of three cardinal electors from the Philippines (the others being Luis Antonio Tagle and Advincula) to participate in the 2025 conclave that elected Pope Leo XIV. On April 24, David was among the earliest cardinal electors to give an interview about the forthcoming conclave to elect a successor to Pope Francis. Prior to and during the conclave, some media outlets listed David as a potential dark horse candidate for the papacy. The Italian media reported afterwards that Cardinal David went as far as getting more votes than that of the early frontrunner, Cardinal Tagle, during the early rounds of the conclave.

David is also a critic of online gambling. In July 2025, the CBCP released a pastoral letter condemning such, likening it to a plague epidemic. He criticized the government for fueling online gambling addiction, describing the Internet as a "digital highway" where people fall to new forms of exploitation. The Philippine Amusement and Gaming Corporation (PAGCOR) subsequently argued that it helps generate revenue for the government. David rejected PAGCOR's defense, comparing it to legalizing illegal drugs just for the sake of increased government income.

David took canonical possession of his titular Church, Trasfigurazione di Nostro Signore Gesù Cristo, in Rome on October 19, 2025, as announced by the Office for the Liturgical Celebrations of the Supreme Pontiff.

== Writings ==
David has authored several works of popular theology.

With his co-editor Nina L.B. Tomen he has created three volumes focused on Angeles City, one on the devotion centered on the statue depicting the burial of Jesus Christ known as Apung Mamacalulu, Apung Mamacalulu: The Santo Entierro of Angeles City; another on popular religion in the old town of Betis there; and one on Holy Rosary Parish Church, Pisamban Maragul: The Living Church of Angeles City, designed to be presented to Pope Francis on his visit to the Philippines in January 2015. David said: "The Pope knows well that many old heritage churches in Europe have practically become dead churches or sheer museums. The book is not just about an old building; it is about a living Church." Its 350 pages included archival documents, memoirs of parishioners, and rare photographs. It concerned the church structure and its furnishings, but also documented nonmaterial expressions of faith that deserve preservation: popular devotions, rites, rituals, traditions, sacred music and other nonmaterial forms of faith.

Also with Tomen, The Gospel of Mercy According to Juan/a (Makati City, Philippines: St. Pauls Philippines, 2016). The Juan/Juana of the title refers to any ordinary person, male or female. A collection of essays by each of the authors, with a co-authored preface.

== See also ==
- Catholic Church in the Philippines
- Cardinals created by Pope Francis

Catholic Church titles
Preceded by Gaetano Di Pierro	— TITULAR — Bishop of Guardialfiera; 10 July 2006 – 14 October 2015	Succeeded by Adilson Pedro Busin
Preceded by Deogracias Iñiguez Jr.	Bishop of Kalookan; 2 January 2016 – present	Incumbent
Preceded by Romulo Valles	President of the Catholic Bishops' Conference of the Philippines; 1 December 2021 – 30 November 2025	Succeeded by Gilbert Garcera
Preceded by Pedro Rubiano Sáenz	Cardinal Priest of Trasfigurazione di Nostro Signore Gesù Cristo; 7 December 2024 – present	Incumbent
Preceded by Malcolm Ranjith	Vice-President of the Federation of Asian Bishops' Conferences; 1 January 2025 – present	Incumbent
