= Antonio Benedetti =

Antonio Benedetti may refer to

- Antonio Benedetti (Bishop of Guardialfiera) (died 1552)
- Antonio Benedetti (1715–1788), Italian scholar
