= Cordella =

Cordella may refer to:

- Cordella, a Daughter of Albion in William Blake's mythology
- HMS Cordella, a mine countermeasures vessel of the Royal Navy

== People with the given name ==
- Cordella Stevenson, American murder victim

== People with the surname ==
- Giacomo Cordella (1786–1847), Italian classical composer
- Juan Cordella (died 1552), Italian Roman Catholic bishop
