= Marco Antonio Marzolinus =

Most Reverend Bishop of Guardialfiera
- Marco Antonio Marzolinus
- Church: Catholic Church
- Diocese: Diocese of Guardialfiera
- In office: 1533–1543
- Predecessor: Girolamo Vascheri
- Successor: Giovanni Battisti de Lisulis

Personal details
- Died: 1543 Guardialfiera, Italy

Marco Antonio Marzolinus (died 1543) was a Roman Catholic prelate who served as Bishop of Guardialfiera (1533–1543).

== Biography ==
On 27 August 1533, Marco Antonio Marzolinus was appointed during the papacy of Pope Clement VII as Bishop of Guardialfiera. He served as Bishop of Guardialfiera until his death in 1543.

== External links and additional sources ==
- Cheney, David M. "Diocese of Guardialfiera (Guardia)". Catholic-Hierarchy.org. (for Chronology of Bishops) ^{[self-published]}
- Chow, Gabriel. "Titular Episcopal See of Guardialfiera (Italy)". GCatholic.org. (for Chronology of Bishops) ^{[self-published]}

Catholic Church titles
Preceded by Girolamo Vascheri	Bishop of Guardialfiera; 1533–1543	Succeeded by Giovanni Battisti de Lisulis
