= Zacharias Ferreri =

Italian monk and papal legate

Most Reverend Zacharias Ferrari
- Bishop of Guardialfiera
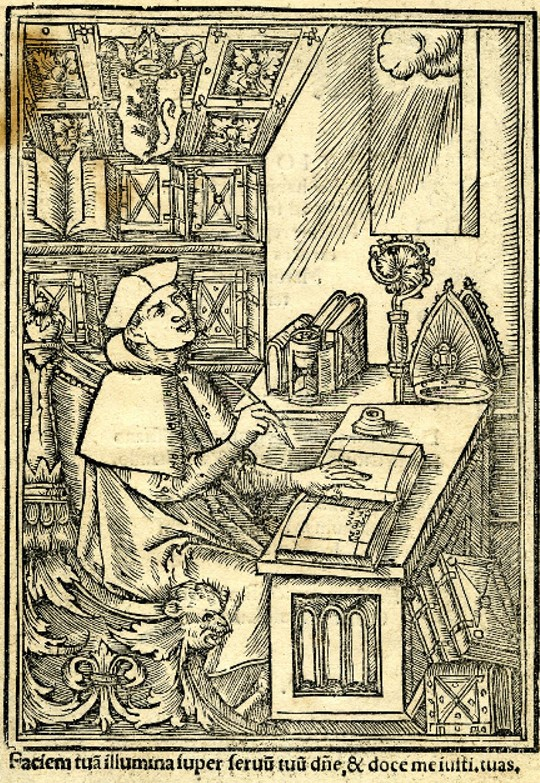
- Church: Catholic Church
- Diocese: Diocese of Guardialfiera
- In office: 1519 and 1521–1524
- Predecessor: Valentinus de Valentiuis
- Successor: Girolamo Vascheri
- Previous post: Titular Bishop of Sebaste in Cilicia (1518–1519)

Personal details
- Died: 1524 Guardialfiera, Italy

Zacharias Ferreri or Ferrari (1479–1524) was an Italian monk and papal legate, Latin poet and ecclesiastical writer.

== Biography ==
Ferreri was born in Vicenza to a noble family. As a student in Padua, he became a Benedictine monk at the Abbey of Monte Cassino. However, at the age of 25 he left the monastery and moved to Rome. He finished his education receiving master's degrees in law and theology. He served Pope Julius II but soon joined ranks of his opponents and attended the Conciliabulum of Pisa in 1511. For these activities he was excommunicated in 1513. He made peace with the new Pope Leo X and was tasked with preparing a new, shorter and more convenient, edition of the breviary. In 1518 he became titular Bishop of Sebaste in Cilicia and was nominated to become Bishop of Guardialfiera. He renounced the nomination two months later, but kept the title and rights.

In 1520–21 he was sent as a papal legate to the Kingdom of Poland and Grand Duchy of Lithuania. In Poland he mediated a truce in the Polish–Teutonic War (1519–21) and campaigned against the spread of Lutheranism. In Lithuania he investigated evidence for the canonization of Saint Casimir. His planned journey to the Grand Duchy of Moscow was cancelled. In 1521, he returned to Rome and continued working on the breviary. After the death of Pope Leo X on 1 December 1521, he claimed his rights as Bishop of Guardialfiera then occupied by Valentinus de Valentiuis. His breviary was published after his death in 1524.

== Bibliography ==
- Apologia sacri Pisani consilii (1511; regarding the Conciliabulum of Pisa)
- Lugdunense somnium, Lugdunense somnium somnium Lugdunense somnium de Leonis X ad summum pontificatum divina promotione (panegyric poem for Pope Leo X)
- Vita Beati Casimiri Confessoris (1521; regarding canonization of Saint Casimir)
- Hymni novi ecclesiastici (1525; revised breviary)

Catholic Church titles
Preceded by Gaspard de Savoie	Titular Bishop of Sebaste in Cilicia; 1518–1519	Succeeded by Pietro Ricorda
Preceded by Marco Antonio Vascheri	Bishop of Guardialfiera (1st time); 1519	Succeeded by Valentinus de Valentiuis
Preceded by Valentinus de Valentiuis	Bishop of Guardialfiera (2nd time); 1521–1524	Succeeded by Girolamo Vascheri
