= Alticotius de Alticotiis =

Italian Catholic bishop (fl 1572 – 1575)

Most Reverend Alticotius de Alticotiis
- Bishop of Guardialfiera
- Church: Catholic Church
- Diocese: Diocese of Guardialfiera
- In office: 1572–1575
- Predecessor: Carlo Carafa (bishop)
- Successor: Francesco Indelli

Personal details
- Died: 1575 Guardialfiera, Italy

Alticotius de Alticotiis (died 1575) was a Roman Catholic prelate who served as the Bishop of Guardialfiera (1572–1575).

== Biography ==
On 13 August 1572, Alticotius de Alticotiis was appointed by Pope Gregory XIII as Bishop of Guardialfiera. He served as Bishop of Guardialfiera until his death in 1575

== External links and additional sources ==
- Cheney, David M. "Diocese of Guardialfiera (Guardia)". Catholic-Hierarchy.org. (for Chronology of Bishops) ^{[self-published]}
- Chow, Gabriel. "Titular Episcopal See of Guardialfiera (Italy)". GCatholic.org. (for Chronology of Bishops) ^{[self-published]}

Catholic Church titles
Preceded by Carlo Carafa (bishop)	Bishop of Guardialfiera; 1552–1575	Succeeded by Francesco Indelli
