= Francesco Indelli =

Most Reverend Francesco Indelli
- Bishop of Guardialfiera
- Church: Catholic Church
- Diocese: Diocese of Guardialfiera
- In office: 1575–1580
- Predecessor: Alticotius de Alticotiis
- Successor: Pompilio Perotti

Personal details
- Died: 1580 Guardialfiera, Italy

Francesco Indelli (died 1580) was a Roman Catholic prelate who served as Bishop of Guardialfiera (1575–1580).

== Biography ==
On 14 October 1575, Francesco Indelli was appointed by Pope Gregory XIII as Bishop of Guardialfiera. He served as Bishop of Guardialfiera until his death in 1580.

== External links and additional sources ==
- Cheney, David M. "Diocese of Guardialfiera (Guardia)". Catholic-Hierarchy.org. (for Chronology of Bishops) ^{[self-published]}
- Chow, Gabriel. "Titular Episcopal See of Guardialfiera (Italy)". GCatholic.org. (for Chronology of Bishops) ^{[self-published]}

Catholic Church titles
Preceded by Alticotius de Alticotiis	Bishop of Guardialfiera; 1575–1580	Succeeded by Pompilio Perotti
