= Trasfigurazione di Nostro Signore Gesù Cristo =

- Church of the Transfiguration of Our Lord Jesus Christ
- Trasfigurazione di N.S.G.C.
- Chiesa della Trasfigurazione di Nostro Signore Gesù Cristo
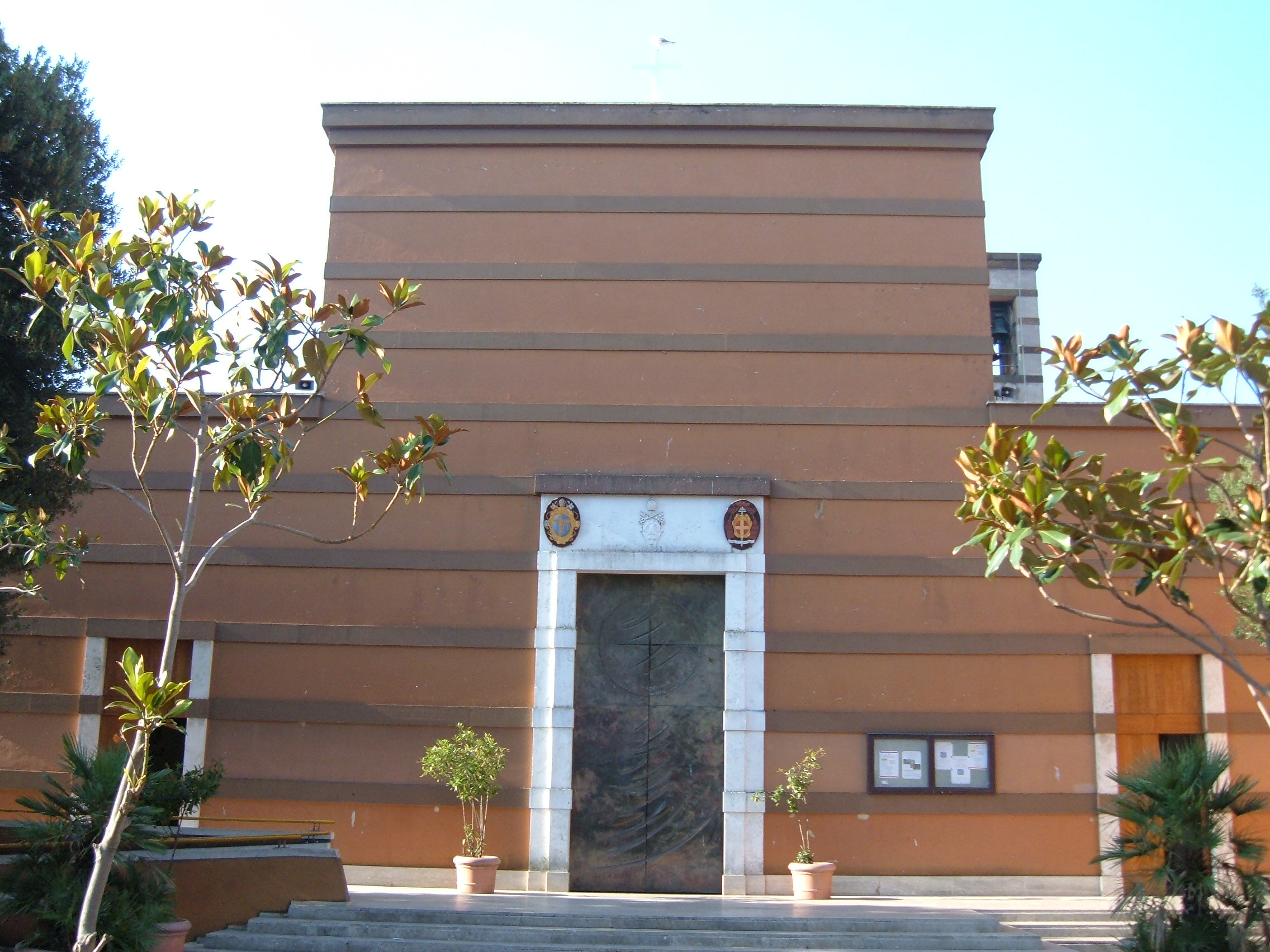
- Facade
- Click on the map for a fullscreen view
- 41°52′15″N 12°26′48″E
- Location: Piazza della Trasfigurazione 2, Gianicolense, Rome
- Country: Italy
- Language: Italian
- Denomination: Catholic
- Tradition: Roman Rite
- Website: trasfigurazione.it

History
- Status: titular church
- Dedication: Transfiguration of Jesus
- Consecrated: 1936

Architecture
- Architect: Tullio Rossi
- Architectural type: Rationalist, Egyptian Revival
- Groundbreaking: 1934
- Completed: 1936

Administration
- Diocese: Rome

Trasfigurazione di Nostro Signore Gesù Cristo is a 20th-century parochial church and titular church in the western suburbs of Rome, dedicated to the Transfiguration of Jesus.

== History ==
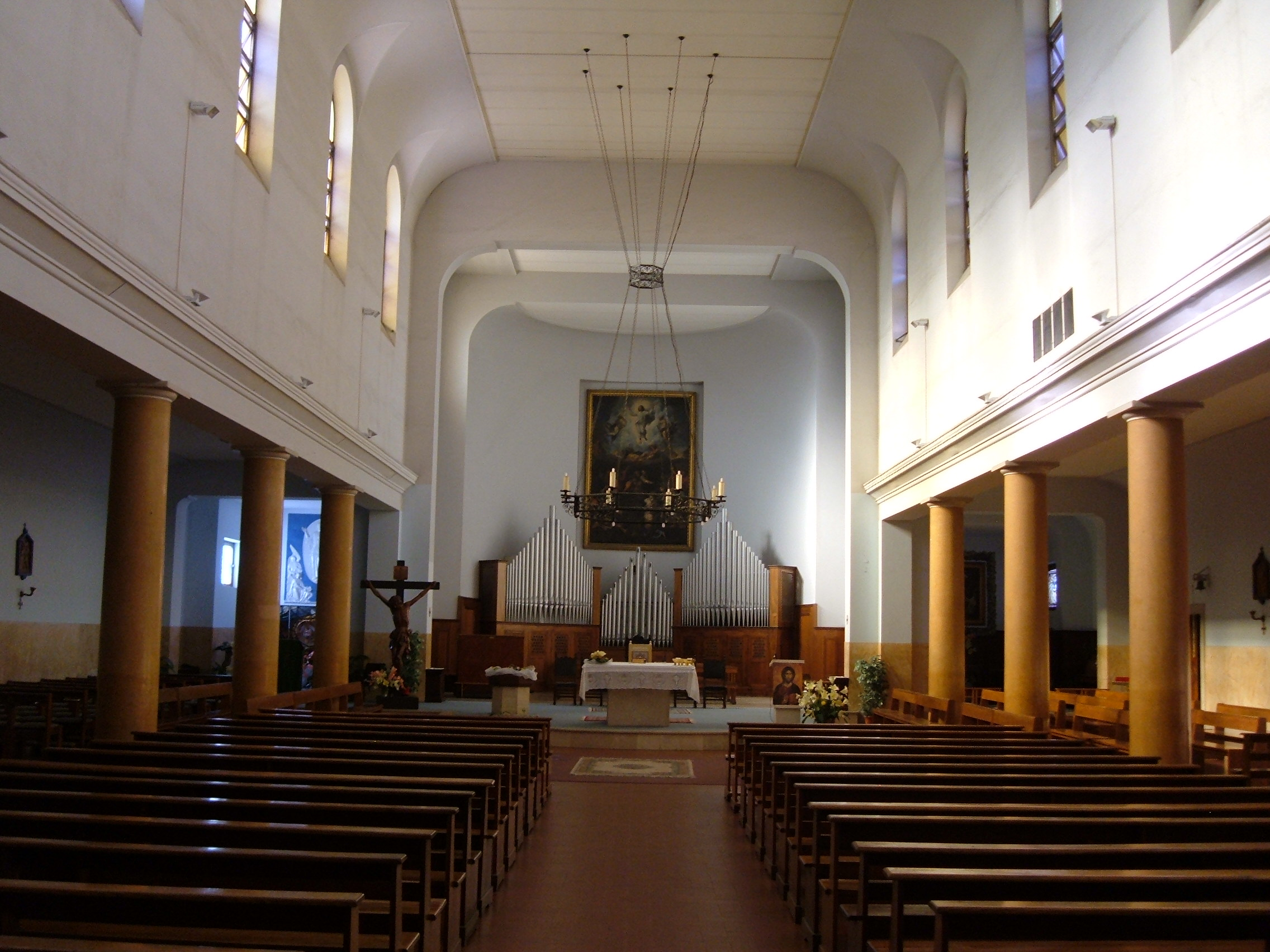
View of interior

The church was built in 1934–36, designed by Tullio Rossi. Behind the altar is a reproduction of Raphael's Transfiguration.

The martyr Fr. Andrea Santoro (1945–2006) was priest at Trasfigurazione di Nostro Signore Gesù Cristo in 1971–81.

On 21 February 2001, it was made a titular church to be held by a cardinal-priest.

Cardinal-Protectors

- Pedro Rubiano Sáenz (2001–2024)
- Pablo Virgilio David (2024–present)

== See also ==
- Church of the Transfiguration
