= Valentinus de Valentiuis =

Most Reverend Valentinus de Valentiuis
- Bishop of Guardialfiera
- Church: Catholic Church
- In office: 1519–?
- Predecessor: Zacharias Ferrari
- Successor: Zacharias Ferrari

Valentinus de Valentiuis was a Roman Catholic prelate who served as Bishop of Guardialfiera (1519–?).

== Biography ==
On 2 December 1519, Valentinus de Valentiuis was appointed during the papacy of Pope Julius II as Bishop of Guardialfiera replacing bishop Zacharias Ferreri who renounced his nomination two months after his appointment. It is uncertain how long he served as Ferreri claimed his rights as Bishop of Guardialfiera after the death of Pope Leo X on 1 Dec 1521.

== External links and additional sources ==
- Cheney, David M. "Diocese of Guardialfiera (Guardia)". Catholic-Hierarchy.org. (for Chronology of Bishops) ^{[self-published]}
- Chow, Gabriel. "Titular Episcopal See of Guardialfiera (Italy)". GCatholic.org. (for Chronology of Bishops) ^{[self-published]}

Catholic Church titles
Preceded by Zacharias Ferrari	Bishop of Guardialfiera; 1519–?	Succeeded by Zacharias Ferrari
