= Girolamo Vascheri =

Catholic prelate

Most Reverend Girolamo Vascheri
- Bishop of Guardialfiera
- Church: Catholic Church
- Diocese: Diocese of Guardialfiera
- In office: 1524–1533
- Predecessor: Zacharias Ferrari
- Successor: Marco Antonio Marzolinus
- Previous post: Bishop of Shkodrë (1522–1524)

Girolamo Vascheri, O.F.M. was a Roman Catholic prelate who served as Bishop of Guardialfiera (1524–1533) and Bishop of Shkodrë (1522–1524).

== Biography ==
Girolamo Vascheri was ordained a priest in the Order of Friars Minor. On 3 October 1522, he was appointed during the papacy of Pope Adrian VI as Bishop of Shkodrë. On 19 September 1524, he was appointed during the papacy of Pope Clement VII as Bishop of Guardialfiera. He served as Bishop of Guardialfiera until his resignation in 1533.

== External links and additional sources ==
- Cheney, David M. "Diocese of Shkodrë (Scutari)". Catholic-Hierarchy.org. (for Chronology of Bishops) ^{[self-published]}
- Chow, Gabriel. "Metropolitan Archdiocese of Shkodrë–Pult". GCatholic.org. (for Chronology of Bishops) ^{[self-published]}
- Cheney, David M. "Diocese of Guardialfiera (Guardia)". Catholic-Hierarchy.org. (for Chronology of Bishops) ^{[self-published]}
- Chow, Gabriel. "Titular Episcopal See of Guardialfiera (Italy)". GCatholic.org. (for Chronology of Bishops) ^{[self-published]}

Catholic Church titles
Preceded by Pedro Cardona	Bishop of Shkodrë; 1522–1524	Succeeded by Antonio Beccari
Preceded by Zacharias Ferrari	Bishop of Guardialfiera; 1524–1533	Succeeded by Marco Antonio Marzolinus
