= Giovanni Battisti de Lisulis =

Most Reverend Giovanni Battisti de Lisulis
- Bishop of Guardialfiera
- Church: Catholic Church
- Diocese: Diocese of Guardialfiera
- In office: 1543–1548
- Predecessor: Marco Antonio Marzolinus
- Successor: Juan Cordella

Personal details
- Died: 1548 Guardialfiera, Italy

Giovanni Battisti de Lisulis (died 1548) was a Roman Catholic prelate who served as Bishop of Guardialfiera (1543–1548).

== Biography ==
On 16 February 1543, Giovanni Battisti de Lisulis was appointed by Pope Paul III as Bishop of Guardialfiera. He served as Bishop of Guardialfiera until his death in 1548.

== External links and additional sources ==
- Cheney, David M. "Diocese of Guardialfiera (Guardia)". Catholic-Hierarchy.org. (for Chronology of Bishops) ^{[self-published]}
- Chow, Gabriel. "Titular Episcopal See of Guardialfiera (Italy)". GCatholic.org. (for Chronology of Bishops) ^{[self-published]}

Catholic Church titles
| Preceded by Marco Antonio Marzolinus | Bishop of Guardialfiera; 1543–1548 | Succeeded by Juan Cordella |
