= Giacomo Lomellino del Canto =

Italian Catholic bishop (died 1575)

Most Reverend Giacomo Lomellino del Canto
- Archbishop of Palermo
- Church: Catholic Church
- Diocese: Archdiocese of Palermo
- Predecessor: Juan Segría
- Successor: Cesare Marullo
- Previous posts: Bishop of Guardialfiera (1557–1562); Bishop of Mazara del Vallo (1562–1571)

Personal details
- Died: 9 August 1575 Palermo, Italy

Giacomo Lomellino del Canto (died 9 August 1575) was a Roman Catholic prelate who served as Archbishop of Palermo (1571–1575), Bishop of Mazara del Vallo (1562–1571), and Bishop of Guardialfiera (1557–1562).

== Biography ==
On 21 June 1557, Giacomo Lomellino del Canto was appointed by Pope Paul IV as Bishop of Guardialfiera. On 17 April 1562, he was appointed by Pope Pius IV as Bishop of Mazara del Vallo. On 10 Jan 1571, he was appointed by Pope Pius V as Archbishop of Palermo. He served as Archbishop of Palermo until his death on 9 August 1575.

While bishop, he was the principal co-consecrator of Ludovico de Torres, Archbishop of Monreale (1573) and Marco Saracini, Bishop of Volterra (1574).

== External links and additional sources ==
- Cheney, David M. "Diocese of Guardialfiera (Guardia)". Catholic-Hierarchy.org. (for Chronology of Bishops) ^{[self-published]}
- Chow, Gabriel. "Titular Episcopal See of Guardialfiera (Italy)". GCatholic.org. (for Chronology of Bishops) ^{[self-published]}
- Cheney, David M. "Diocese of Mazara del Vallo". Catholic-Hierarchy.org. (for Chronology of Bishops) ^{[self-published]}
- Chow, Gabriel. "Diocese of Mazara del Vallo (Italy)". GCatholic.org. (for Chronology of Bishops) ^{[self-published]}

Catholic Church titles
Preceded by Antonio Benedetti	Bishop of Guardialfiera; 1557–1562	Succeeded by Giovanni Battista Lomellino
Preceded by Girolamo de Terminis	Bishop of Mazara del Vallo; 1562–1571	Succeeded by Juan Beltrán de Guevara
Preceded by Juan Segría	Archbishop of Palermo; 1571–1575	Succeeded by Cesare Marullo
