= Gasparo Luigi Oderico =

Italian numismatist, antiquarian, and Jesuit priest (1725–1803)

- Born: 24 December 1725; Genoa, Republic of Genoa
- Died: 10 December 1803; Genoa, Ligurian Republic
- Occupations: Jesuit priest, librarian, numismatist

Gasparo Luigi Oderico (11 October 1725 - 10 January 1803) was an Italian numismatist, antiquarian, and Jesuit priest.

== Biography ==
Gasparo Luigi Oderico was born in Genoa in 1725. Following completion of his studies, he entered the Jesuit order in 1741. From an early age, he developed a passion for ancient inscriptions, medals, and coins. He was patronized by Cardinal Giuseppe Spinelli, and under his orders appointed to a professorship in theology at the Scots College in Rome. After the suppression of the Society of Jesus (1773), Oderico retired to Genoa, where he was appointed City Librarian. In 1787, he went to Turin with his brother, to conduct some negotiations, and remained there six years.

The Revolution of Genoa (1797) deprived him of his office; but after the reorganization of the university he regained the office, and at the same period he was elected member of the Istituto ligure. He died of apoplexy, January 10, 1803, aged 77. He was a prolific author on archaeological topics. He also published a treatise titled Dissertazione su le medaglie greche, non ancora descritte dagli antiquarii (1777) along with Antonio Benedetti. He was admitted a member of the Etruscan academy of Cortona, under the name of Teodemo Ostracino.

== Works ==
- Dissertazione sopra un'antica iscrizione (Stamperia di Generoso Salomoni, Rome, 1756)
- De argenteo Orcitirigis numo coniecturae. (1767)
- Dissertationes et adnotationes in aliquot ineditas veterum inscriptiones et numismata accedunt inscriptiones et monumenta quae extant in bibliotheca monachorum camaldulensium S. Gregorii in Monte Coelio explicationibus illustrata. (1765)
- Osservazioni di Gasparo Luigi Oderico sopra alcuni codici della libreria di G. Filippo Durazzo (Tipografia del R. Istituto Sordo-Muti, Genoa, 1881)
