= Apung Mamacalulu =

Church building in the Philippines

Apung Mamacalulu Archdiocesan Shrine of our Lord Jesus Christ of the Holy Sepulchre Santuario Arquidiocesano de Nuestro Señor Jesucristo del Santo Sepulcro
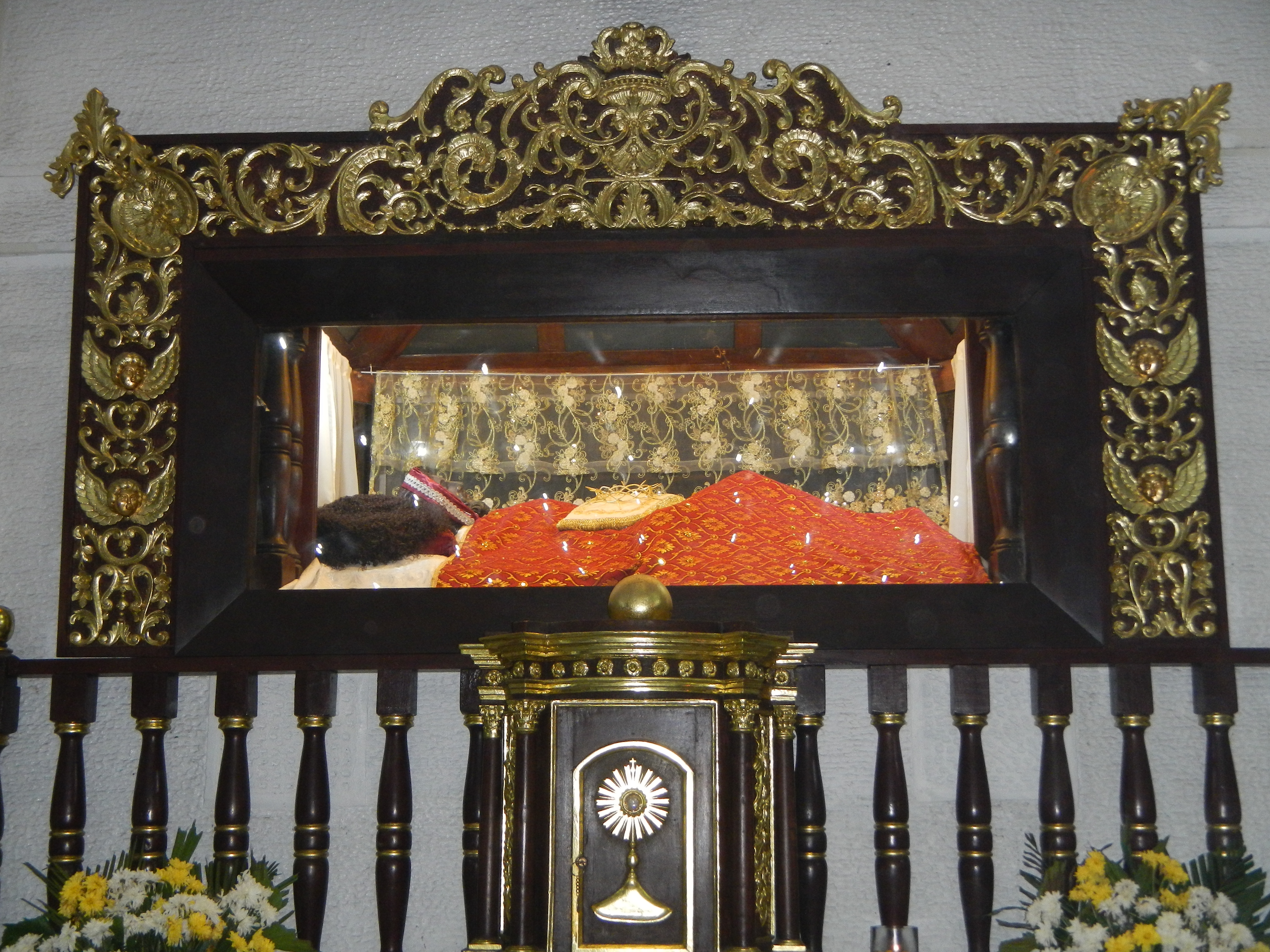
- Apung Mamacalulu inside the shrine

Religion
- Affiliation: Archdiocese of San Fernando
- Ecclesiastical or organisational status: Archdiocesan shrine
- Leadership: Florentino Lavarias
- Year consecrated: 2012

Location
- Location: C. Dayrit St., Barangay Lourdes Sur, Angeles City, Philippines
- Interactive map of Apung Mamacalulu; Archdiocesan Shrine of our Lord Jesus Christ of the Holy Sepulchre; Santuario Arquidiocesano de Nuestro Señor Jesucristo del Santo Sepulcro

Architecture
- Type: Shrine
- Completed: 2012
- Materials: Concrete, mortar, steel, brick

Website
- www.cbcponline.net/sfpampanga/html/parishes.html

Apung Mamacalulu (Merciful Lord, Our Lord of Great Mercy), or the Santo Entierro (Holy Burial), of Angeles City, is a statue depicting the burial of Jesus Christ and is enshrined at the Archdiocesan Shrine of Christ our Lord of the Holy Sepulchre in Lourdes Sur, Angeles City, Philippines. The shrine attracts thousands of devotees and visitors, particularly during the Friday Masses held in honor of the image.

== Origin ==
The tradition of venerating the image of the dead Christ traces its origin to the early Church. The earliest articles of veneration are the Sudarium of Oviedo and the Shroud of Turin, the very shroud believed to have been used in burying the body of the dead Christ. Several representations of the dead Christ became common in the fifteenth century. When Spain introduced Christianity to the Philippines, they brought several representative images of the dead Christ. Known by such names as Santo Sepulcro (Holy Sepulchre), Santo Cristo Yacente (Lying Holy Christ), Santo Retiro (Holy Retirement), Santo Entierro (Holy Burial, Lord of the Holy Sepulchre), the most common portrayal is that of the dead Christ lying in state on a stately bier, a very popular icon in the Philippines.

Fr. Jaime Bulatao, SJ, a noted author on Philippine religious psychology, writes that the Filipinos identify with the suffering of the dead Christ because of poverty and other socio-economic difficulties they experience. Angeles City has widely revered two images of Apung Mamacalulu: one at the Pisamban Maragul and the other at the shrine in Brgy. Lourdes Sur.

== History ==
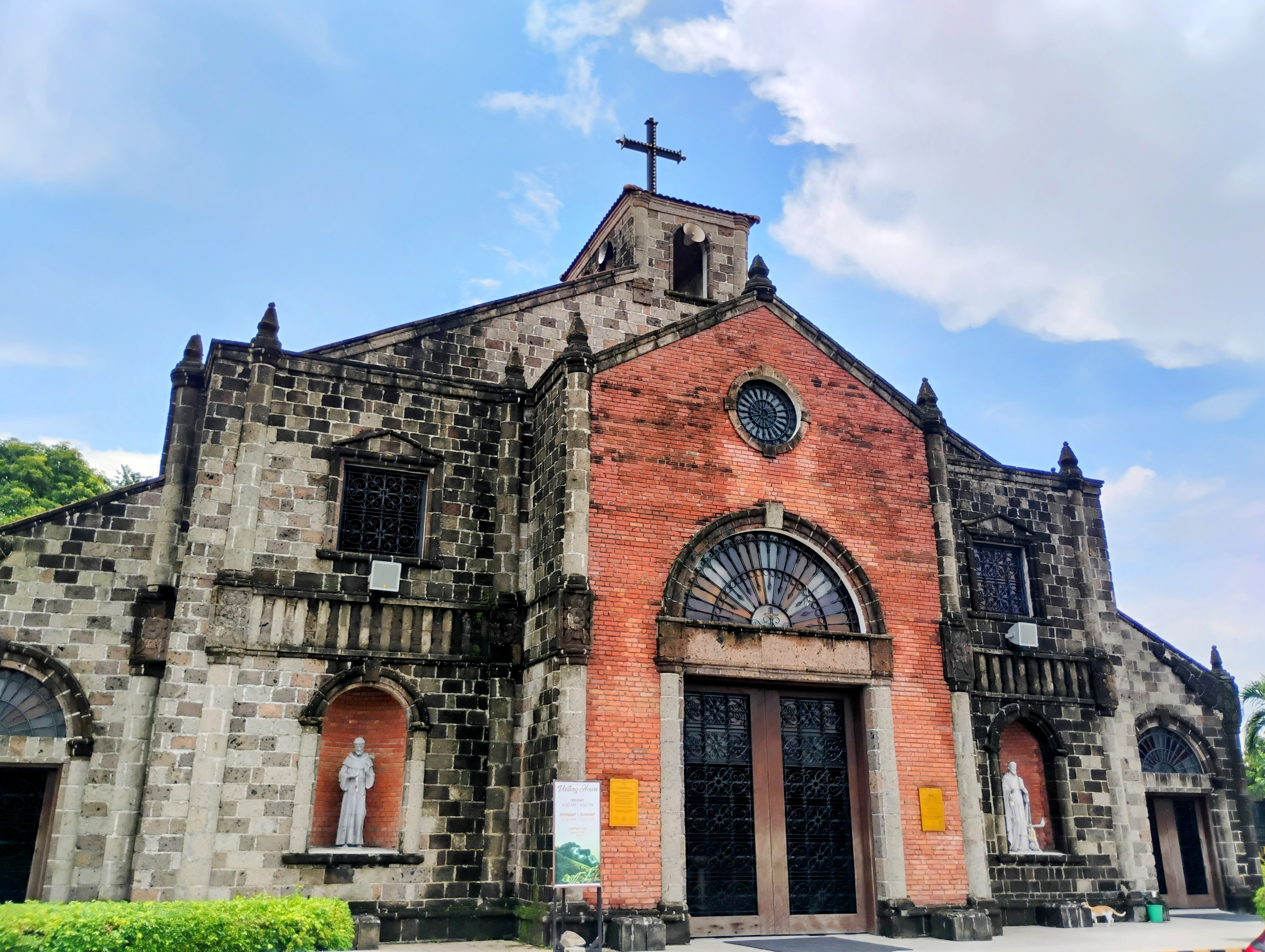
Apung Mamacalulu Shrine

Padre Macario Paras had ordered the creation of the image and then gifted it to the Catholic church.

It was first installed in a little sanctuary built by Padre Paras on his own premises, which may have also been located somewhere within Barrio Lourdes Sur (then known as Talimundoc, within the vast Paras and Dayrit estates) where it became an object of veneration among the pious inhabitants of the place. An entry in the book of records of the Roman Catholic Church of Angeles [marked as exhibit B in G.R. No. 30242] shows that the image, its carriage, and other appendages, appear to have been given as a gift to the church by Padre Paras. There is also a similar entry found in the church records under the date February 20, 1865, where it appears that the Apu image, with its adornments and carriage, was a gift from Padre Paras and was then in his care. Another document shows that the image, together with its carriage, was transferred to the church in 1872.

About 1896 or 1897 during the Philippine Revolution, the image and the carriage were moved and transported to another municipality for safekeeping. Henson writes that during the tumultuous years of the revolution, the image was kept in barrio Sapangbato. It was brought back to the church sometime in 1904, where it remained to this day. The image is taken out on two occasions during procession on Good Friday and during the fiesta held in October.

=== The execution of Román Payumu ===
Around the middle of October 1897, a band of Capampangan revolutionaries staged a raid on the barrio of Talimunduc (now Brgy. Lourdes Sur). They were from the barrio of Tibo, Mabalacat, all on horseback and led by a captain. They entered the Angeles boundary through an area at the foothills of the Zambales Mountains known as Pati by the Aetas, in the Sitio of Mangga, barrio Sapangbato. On their way to Angeles town proper, they passed the barrios of Amsic and Pampang and succeeded in recruiting young men. In the town itself, they crossed through Henson Street and fell upon Talimunduc where a group of young men voluntarily joined the Katipunan organization, firmly believing in the cause of Philippine Revolution that was then converging into Pampanga from the provinces of Bulacan, Bataan, Nueva Ecija and Tarlac.

Upon learning of this Katipunan raid, the Spanish cazadores ("hunters", as the Spanish Army Infantrymen were known then) and local Macabebe guardia civil (civil guards) stationed at the casa tribunal (town hall) sprang into action and rushed to Talimunduc. There they found a number of young men dressed-up in travelling clothes, but the Spaniards were told that the Katipunan band had already fled towards the barrio of Cayapa, about 6 km (3.7 mi) to the southeast. So, a platoon of cazadores and guardia civil rushed to Cayapa in hot pursuit. Meanwhile, the seven dressed-up young men were arrested and their arms tied with rope in miquit-a-sicu fashion (tied elbows meeting at one's back), the Spanish military method of restraining prisoners, that was guaranteed to produce intense and continuous pain at the shoulders, elbows and chest. They were then taken to the town of Baculud (now Bacolor), then the capital of Pampanga, where the provincial jail was located. They were never heard from again to this day, however, two were identified – Cornelio Manalang and Críspulo Punsalan.

The platoon who rushed to Capaya in search of the rebel band found the barrio deserted, the inhabitants having fled for fear of Spanish reprisal. However, in an outlying field, they found a lone farmer tending his baritan, a small field of barit grass (Leersia hexandra) that was sold and fed to calesa (carriage) horses. The farmer was Román Payumu, a humble zacatero, a gatherer and provider of animal feed like grass for horses. Although illiterate and ignorant family man, he was very industrious and a good provider. He was a deeply religious man with an intense faith in God and a very devout Catholic. After selling all his barit grass to carriage drivers in the town marketplace every evening, he made it a point to pray fervently at the Holy Rosary Parish Church in Angeles town proper. When the first ever Quinario devotion, prior to the fall fiesta of Apung Mamacalulu, was instituted on October 23, 1897, he quickly volunteered as a regular cargador (bearer) of the Apu during processions where he was popularly known by his nickname, Duman.

Finding the barrio Capaya completely deserted, the platoon ganged-up on Duman who was brusquely interrogated regarding the Katupunero band that raided Bo. Capaya and the whereabouts of the entire barrio population. The poor Duman, knowing nothing of what transpired in his village as his field was quite far from the village, answered he knew nothing what the soldiers were talking about. Immediately, he was branded a liar and was quickly accused of being a Katipunero himself. The guards took turns in hitting him with their rifle butts on the head, chest and back to force him to talk, but Duman only wept in pain and insisted that he knew nothing. The soldiers continued to beat him up until nothing but blood came out of his mouth, nose and ears. Exasperated, the soldiers tied his elbows in miquit-a-sicu fashion, and with a long rope tied around his neck, the bloodied Duman was taken on foot to the town hall for further interrogation. Once inside the municipal jail, the guards mercilessly beat him up with solid bamboo clubs to extract revolutionary information to no avail. No food or water was given him.

At about noontime on October 25, 1897, the second day of the Quinario devotion, the Capampangan assistant priest, Fr. Vicente Lapus, was sent to Román Payumu by the Spanish parish priest of Angeles, Most Rev. Rufino Santos, O.S.A., to hear his last confession for he was sentenced to death by firing squad that afternoon. Padre Lapus tried his best to console the condemned prisoner and succeeded in enabling him to make a last confession, and to accept his fate with complete resignation to God. Román was fetched by the soldiers at 2 p.m. with elbows tightly tied and was led outside. The small firing squad was composed of the Spanish cazadores lieutenant, a Spanish corporal named Cabo Moreno, and two civil guards.

As a last request, Duman asked the lieutenant if he could pray to Apung Mamacalulu in the church for the last time. His request was granted and the death squad walked to the church, but all its doors were locked for the siesta (the Spanish tradition of early afternoon naptime). The execution ground was behind the church, and beyond were vast sugarcane fields that stretched far up to the town of Porac. Desperate to be saved from execution, innocent as he was, Román decided to pray near the reclining statue of Apung Mamacalulu and the closest he could get was at the last closed door of the church (facing the present Parish Hall). The Spanish lieutenant allowed Duman to kneel down outside this closed door where he tearfully implored the Apu to save him from the firing squad. In an intense and desperate outburst, he cried out:

O Apu cung Manacalulo! Emu cu pu rugu acaquet, pemalu dacu pu at penumbuc. Ala cumang pung bitasang casalanan! Ngeni pu paten dacu pa! O Dios co, balicdan yucu pu careng mata yung mapamacalulu. Ticdo cayu sana pu queng quecayung pañgaquera at lualan yu cu pu!... Cambe yucung caulan matalic at ibalut yucu pu qng quecayung mal a mantu at iligtas yucu pu, at sabe yo pung isambulat dening macamate canacu!

Oh my Merciful Lord! Can’t you see me? They clubbed me and hit me in spite of my innocence! Now they’re even going to kill me! Oh My God, turn your merciful gaze upon me! Please arise from your recline and come out to me! Embrace me tightly and enfold me with your holy robe and save me, and cast away my executioners!

The Spanish and local Macabebe soldiers broke into loud laughter seeing the kneeling Duman in a feverish frenzy of emotion. But unknown to them, Fr. Vicente Lapus was standing right behind the closed church door listening and watching everything through the small cracks. (This was how Payumu's prayer was recorded by Padre Lapus for posterity). The impatient Spanish lieutenant barked: “Puñeta! Todo esto lo que haces es ya de masiado! ¡Levántate!” ("Goddammit! This is all simply getting too much! Stand up!"). Knowing no Spanish, Duman remained kneeling down and was weeping in utter hopelessness feeling abandoned to certain death by the Apu. Without warning, a local soldier grabbed his arm and forcefully pulled him up, yelling: “Puta naida mo! Ticdo na ca canu! Panaca ning alte! (Son of a bitch! Stand up now! You thunderstruck!). Losing his balance, Duman fell to the ground. The guards pulled him up and brusquely pushed him forward to the execution spot, which was the corner church wall before reaching the present sacristy door.

As the condemned man limped forward, he felt that the rope tying his elbows had become loose from the manhandling and had started to drop down! Realizing that his arms had suddenly become free, he quickly decided to run away and darted towards the sugarcane fields right behind the church (now the Holy Angel University campus). The startled executioners seemed paralyzed for a few seconds as Duman dashed away at full speed. The Spaniards were the first to react: they frantically loaded their rifles, aimed at their escaping prisoner who was just barely ten feet away and fired shot after shot. The bewildered Macabebe civil guards followed suit and started firing deadlier calibre .43 bullets at their fellow Capampangan. Considering the tested accuracy of these then world-class rifles of hitting bulls-eye targets at a distance of 200 yards (roughly 600 feet), it was incredible how these well-trained professional officers and soldiers could have missed their target, starting from a distance of only ten feet, and after initially firing a total of about twenty shots at their escaping prisoner.

Some 100 feet inside the dense sugarcane field, Duman fell into a luctun trap, which was full of dried leaves and trash. These were pits – 1 square meter wide and 2 meters deep where young locusts, still without wings called luctun were driven into by groups of peasants during locust infestations, and later cooked into sinigang (sour soup) or candied with muscovado sugar. Duman hid himself at the bottom of the pit and covered his body with the trash. His right heel was bleeding from a minor bullet wound.

A few minutes later, the Spaniards organized a large search party and minutely combed all the sugarcane fields behind the church and even thrust their long bayonets in all of the luctun traps they found. The searchers combed the fields up to the barrio of Siniura, Porac but failed to find Román who, all the while, was hiding only about a hundred feet behind the church building.

By midnight that same evening, he secretly emerged from the pit, covered with red ants, and proceeded to hide in an outlying village where he remained up to June 1898 when the Spanish Army Forces in Pampanga were defeated by the Capampangan Revolutionary Armies of Gen. Maximino Hizon, thus liberating the entire province from Spanish rule since 1572.

From all indications, the circumstances leading to the escape and salvation of Román Payumu from certain death cannot be scientifically explained by human reason alone. Although the events were of this world and involved humans, certain inexplicable aspects appear to have mysteriously lingered within some of the events themselves that were undeniably out of this world, hence impossible to explain in physical terms. It was in these “out-worldly realms” of said events that those who knew of the mysterious salvation of Román Payumu from certain death presented no alternative but to accept wholeheartedly Payumu's own personal but downright simple explanation to the said phenomenon: The Divine Intervention of the sacred Apung Mamacalulu.

Duman returned to his old zacatero livelihood and remained an ever loyal bearer of Apung Mamacalulu till his old age and his natural death. The story of Román Payumu's salvation from a firing squad and subsequent search became the basis of Angeles City's “Fiesta nang Apu” celebrations every last Friday of October, starting from the first Apu Fiesta on October 28, 1897. At the same time, his story spread not only in Pampanga but throughout Central Luzon and started the popular devotion to Apung Mamacalulu for millions of devotees up to the present time, many of whom truthfully attest to innumerable personal petitions and favors granted by the Apu.

=== The 1928 controversy ===
When the image was carried out in procession on Good Friday of 1928, its camarero (caretaker) Eriberto Navarro, acting for his aunt Álvara Fajardo [an heiress to the Paras estate], and with the assistance of numerous other persons [among them several policemen and then town Mayor Juan D. Nepomuceno], caused the image to be taken forcibly from the precincts of the church when the procession was over, and from there it was carried to a place that had been constructed for its deposit. Renato “Katoks” Tayag, author of The Sinners of Angeles, adds a colorful note to the 1928 incident, as recounted to him by a certain Atty. Ricardo Canlas of San Fernando: it is said that the snatching fiasco resulted not only from an ownership dispute but also from a long-standing political quarrel between the then Nacionalistas and Democratas. This incident gave rise to the 1929 replevin suit [a civil action to recover personality] G.R. No. 30242 filed on March 25, 1929, with the Supreme Court, entitled The Roman Catholic Archbishop of Manila vs. Álvara Fajardo and Eriberto Navarro.

The ponente Associate Justice Street wrote:

The claim put forth by Alvara Fajardo has its origin in the following facts: Padre Paras died about the year 1876, leaving a will in which he instituted his nephew, Mariano V. Henson, as his universal heir, and he is supposed to have inherited the image from Padre Paras. From Henson the image passed by transfer, so it is claimed, to Fernanda Sanchez, and from her to her son, Crispulo Bundoc, and his wife, the defendant Alvara Fajardo. Crispulo Bundoc is now dead, leaving Alvara Fajardo as the only claimant to the image by virtue of alleged title derived along the line indicated. But the entries in the inventory of properties of the church to which we have referred above show that before his death Padre Paras had given the image to the church or at least that the church was holding it under claim of such gift. It therefore did not pass with other property of Paras to Henson as a result of the will made by Paras in which Henson was instituted as universal heir. More than this, the transfer of the property from Henson to Fernanda Sanchez is not proved by satisfactory testimony. What is proved is that after the death of Padre Paras, Fernanda Sanchez exercised the office of recamadera (caretaker) of the image, and this office finally passed to Alvara Fajardo, one of the defendants in this case. The church authorities seem never to have questioned, prior to the institution of this action, the right of Alvara Fajardo to this office. It appears to be the duty of the recamadera to keep the image and its carriage in proper condition and to supply proper apparel for it, – all of which is done with money supplied by contributions of the pious. In addition to this, it is the duty of the person filling said office to collect alms with which to pay for the religious services incident to the celebrations devoted to the saint. As a result of these duties, the person filling such office apparently has a right of free access to the image. We conclude from the evidence that the right pertaining to Alvara Fajardo as recamadera does not carry with it the ownership of the image or the carriage; and the church, having had possession of the image, under claim of ownership by gift, for a long period of time, the title of the Archbishop thereto is perfect. Judgment will therefore be entered for the plaintiff to recover of the defendants the image and carriage which are the subject of this action; and a writ for the delivery of the same to the plaintiff will accordingly issue from this court in due course. So ordered, without costs.

== Prayer to Apung Mamacalulu ==
A prayer written by the parish priest and auxiliary bishop of the city of San Fernando, Most Rev. Pablo Virgilio S. David, D.D. S.Th.D.

=== Kapampangan version ===
Panalangin kang Apung Mamacalulu

Lalapit cu Keca o Apung Mamacalulu,
cambe ning beyatan ning caladua cu,
cambe ring lingasngas at pigagap cu,
cambe ring capagsubucan a árapan cu,
cambe ring bage liligalig king pusu at caisipan cu,
cambe ring pamangailangan da reng taung caluguran cu,
cambe ring pamicasala’t keinan cu,
cambe ning mabule cung casalpantayanan,
cambe ning matbud cung capanaligan,
cambe ning dimut cung lugud.
Lalapit cu Keca nung macananung lepitan na Ca nitang babaing cayayagasan daya,
ban calupa na, atagkil ke agyang ing laylayan na mu ning imalan Mu at cumayap cu.

Lalapit cu Keca nung macananung lepitan na Ca nitang taung maki-ketung,
ban tagkilan mu cu’t pacayapan,
ban linisan mu cu caladua’t catawan,
ban dinan mu cung bayung bie at parasan.

Lalápit cu la naman Keca deng pacamalan cu king bie.
Calupa da retang taung memitbit ketang paralitiku at memusbus king bubungan
ban iculdas de at ilapit Keca itang cacaluguran dang ating capansanan,
Acu man pu Ginu buri co sang ilapit Keca deng caluguran cu king bie
ban ila man damdaman do ring amanu Mung macapasno
at ban ing upaya ning calam Mu munie bayung sicanan
caring tud dang mangalgal at maybug dang masira lub,
ban ena la mitakid pasibayu o malili king paglacad da.

Lalapit cu Keca o Apung Mamacalulu,
nung macananu na cang lepitan nitang babaing Cananea,
a megmacalunus alang-alang king másakit a anac na,
at menalig king degulan ning pusu Mu,
ning lunus Mu at masabal careng alang acarapat.
Kalupa na, lalapit cung anting asung manenaya king pamangan
a mababalag ibat king lamesa ning cayang amu.

Lalapit cu Keca, calupa na nitang babaing micasala
a ume da nang basibasan detang taung mapanusga,
uling balu cung mapaglunus ca at
Ica mung bucud ing macapangatmu king sablang caculangan cu,
ca mung bucud ing macapanacap king camarinayan cu,
Ica mung bucud ing macapibangun canacu ibat king pangalugmuc cu.

Lalapit cu Keca, calupa nang San Pedro
iniang pepakit Ca keya at maibug yang lumbug king dine na,
iniang inagcat meng mangan at mipasiag pasibayu king lugud na,
sumangid ning gewa nang pamaglingad Keca.

Lalapit cu Keca, antimo retang alagad king Emaus,
ban calupa da, acayabe da Ca king paglakad cu,
atalastas cu ing sablang mangapalyari king bie cu,
at ban capamilatan ding banal Mung amanu
ing pusu cung dirimla at daralumdum micapali ya at miyaslagan-sala,
at ban akilala da Ca potang casulu da Ca
at mirinan cung sicanan-lub marap pasibayu careng bage tatacasan cu.

Susúcu cu Keca, O Apung Mamacalulu, ing sablang canacu,
uling ica mung bucud ing Ginu cu at Dios ning bie cu
Icang mabibie at mag-ari cambe ning Ibpa at ning Espiritu Santo,
mangga man king alang angga. Amen.

=== English version ===
Prayer to Apung Mamacalulu

I come to You, o Apung Mamacalulu
with all that weighs down my soul,
with all my worries and anxieties,
with all the trials that confront me,
with all that troubles my heart and my mind,
with all the needs of the people I love,
with all my sins and weaknesses,
with my frail faith,
with my wavering trust,
with my imperfect love.

I come to You like the woman who had been bleeding for years
so that like her, I, too, would be cured by just touching
the hem of Your garment.

I come to You like that leper who begged for Your mercy
so that You would touch me and heal me,
so that You would cleanse my soul and my body,
so that You would grant me a new life and new sense of purpose.

I come to You to commend my loved ones to Your care
like the people who brought their paralytic friend before You
so that he could be touched by You. I too, dear Lord
am longing to bring my loved ones closer to You
so that they too would get the chance to hear Your comforting words,
so that by the power of Your grace
their wobbly knees and drooping spirits would regain strength,
so that they would not falter and fall or lose their way again.

I come to You o Apung Mamacalulu
like the Canaanite woman,
who pleaded and begged in behalf of her sick daughter and
believed in the goodness of Your heart and
in Your infinite mercy and compassion for the helpless.
Like her, I count on Your grace like a dog waiting for scraps to
fall from the master’s table.

I come to You like the woman accused of adultery,
who was bound to be stoned by the self-righteous,
because I know that You are merciful,
and that You alone can forgive my shortcomings,
You alone can shield me from shame,
And You alone can lift me up.

I come to You like St. Peter
when You appeared to him and he almost drowned in shame,
when You invited him to break bread with you
so that he could reaffirm his love for You,
despite his repeated denials of ever knowing you at the hour of Your trial.

I come to You, like the disciples on their way to Emmaus
so that like them, I, too, could walk with You
and find enlightenment along the way,
so that through Your divine words
my heart, grown cold and numb and shrouded in darkness,
would be set aflame and find light in your love,
so that I would sense and appreciate Your presence in our midst
and find the strength to confront the realities that I have always been avoiding.

I surrender everything to You, O Apung Mamacalulu –
all that I have and all that I am
because You alone are my Lord and my God,
You who live and reign with the Father and the Holy Spirit
forever and ever. Amen.

== Image gallery ==
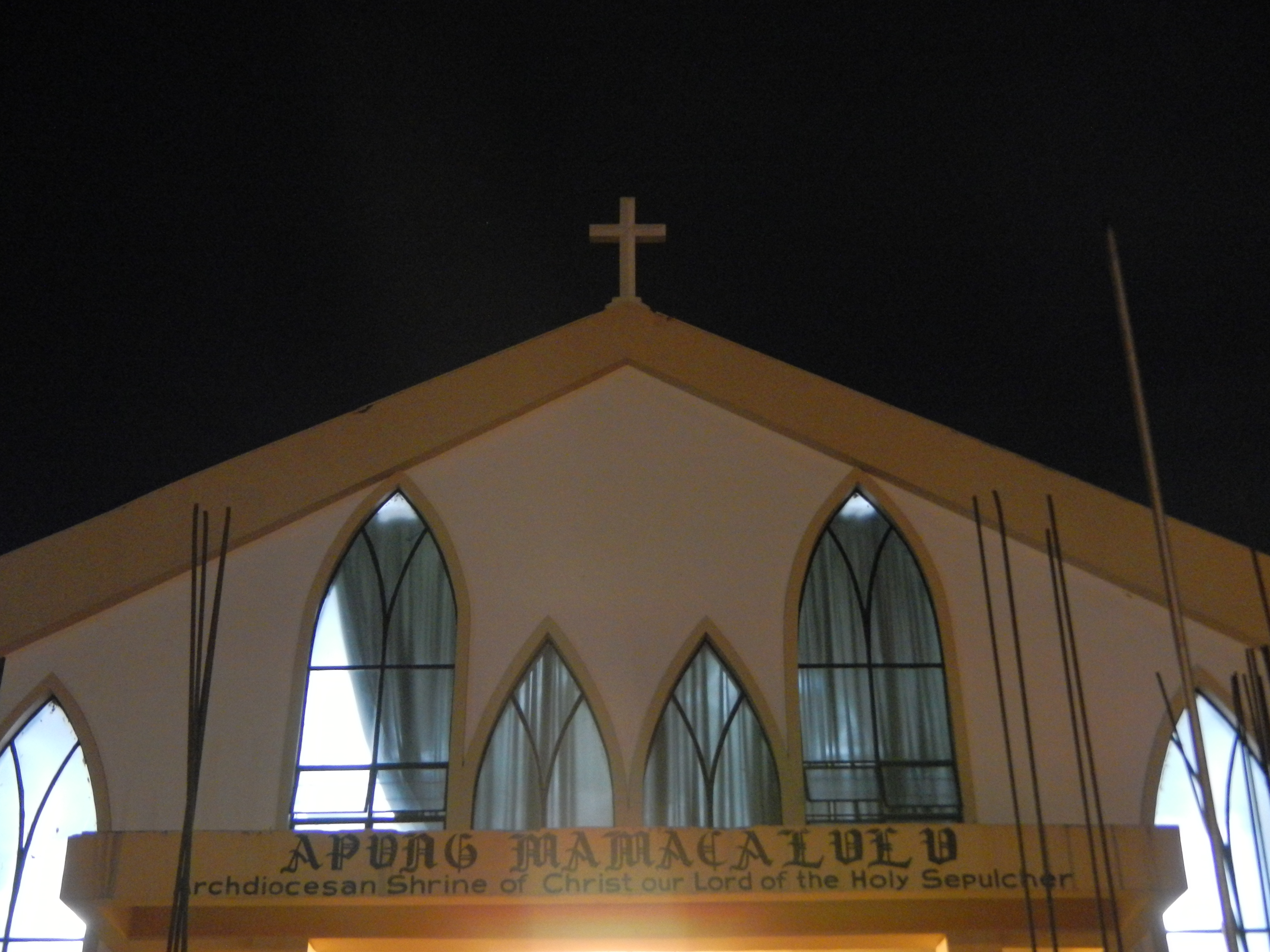
The old upper facade of the Shrine of Christ our Lord of the Holy Sepulcher

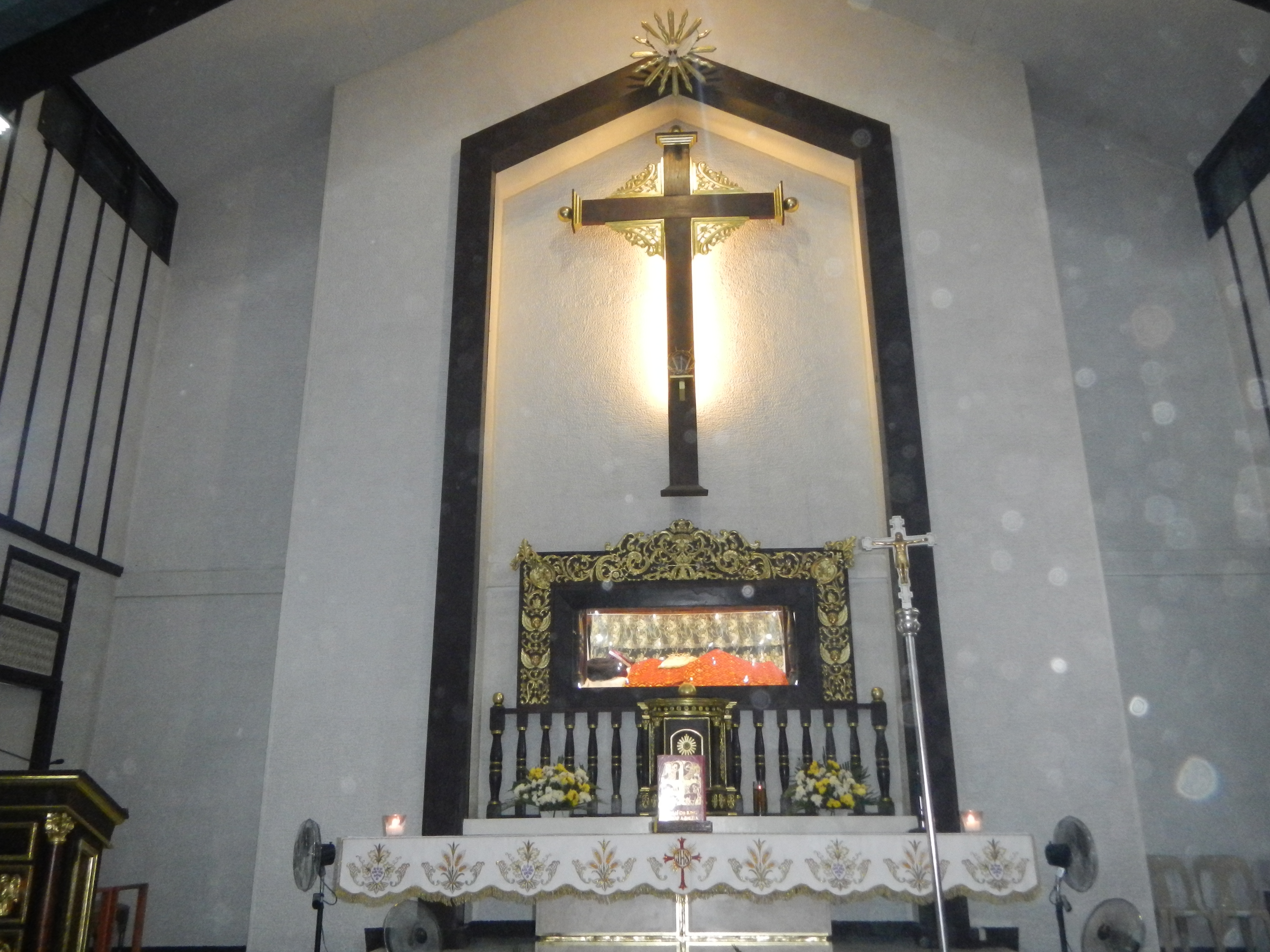
The main altar of the shrine

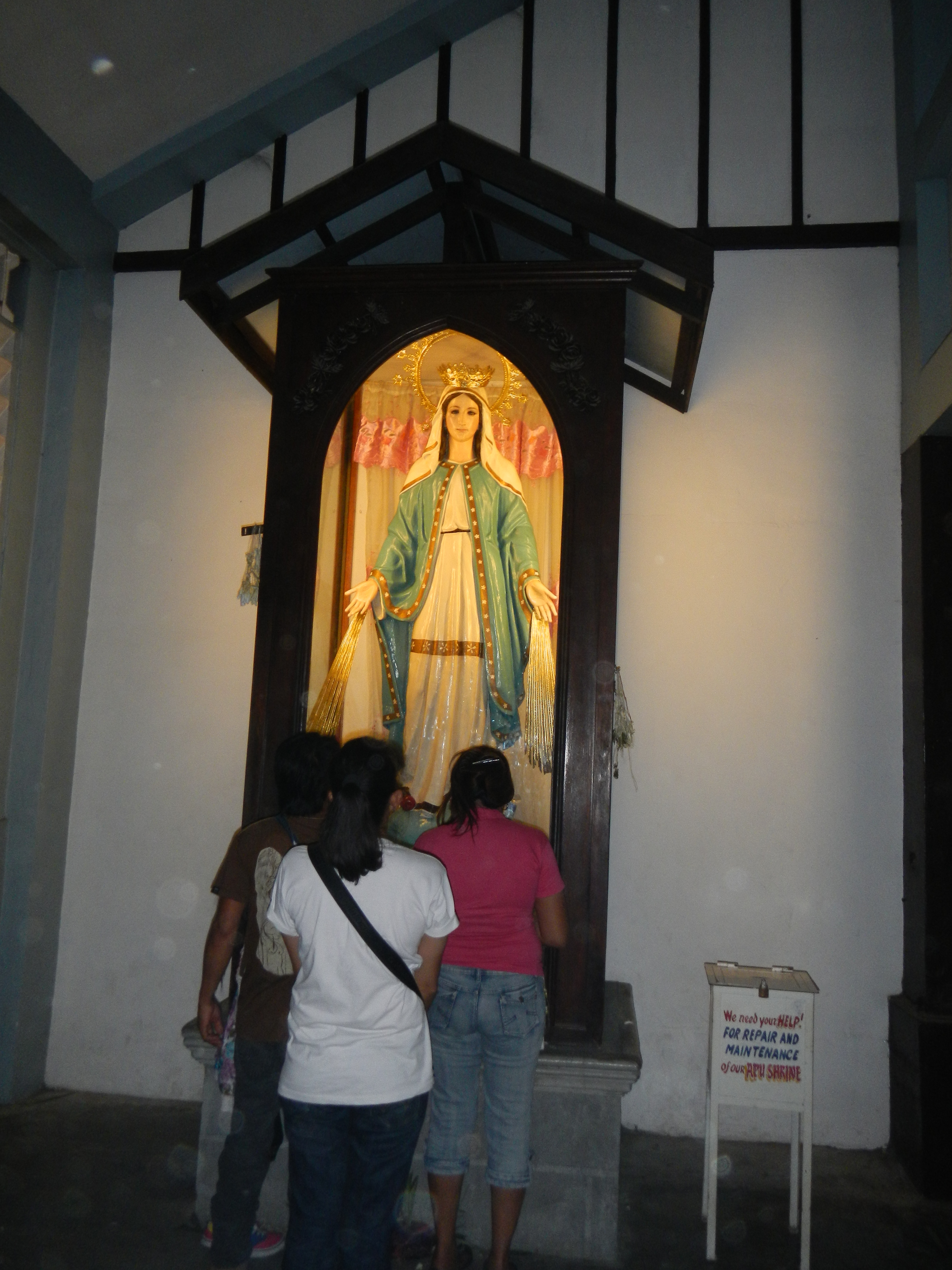
Side altar of Our Lady of the Miraculous Medal

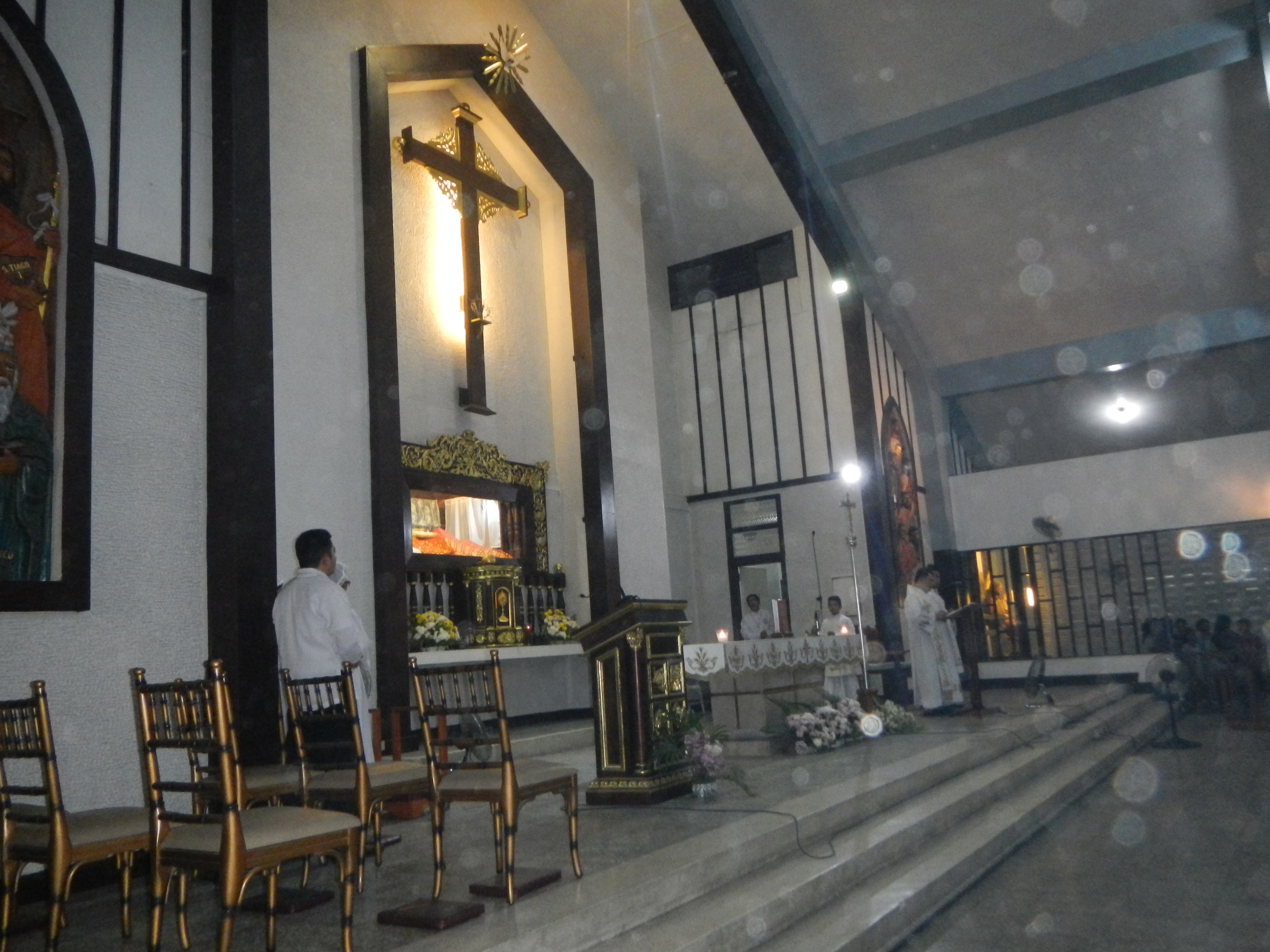
Priest during a Friday Mass

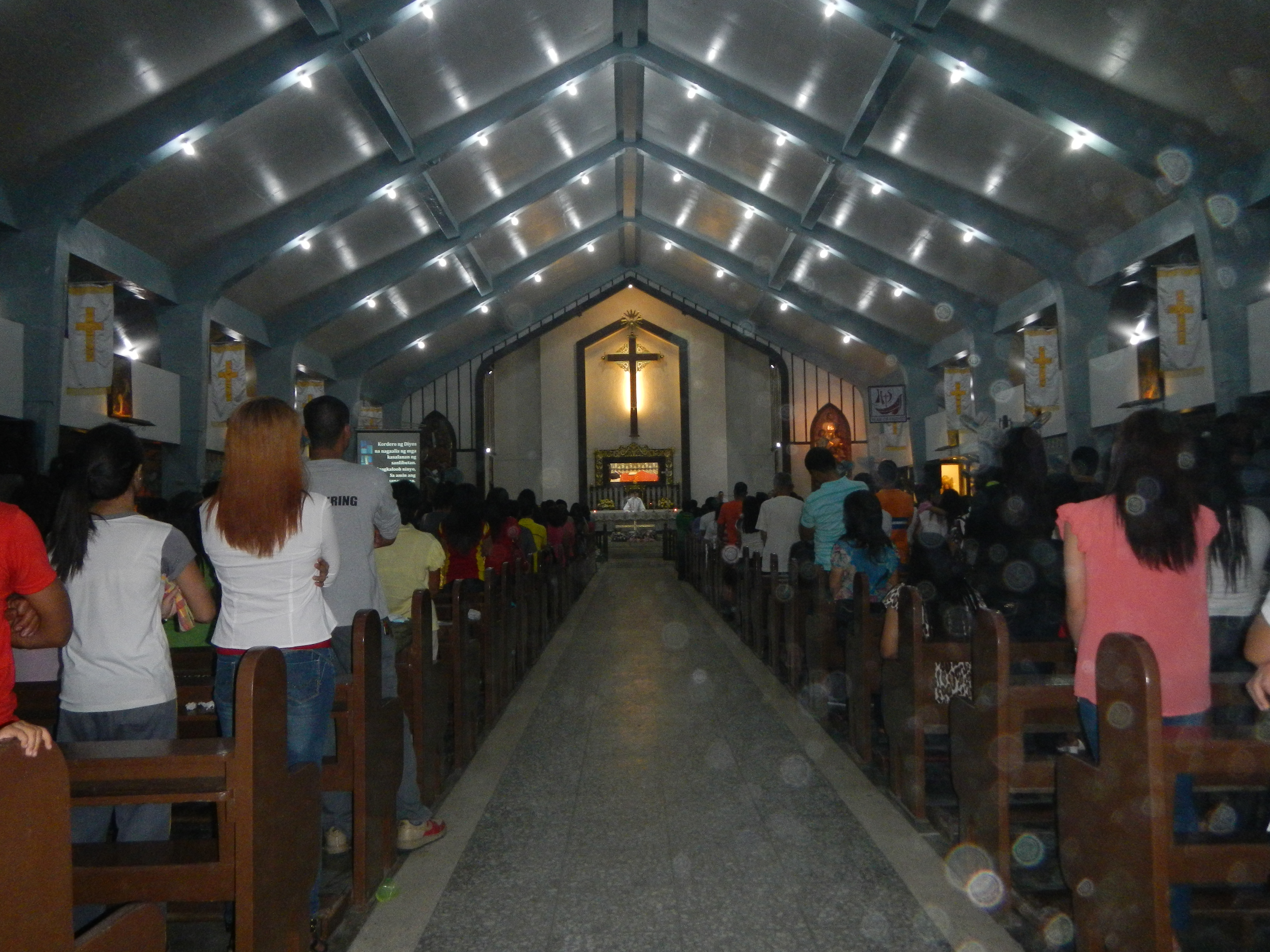
Parishioners on a Friday Mass

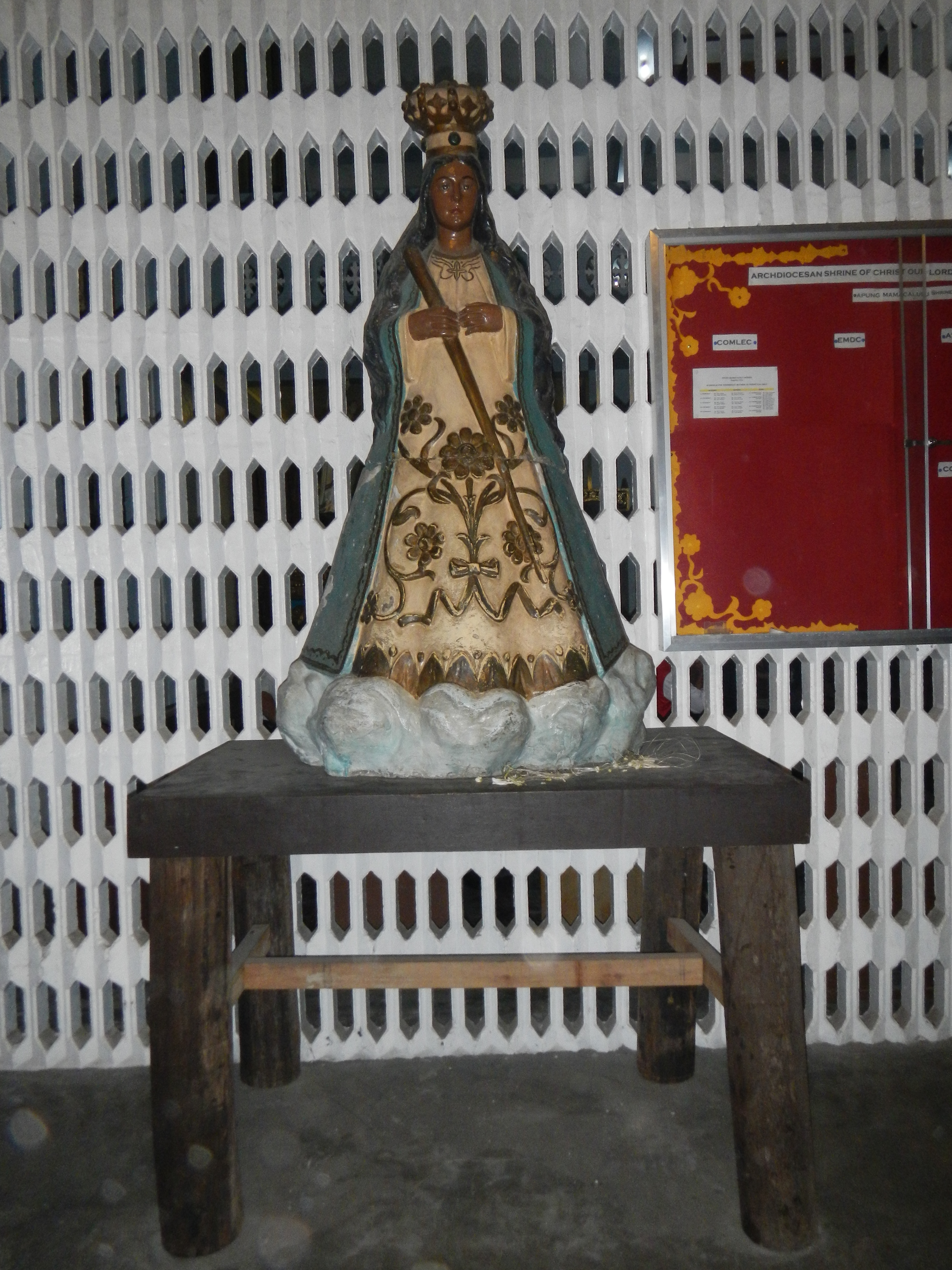
Our Lady of Poon Bato image
