= Roman Catholic Diocese of Guardialfiera =

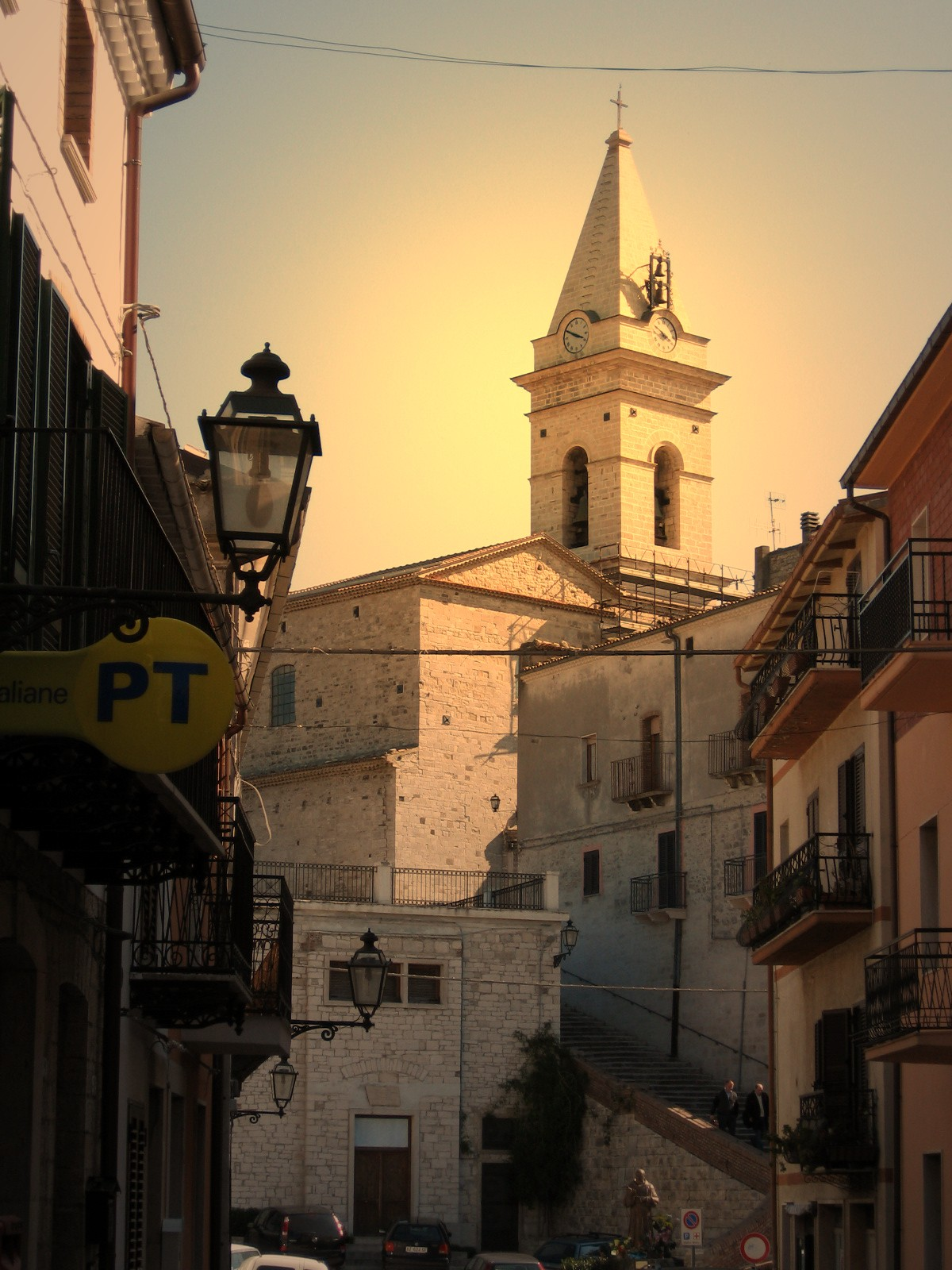
Santa Maria Dall'Assunta Cathedral, Guardialfiera

The Diocese of Guardialfiera (Latin Dioecesis Guardiensis Alpheriae) or Diocese of Guardia was a Roman Catholic diocese in Italy. The diocese was established in the second half of the 11th century, with seat of the diocese was located in the city of Guardialfiera in the Province of Campobasso in the region of Molise. In 1818, the diocese was suppressed, and its ecclesiastical territory was assigned to the Diocese of Termoli.

It has been a titular see since 1968.

== History ==
The earliest known bishop of Guardia was Petrus, who is first recorded in 1071. The diocese is first named in the confirmation of the privileges of the archbishops of Benevento made by Pope Anastasius IV on 22 September 1153, in which the suffragans of the metropolitan are listed.

=== After the French ===
Following the extinction of the Napoleonic Kingdom of Italy, the Congress of Vienna authorized the restoration of the Papal States and the Kingdom of Naples. Since the French occupation had seen the abolition of many Church institutions in the Kingdom, as well as the confiscation of much Church property and resources, it was imperative that Pope Pius VII and King Ferdinand IV reach agreement on restoration and restitution. Ferdinand demanded the suppression of fifty dioceses.

A concordat was finally signed on 16 February 1818, and ratified by Pius VII on 25 February 1818. Ferdinand issued the concordat as a law on 21 March 1818. On 27 June 1818, Pius VII issued the bull De Ulteriore, in which the ecclesiastical province of Benevento was restored, including it suffragans, among them the diocese of Termoli. The decision was also made to suppress permanently the diocese of Guardialfiera, and to incorporate its territory into the diocese of Termoli.

=== Titular see ===
In 1968, the title of "Bishop of Guardialfiera" (though not the diocese itself) was restored as the Titular Episcopal See of Guardialfiera. On 28 April 1969, Pope Paul VI announced a large number of appointments, including that of a titular bishop of Guardialfiera, Bishop Ramón Sanahuja y Marcé.

== Bishops of Guardialfiera ==
=== to 1400 ===
...

- Petrus (attested 1071–1075)

...

- Alasius (attested 1177 – 1179)

...

- Gibertus (attested 1226)

...

- Sinibaldus (attested 1304–1322)

[Giovanni, O.F.M. (1311)]
...

- Matthaeus (d. 1348)
- Joannes de Mailhaco, O.Min. (1348 – 1350)
- Benedictus (1350 – 1353)
- Petrus (1354)
- Petrus, O. Min. (1354 – 1361)
- Antonius de Peccorano, O.Min. (1361 – 1392?)
- Antonius de Rocci (Rossi) (1392 – 1399) Roman Obedience
- Jacobus (1399 – 1402) Roman Obedience

=== 1400 to 1600 ===
- Antonius (1402 – 1404)
- Thomasius (1404 –1419) Roman Obedience
- Savinus de Cellino, O.Min. (1404 – 1424) Avignon Obedience
- Jacobus de Castellucio (1425 – 1470?)
- Petrus de Guardia (Campiclari), O.Min. (1470 –1484)
- Antonio Clemente (1484 – 1490)
- Marco Cybo (1490 – 1494)
- Roberto Gerardi, O.P. (1494 – 1498)
- Troilo Agnesi (4 Jul 1498 – 1502)
- Opizinus de Gallis (1503 – 1510)
- Marco Antonio Vascheri (1510 – )
- Zacharias Ferrari, O. Carm. (5 Sep 1519 – Nov 1519 Resigned)
- Valentinus de Valentiuis (2 Dec 1519 – )
- Zacharias Ferrari, O. Carm. (1521 – 1524 Died)
- Girolamo Vascheri, O.F.M. (19 Sep 1524 – 1533 Resigned)
- Marco Antonio Marzolinus (27 Aug 1533 – 1543 Died)
- Giovanni Battista de Lisulis (1543 – 1548)
- Juan Cordella (22 Mar 1548 – 1552 Died)
- Antonio Benedetti (12 Sep 1552 – 1556 Died)
- Giacomo Lomellino del Canto (21 Jun 1557 – 17 Apr 1562 Appointed, Bishop of Mazara del Vallo)
- Giovanni Battista Lomellino (17 Apr 1562 – 17 Mar 1567 Appointed, Bishop of Isernia)
- Carlo Carafa (23 May 1567 – 1572)
- Alticotius de Alticotiis (13 Aug 1572 – 1575 Died)
- Francesco Indelli (14 Oct 1575 – 1580 Died)
- Pompilio Perotti (4 May 1580 – 1591 Died)
- Bartolomeo Beccari (bishop), O.F.M. Conv. (26 Apr 1591 – 1614 Died)

=== 1600 to 1818 ===
- Sebastiano Rinaldi (1616)
- Giovanni Dominico Giaconi (9 Jan 1617 – 1624)
- Alexander Liparuli (15 Apr 1624 – 1637)
- Giovanni Lucas Moncalvi (16 Jan 1640 – 9 Jun 1669 Died)
- Jacobus Pedicini, C.R.M. (19 Aug 1669 – 1 Dec 1688 Died)
- Fabrizio Cianci (28 Nov 1689 – Oct 1696 Died)
- Filippo de Cordova (de' duchi di Suessa) (27 Mar 1697 – 1698 Died)
- Sebastiano Feoli (19 Dec 1698 – 6 Nov 1701 Died)
- Gian Andrea Moscarelli (14 May 1703 – Jan 1724 Died)
- Pietro Abbondio Battiloro (12 Jun 1724 – 18 Dec 1733 Appointed, Bishop of Alife)
- Diomedes Bianconi (15 Feb 1734 – 29 Oct 1734 Died)
- Paschalis Zaini (26 Jan 1735 – 15 Feb 1756 Died)
- Honuphrius del Tufo (24 May 1756 – 28 Jul 1775 Died)
- Francesco de Lauria (13 Nov 1775 – 1796 Died)
- Filippo Speranza (29 Jan 1798 – 1804)

Sede vacante (1804 – 1818)

== See also ==
- List of Catholic dioceses in Italy
- Catholic Church in Italy

== Books ==
=== Reference works ===
- Gams, Pius Bonifatius (1873). Series episcoporum Ecclesiae catholicae (in Latin). Ratisbon: Typis et Sumptibus Georgii Josephi Manz. pp. 884–885.
- Eubel, Conradus, ed. (1913). Hierarchia catholica (in Latin). Vol. I (second ed.). Münster: Libreria Regensbergiana.
- Eubel, Conradus, ed. (1914). Hierarchia catholica (in Latin). Vol. II (second ed.). Münster: Libreria Regensbergiana.
- Eubel, Conradus; Gulik, Guilelmus (1923). Hierarchia catholica (in Latin). Vol. III (second ed.). Münster: Libreria Regensbergiana.
- Gauchat, Patritius (Patrice) (1935). Hierarchia catholica (in Latin). Vol. IV (1592-1667). Münster: Libraria Regensbergiana.
- Ritzler, Remigius; Sefrin, Pirminus (1952). Hierarchia catholica medii et recentis aevi (in Latin). Vol. V (1667-1730). Patavii: Messagero di S. Antonio.
- Ritzler, Remigius; Sefrin, Pirminus (1958). Hierarchia catholica medii et recentis aevi (in Latin). Vol. VI (1730-1799). Patavii: Messagero di S. Antonio.

=== Studies ===
- Cappelletti, Giuseppe (1864). Le chiese d'Italia: dalla loro origine sino ai nostri giorni (in Italian). Vol. XIX. Venezia: G. Antonelli. pp. 358–363.
- Caruso, Antonietta A. (2005). Frammenti di memoria. L'antica cattedrale di Guardialfiera. (in Italian). Cantieri Creativi, 2005.
- D'Avino, Vincenzo (1848). Cenni storici sulle chiese arcivescovili, vescovili, e prelatizie (nulluis) del Regno delle Due Sicilie (in Italian). Napoli: Ranucci. pp. 670–671.
- Magliano, Alberto (1895). Larino: considerazioni storiche sulla città di Larino Volume 1. Campobasso: Colitti 1895. [Ch. VII: Di Guardialfiera anticamente cività vescovile, pp. 339–350]
- Ughelli, Ferdinando; Coleti, Nicolaus (1721). Italia sacra, sive de episcopis Italiae, et insularum adjacentium (in Latin). Vol. Tomus octavus (8). Venezia: Apud Sebastianum Coleti. pp. 296–302.
