= Antonio Benedetti (1715–1788) =

Antonio Benedetti (9 March 1715 – 1788) was an Italian scholar, antiquarian, and professor of classic Greco-Roman literature.

For many years, he was professor of rhetoric at the Jesuit college in Rome. He published an annotated edition of Plautus in Latin (Rome, 1754). He also published a treatise titled Dissertazione su le medaglie greche, non ancora descritte dagli antiquarii (1777) with notes from the Abbot Oderico of Genoa.
