= San Fernando Cathedral (Pampanga) =

Roman Catholic church in Pampanga, Philippines

Metropolitan Cathedral of San Fernando
- Metropolitan Cathedral of San Fernando
- Kalakhang Katedral ni San Fernando (Filipino); Catedral Metropolitana de San Fernando (Spanish)
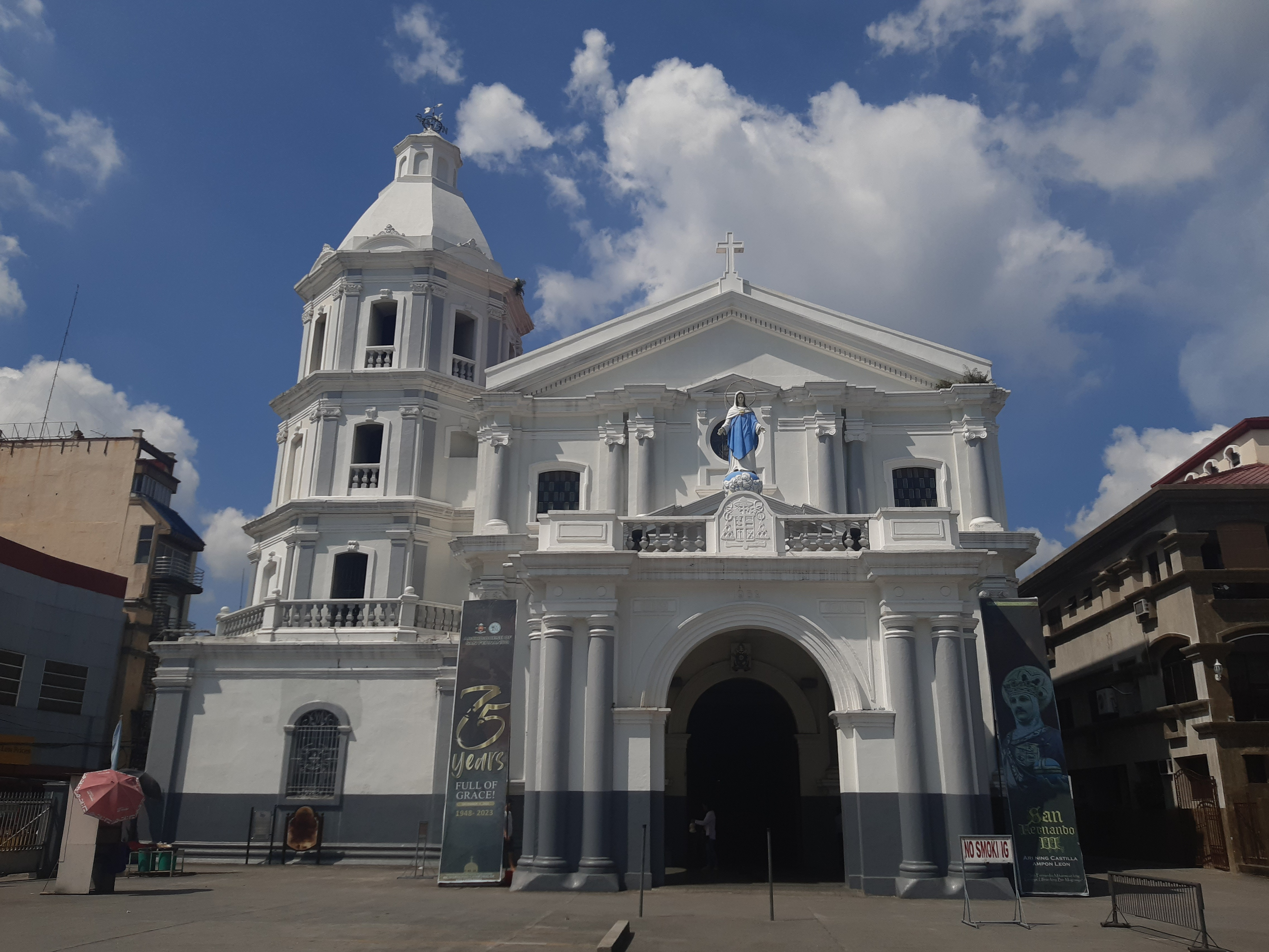
- Cathedral facade in 2024

- Location in Luzon Location in the Philippines
- 15°01′42″N 120°41′35″E
- Location: City of San Fernando, Pampanga
- Country: Philippines
- Denomination: Catholic

History
- Former name: Cathedral of the Assumption
- Status: Metropolitan Cathedral
- Founded: 1754
- Founder: Fray Sebastian Moreno OSA
- Dedication: St. Ferdinand III of Castile
- Dedicated: Rededicated on December 12, 1998

Architecture
- Functional status: Active
- Architect: Fernando Ocampo
- Architectural type: Church building
- Style: Neoclassical
- Groundbreaking: 1754
- Completed: 1948 (Present church)

Specifications
- Capacity: 2000
- Length: 70 m (230 ft)
- Width: 13 m (43 ft)
- Height: 11 m (36 ft)
- Materials: Adobe

Administration
- Province: San Fernando
- Metropolis: San Fernando
- Archdiocese: San Fernando

Clergy
- Archbishop: Florentino Galang Lavarias
- Rector: Rev. Fr. Joselito Henson
- Vicar: Rev. Fr. Joed Mutuc

The Metropolitan Cathedral of San Fernando, formerly known as the Cathedral of Our Lady of the Assumption, is a neo-classical Roman Catholic church in the City of San Fernando, in Pampanga province of the Philippines. It is the seat of the Archdiocese of San Fernando.

== History ==
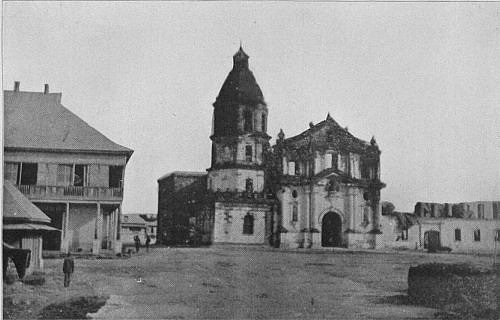
The burnt ruins of the San Fernando Church in 1899

In 1755 the first structure of wood and thatch was built on this site by the Augustinian friars under the patronage of San Fernando III, King of Castile. Fray Sebastian Moreno, O.S.A. was its first cura parroco. On October 17, 1757, townsfolk petitioned the governor-general for exemptions from tribute to enable them to build the church and convent.

It was transferred to the care of secular priests in 1788. The construction of the present style church started during the same year under the supervision Fr. Manuel Canlas, its first secular parish priest, and a committee composed of the principales of the town. They were led by gobernadorcillo Bernabe Pamintuan. Construction was completed in 1808. The church was rededicated to the Assumption of Our Lady.

The church measures 70 metres (230 ft). long, 13 metres (43 ft). wide and 11 metres (36 ft) high. The round dome rising from the rotunda of the transept is reminiscent of the Baroque style with some Renaissance elements.

President Emilio Aguinaldo and his cabinet viewed the Philippine Revolutionary Army from the windows of the convent on October 9, 1898. On orders of General Antonio Luna, the Philippine Revolutionary Army burned the church and convent, as well as most of their records, on May 4, 1899 during the Philippine-American war.

=== 20th century ===
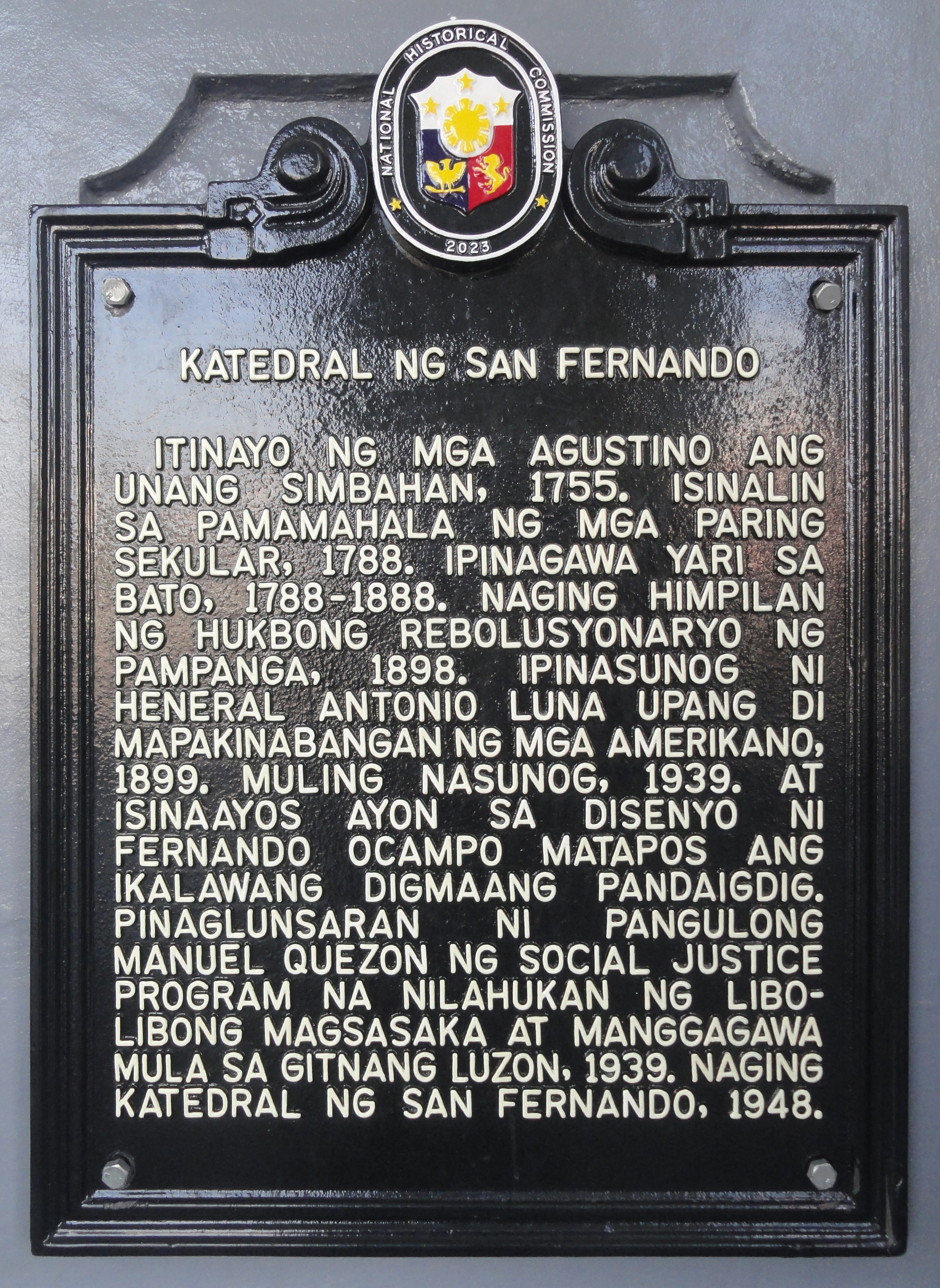
Church NHC historical marker installed in 2023

The church was destroyed by fire again in 1939, and restored by Kapampangan architect Fernando H. Ocampo in 1948.

In 1948 the church was elevated to Cathedral when it became the seat of the Diocese of San Fernando, canonically created by Pope Pius XII.

In 1975, the diocese was elevated by Pope Paul VI, to Archdiocese of San Fernando. Its first bishop was Monsignor Cesar Ma. Guerrero, D.D. He was followed by the Most Reverend Emilio A. Cinense, D.D., who became its first archbishop. He was succeeded by the Most Reverend Oscar V. Cruz, D.D. in 1978. The third archbishop of San Fernando is the Most Reverend Paciano B. Aniceto, D.D. Pamp, and the current is Most Rev. Florentino Lavarias, D.D.

== Rectors ==
- Very Rev. Msgr. Prudencio David, VG: 1918–1952
- Very Rev. Msgr. Bartolome Zabala: 1952–1958
- Very Rev. Msgr. Pedro Puno, VG: 1958–1969
- Very Rev. Msgr. Diosdado Victorio, VG: 1969–1974
- Very Rev. Msgr. Serafin Ocampo: 1974–1981
- Very Rev. Msgr. Jesus Galang: 1981–1992
- Most Rev. Paciano Aniceto, D.D.: 1992–1995
- Very Rev. Msgr. Eugenio Mercado, VF: 1995–2002
- Very Rev. Msgr. Cenovio Lumanog, VG: 2002–2007
- Very Rev. Msgr. Ricardo Jesus Serrano, SLD, PC: 2007–2013
- Very Rev. Msgr. Eugenio Reyes, JCD, PA: 2013–2018
- Rev. Fr. Ricarthy D. Macalino: 2018–2019
- Rev. Fr. Marius Roque: 2019–2021
- Very. Rev. Msgr. Manuel C. Sta Maria, PC: 2021–2025
- Rev. Fr. Joselito C. Henson, SThD: 2025-present

== Gallery ==
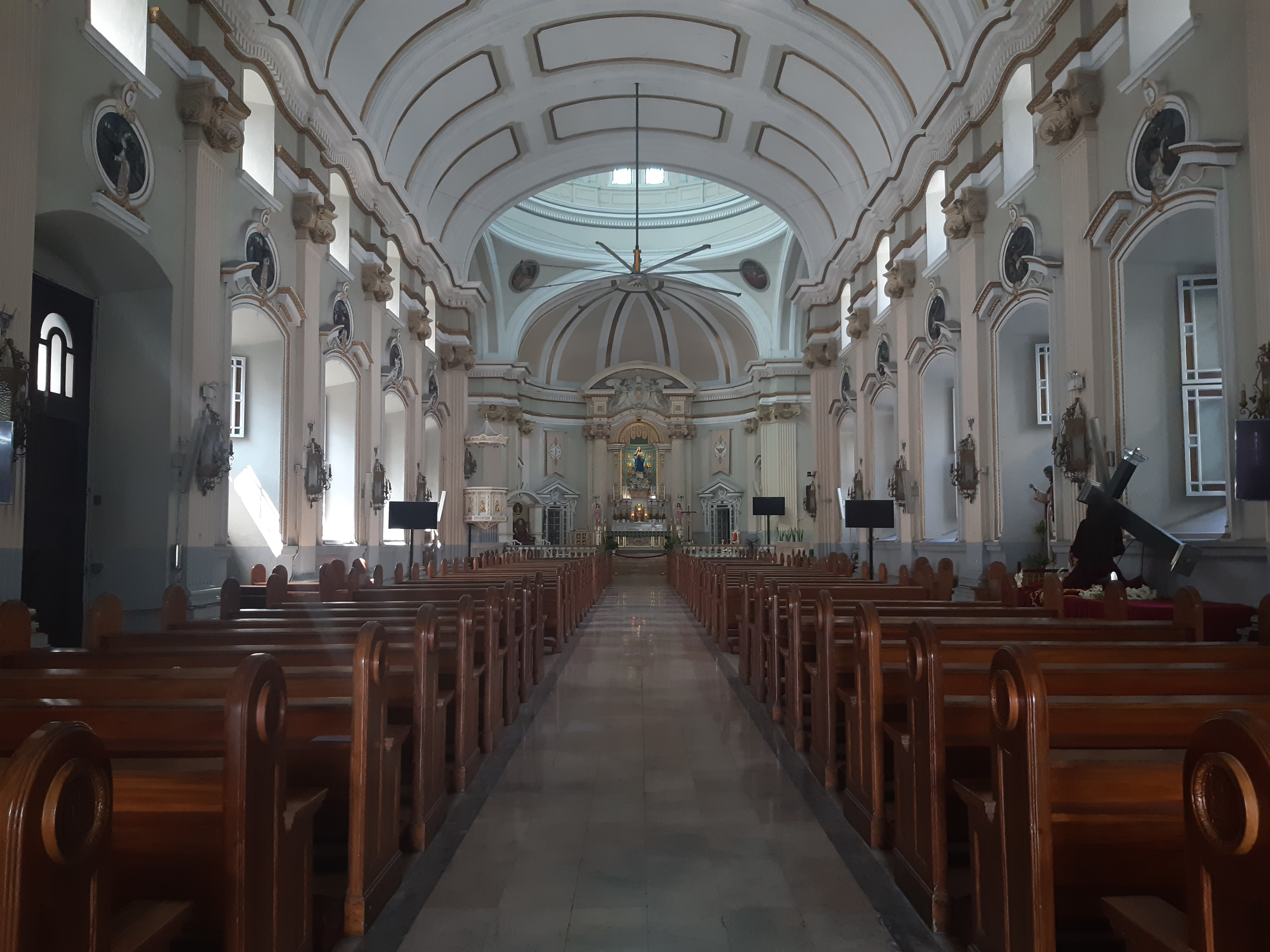
Cathedral nave in 2024

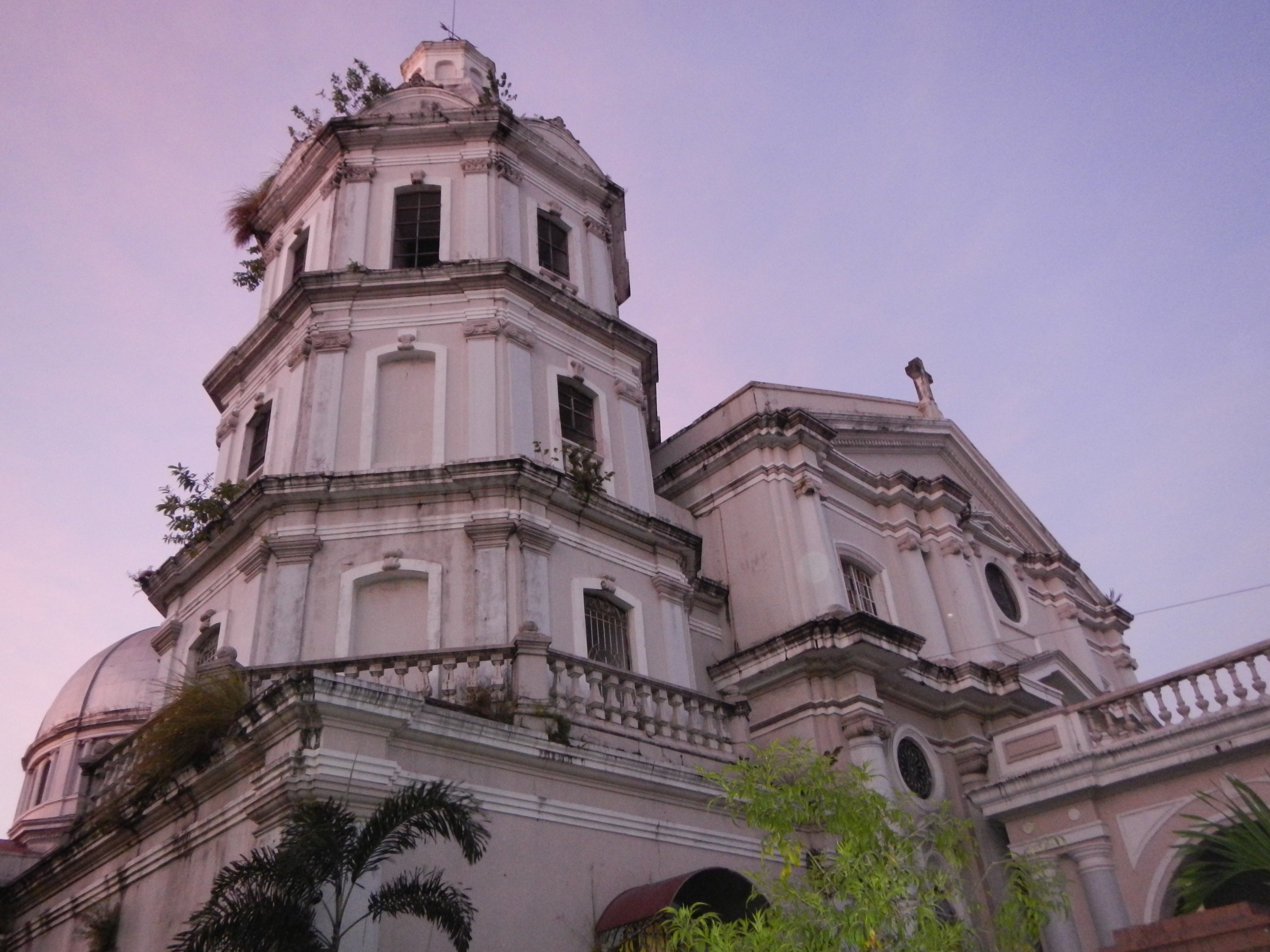
Belfry (Bell tower)

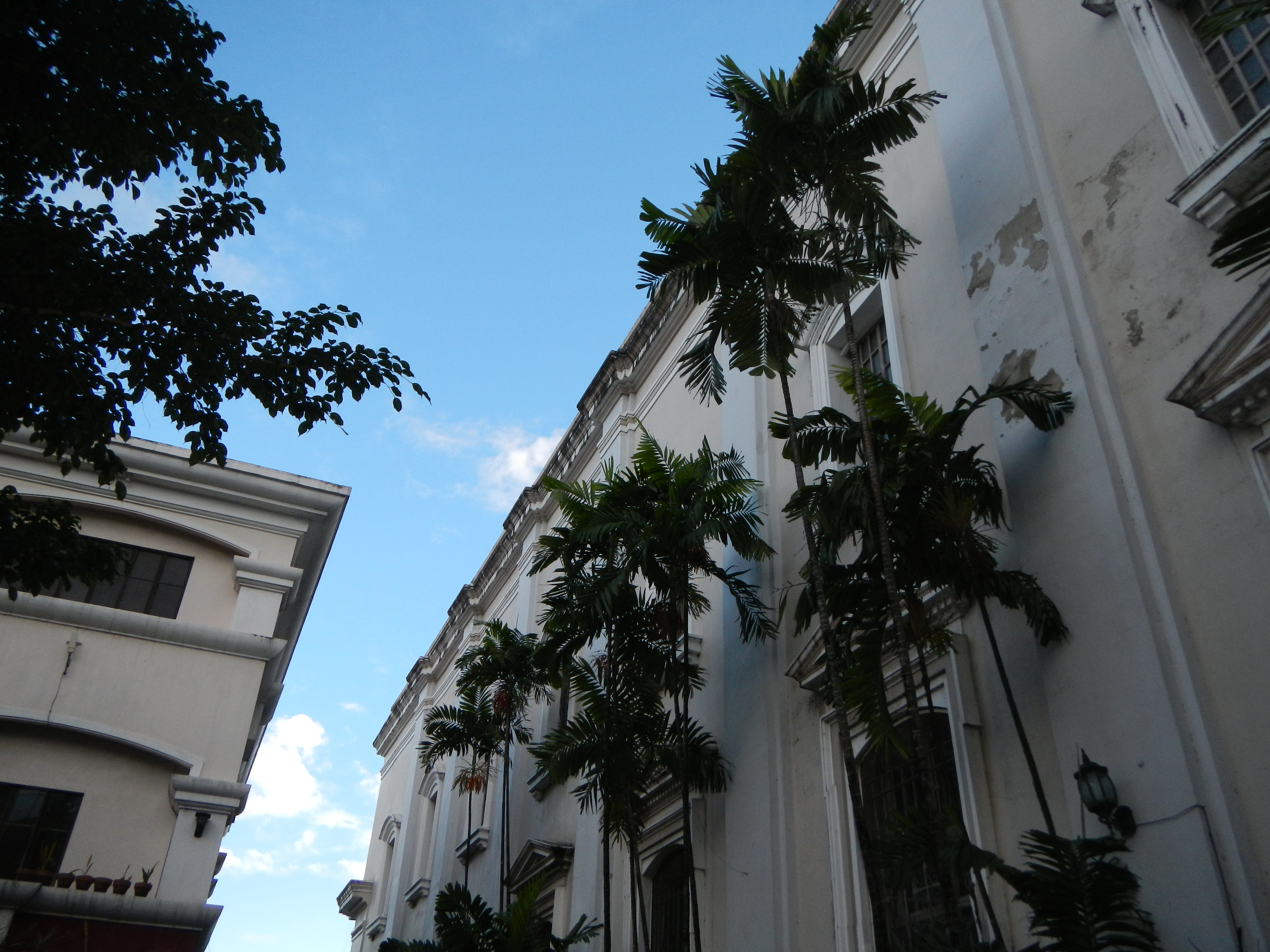
Right side of the Cathedral

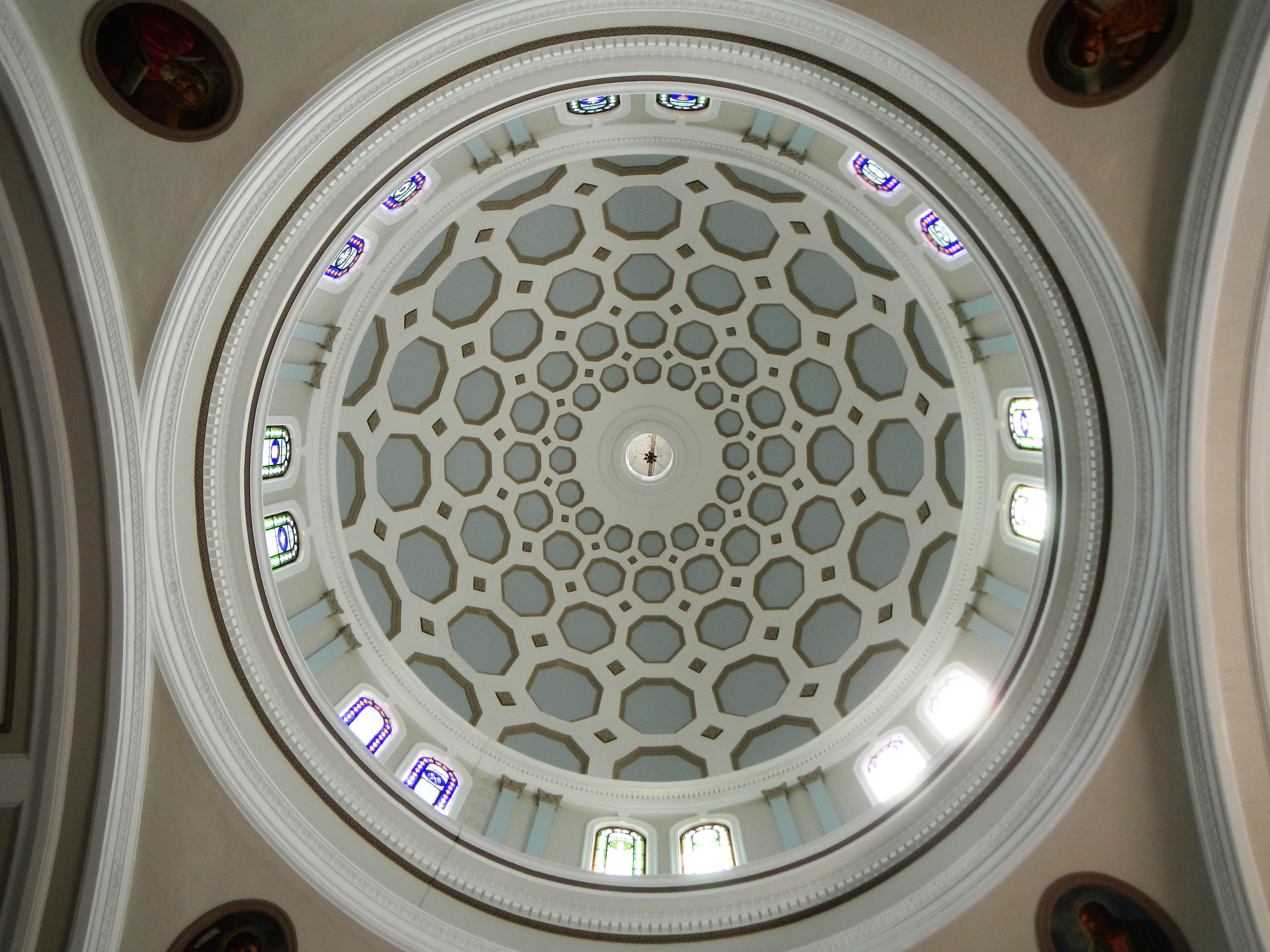
Dome interior

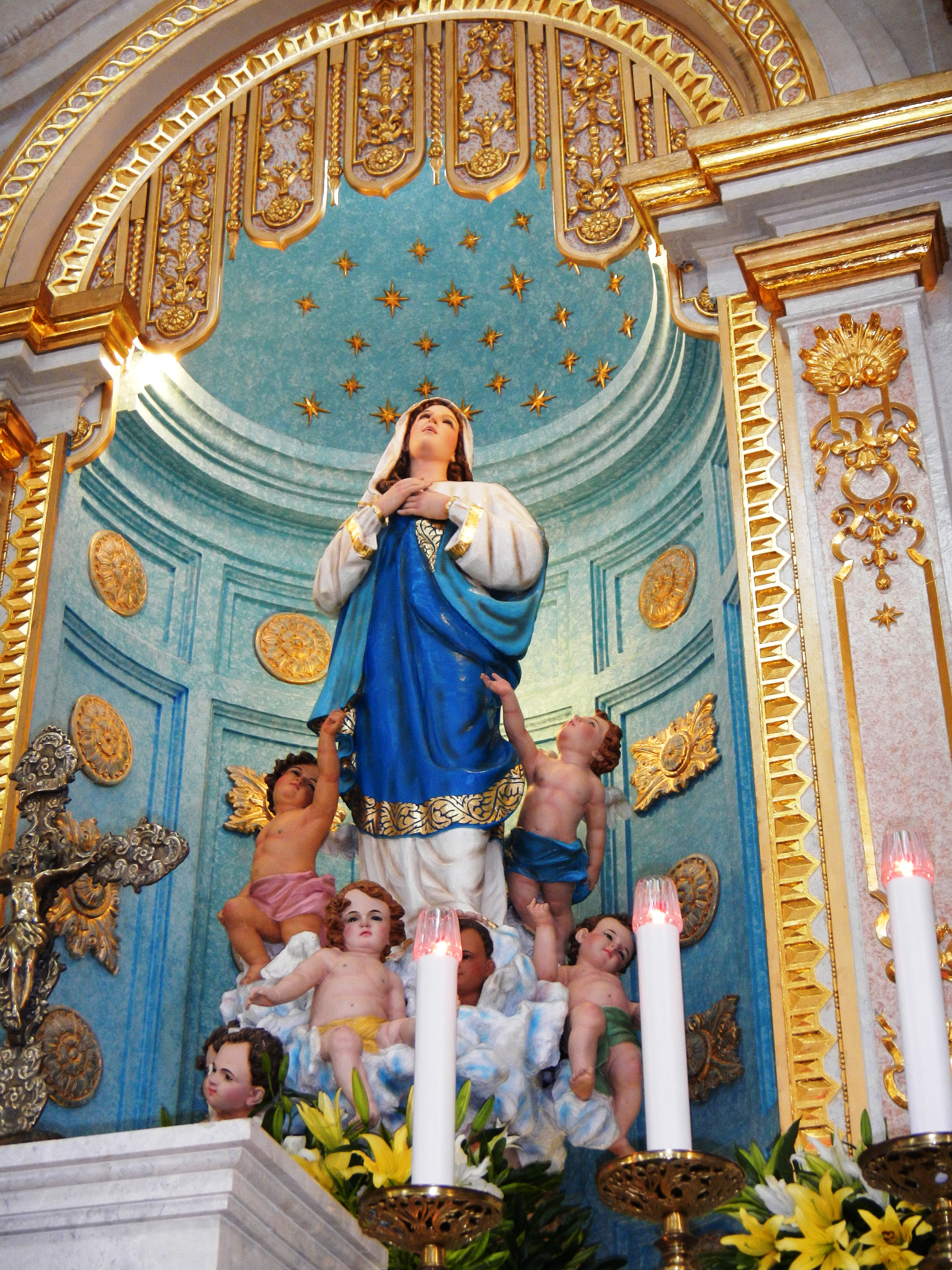
The image of the Assumption in the main altar

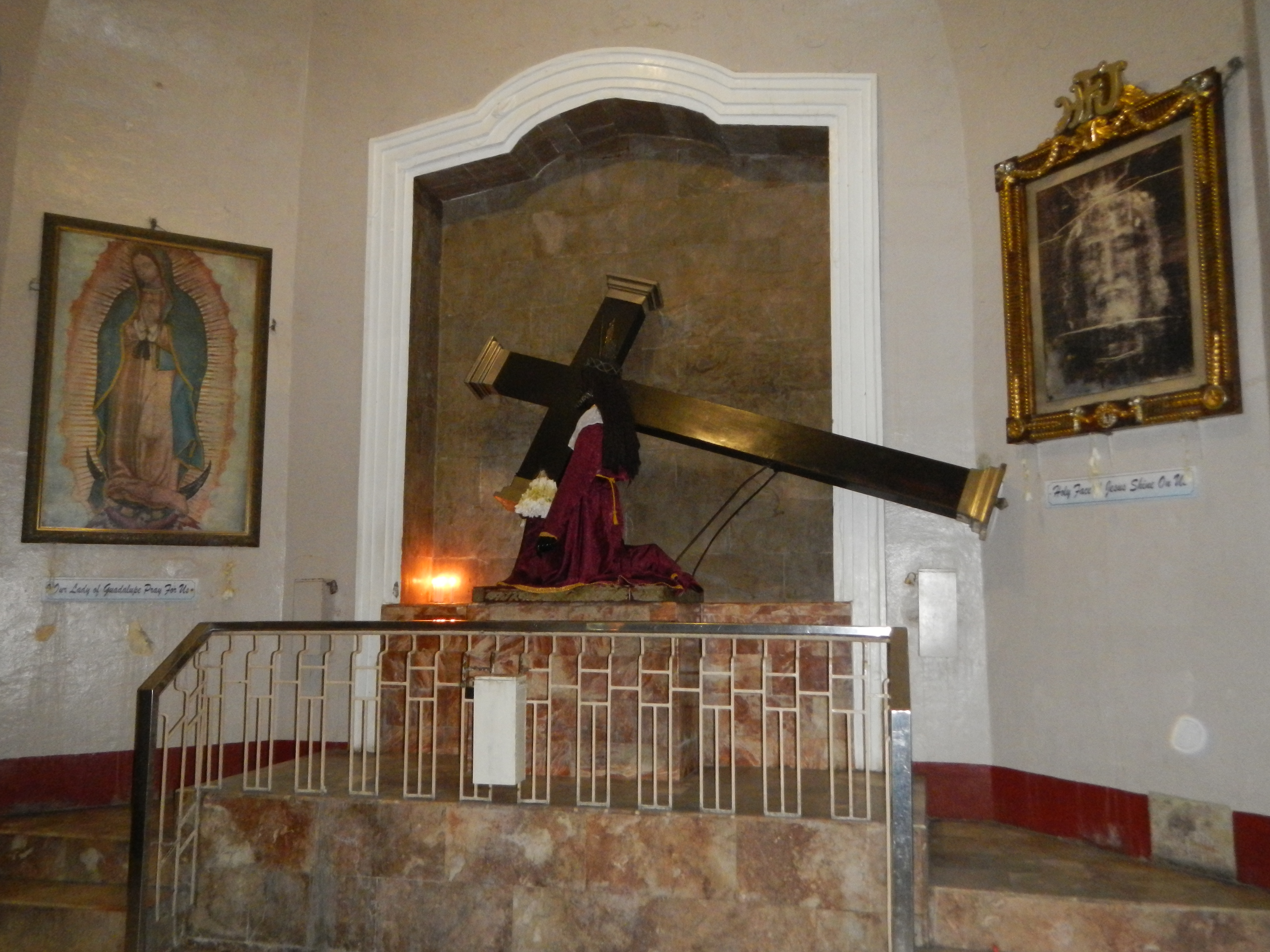
Altar of the Black Nazarene of Quiapo
