= Juan Cordella =

Roman Catholic prelate (died 1552)

Most Reverend Juan Cordella
- Bishop of Guardialfiera
- Church: Catholic Church
- Diocese: Diocese of Guardialfiera
- In office: 1548–1552
- Predecessor: Giovanni Battisti de Lisulis
- Successor: Antonio Benedetti

Personal details
- Died: 1552 Guardialfiera, Italy

Juan Cordella (died 1552) was a Roman Catholic prelate who served as Bishop of Guardialfiera (1548–1552).

== Biography ==
On 22 March 1548, Juan Cordella was appointed by Pope Paul III as Bishop of Guardialfiera. He served as Bishop of Guardialfiera until his death in 1552.

== See also ==
- Catholic Church in Italy

== External links and additional sources ==
- Cheney, David M. "Diocese of Guardialfiera (Guardia)". Catholic-Hierarchy.org. (for Chronology of Bishops) ^{[self-published]}
- Chow, Gabriel. "Titular Episcopal See of Guardialfiera (Italy)". GCatholic.org. (for Chronology of Bishops) ^{[self-published]}

Catholic Church titles
Preceded by Giovanni Battisti de Lisulis	Bishop of Guardialfiera; 1548–1552	Succeeded by Antonio Benedetti
