= Antonio Benedetti (bishop of Guardialfiera) =

Most Reverend Antonio Benedetti
- Bishop of Guardialfiera
- Church: Catholic Church
- Diocese: Diocese of Guardialfiera
- In office: 1552–1556
- Predecessor: Juan Cordella
- Successor: Giacomo Lomellino del Canto

Personal details
- Died: 1556 Guardialfiera, Italy

Antonio Benedetti (died 1556) was a Roman Catholic prelate who served as Bishop of Guardialfiera (1552–1556).

== Biography ==
On 12 September 1552, Antonio Benedetti was appointed by Pope Julius III as Bishop of Guardialfiera. He served as Bishop of Guardialfiera until his death in 1556.

== External links and additional sources ==
- Cheney, David M. "Diocese of Guardialfiera (Guardia)". Catholic-Hierarchy.org. (for Chronology of Bishops) ^{[self-published]}
- Chow, Gabriel. "Titular Episcopal See of Guardialfiera (Italy)". GCatholic.org. (for Chronology of Bishops) ^{[self-published]}

Catholic Church titles
Preceded by Juan Cordella	Bishop of Guardialfiera; 1552–1556	Succeeded by Giacomo Lomellino del Canto
