= Miss Grand Campania =

Italian regional beauty pageant

- Formation: 29 August 2019; 7 years ago
- Founder: Luca De Simone
- Type: Beauty pageant
- Headquarters: Campania
- Location: Italy
- Members: Miss Grand Italy
- Official language: Italian
- Directors: Luca De Simone (2019); Crescenzo De Carmine (2019–2020); Emanuele Porcelli (2021); Franco Capasso (2022–present)

Miss Grand Campania is an Italian regional female beauty pageant, founded in 2019 by Luca De Simone and Crescenzo De Carmine who organized two separated regional events in Mirabella Eclano and Montesarchio, respectively. The winners of the contest represent the region of Campania in the Miss Grand Italy national pageant.

Since the foundation of the Miss Grand Italy pageant, Campania candidates obtained the main title once in 2020, won by Filomena Venuso. The other placements they obtained remain unclarified due to a lack of national competition results publicized by both regional and national organizers.

== History ==
After the Miss Grand Italy director, Giuseppe Puzio, began franchising the regional competitions to local organizers in 2019, the license for Campania was granted to Crescenzo De Carmine. In cooperation with the director of Miss Grand Basilicata, Dario Marena, the first contest of 'Miss Grand Campania' was then held parallelly with Miss Grand Basilicata on 31 August of that year at the Centro Commerciale Liz Gallery in Montesarchio,

The contest featured 20 contestants, of whom, a model Erika Argenziano was named Miss Grand Campania 2019, while Mirea Sorrentino was elected Miss Grand Basilicata. Other two regional final of Miss Grand Campania 2019 happened in Mirabella Eclano and San Bartolomeo in Galdo; the winner of which also qualified for the national stage. The competition license was then transferred to Emanuele Porcelli in 2021.

Later in 2022, the license was then taken over by Franco Capasso. Under his direction, several local pageants, such as in Naples and San Martino Valle Caudina, was organized to determined the candidates for the region-level contest. Capasso also served as the pageant director in 2023 and 2024.

Besides the main winner, some regional runners-up were also sent to compete in the national round.

== Editions ==
The following table details Miss Grand Campania's annual editions since 2019.

Edition	Date	Final venue	Entrants	Winner	Ref.
1st	29 August 2019	Piazza XXIV Maggio, Mirabella Eclano (AV)	21	Federica Rizza	
1st	18 August 2019	Via Pasquale Circelli, San Bartolomeo in Galdo (BN)	No data available		
2nd (Note: Held parallelly with the Miss Grand Basilicata 2019 pageant.)	31 August 2019	Centro Commerciale Liz Gallery, Montesarchio (BN)	20	Erika Argenziano	
3rd (Note: Held parallelly with the Miss Grand Basilicata 2020 pageant.)	6 September 2020	Relais Il Feudo Hotel, Ceppaloni (BN)	N/A	Erika De Marino	
4th	August 2021	No data available (Note: Two local pageants were organized to select the finalists for the Miss Grand Campania 2021 pageant; however, no information regarding the region-level contest.)			
5th	9 September 2022	Antiche Terme Jacobelli, Telese Terme (BN)	14	Lucia Pia Vitolo	
6th (Note: Held parallelly with the Miss Grand Molise 2023 and Miss Grand Basilicata 2023 pageants.)	3 June 2023	Via Madre Teresa di Calcutta, San Martino Valle Caudina (AV)	N/A	Rossella Crisci	
7th	22 August 2024	Piazza Medaglie d'Oro, Montefalcone di Val Fortore (BN)	N/A	Krystyn Soares	

== National competition ==
The following is a list of representatives of the region of Campania in the Miss Grand Italy national pageant.

Year	Representative	Original regional title	Placement at Miss Grand Italy	Ref.
2019	Federica Rizza	Miss Grand Campania 2019 (Mirabella Eclano-based pageant)	No data available	
2019	Erika Argenziano	Miss Grand Campania 2019 (Montesarchio-based pageant)	No data available	
2020	Erika De Marino	Miss Grand Campania 2020	No data available	
2020	Filomena Venuso	No data available	Winner	
2021	No data available			
2022	Lucia Pia Vitolo	Miss Grand Campania 2022	No data available	
2023	Rossella Crisci	Miss Grand Campania 2023	No data available	
2024	Krystyn Soares	Miss Grand Campania 2024	3rd runner-up	
