= John of Tufara =

Italian hermit

Saint John of Tufara
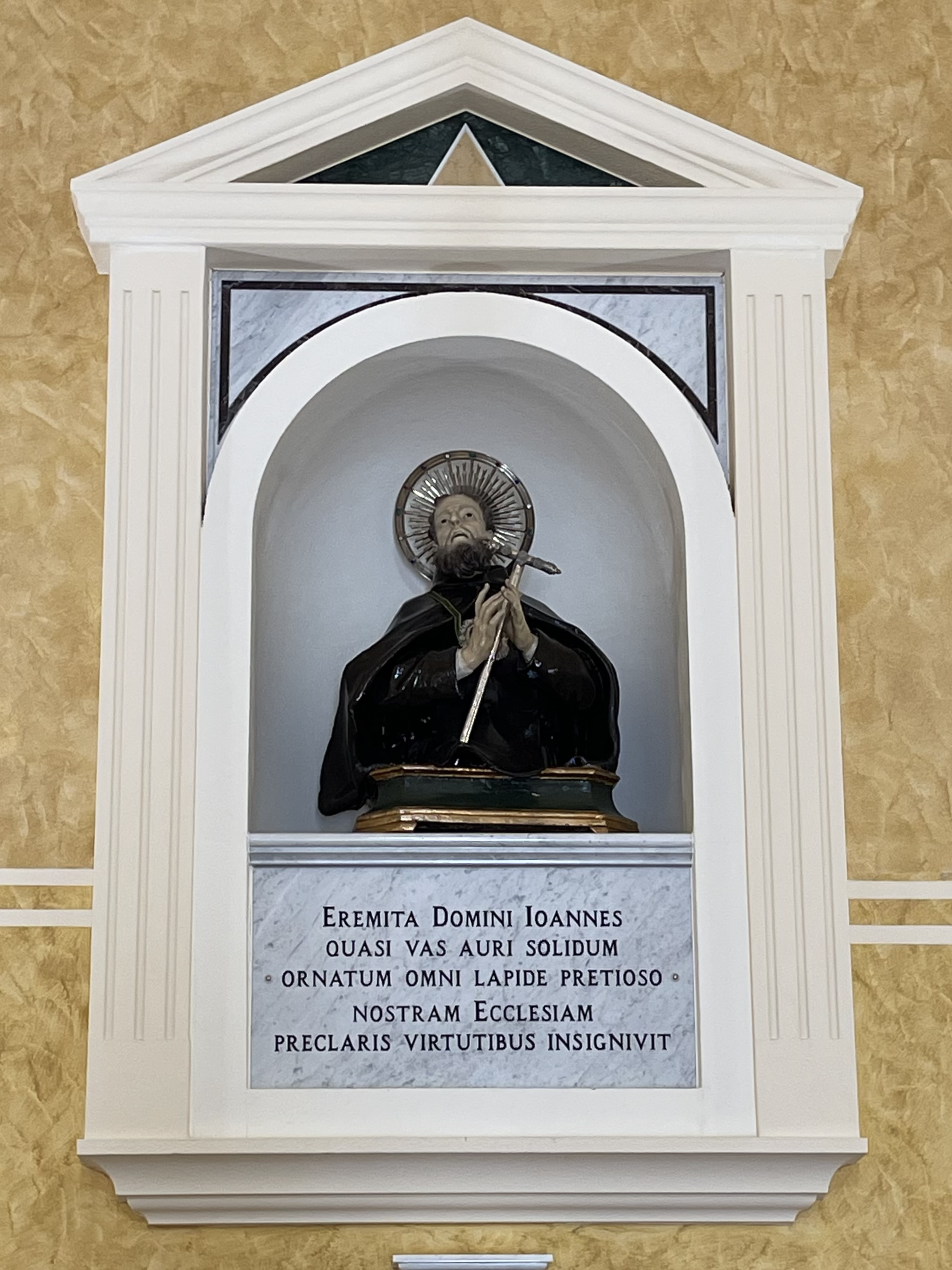
- Statue of John of Tufara in the church of San Giovanni Eremita a Gualdo Mazzocca

Eremite
- Born: 1084; Tufara, Duchy of Apulia and Calabria (located in modern Italy)
- Died: 14 November 1170; Foiano di Val Fortore, Kingdom of Sicily
- Venerated in: Catholic Church
- Canonized: 28 August 1221 (pre-Congregation)
- Feast: 14 November
- Patronage: Foiano di Val Fortore; Tufara

John of Tufara (Italian: Giovanni da Tufara; Latin: Ioannes de Tuphária) also known as John the Hermit (Italian: Giovanni Eremita; Latin: Ioannes eremítæ; 1084 – 14 November 1170) was an Italian hermit, monastery founder, and saint in the Catholic Church. He is the patron saint of his birth town Tufara and of Foiano di Val Fortore where he died.

== Biography ==
John was born in 1084 in Tufara. He had a strained relationship with his parents Mainardo and Maria who disapproved of John's strong religious feelings. As such, aged 18 John decided to leave his family for Paris. However, he did not feel comfortable in the busy city and instead preferred the quiet of the countryside. John returned to Tufara where he learned that his parents had died. He stayed briefly in the town with his brother Benedetto, before giving away all of his possessions to the poor and deciding to live as a hermit in the caves surrounding Baselice. John remained in these caves for the last 46 years of his life, during which time he amassed a small following of local men who admired his way of life.

=== Monastery ===
In 1156, obtained authorisation from Pope Adrian IV to build a monastery. In the same year, he began the construction of the monastery of Santa Maria di Gualdo Mazzocca (English: Saint Mary of Gualdo Mazzocca) in Foiano di Val Fortore. The name of the monastery refers to its dedication to Mary, mother of Jesus, as well as its location next to the Mazzocca woods and the feudal lord to whom the land had previously belonged. This later became an abbey which went on to offer prayer and assistance to the poor.

=== Death ===
Following a violent fever and physical exhaustion, on 14 November 1170—aged 86—John died in his monastery. The monks at the abbey buried his body in a hidden location in the forest for fear that it would be stolen.

== Legacy ==
=== Sainthood ===
Following John's death, the brothers of the abbey several times petitioned the pope to make him a saint. In a papal bull dated to 3 June 1218, Pope Honorius III directed the bishops of Dragonara and Lucera to investigate John's life and purported miracles. Following further requests from the monks, Archbishop Ruggiero of Benevento sent the Bishop of Vulturara—assisted but the Bishops of Dragonara and Montecorvino—to Foiano di Val Fortore in his place. They were tasked with retrieving John's remains from the Mazzocca forest (with the monks' help) and consecrating them. After his remains were exhumed, on 28 August 1221, the Bishops (led by the Bishop of Vulturara as the oldest) performed the ancient rite of elevatio et translatio corporis officiato. By this, John was officially canonised. Following the ceremony, a bone from John's right arm was given to the citizens of Tufara who used in a procession to the forest that night. Some other relics of the body were kept by the bishops and others given to nearby towns; the remainder of the body was kept in the monastery's altar. This was later taken to a church in San Bartolomeo in Galdo to offer protection against a plague outbreak, and remains there today.

There has been debate over whether John is officially a saint due to his unusual canonization process. The 2004 edition of the Roman Martyrology lists John as a Blessed, suggesting his status was not that of a saint. However, on 30 October 2013, the Congregation for the Causes of Saints clarified this issue with a communication which declared that he is officially a saint and ought to be venerated as such. This affirmed that the ancient rite of elevatio et translatio corporis officiato provided a valid form of canonisation for John.

=== Monastery ===
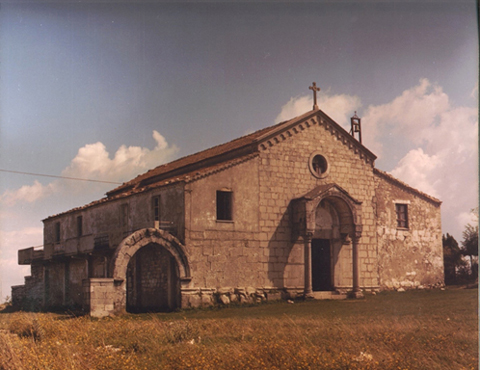
The church of San Giovanni Eremita a Mazzocca before the 1980 earthquake

The monastery founded by John was heavily damaged by the 1456 Central Italy earthquakes, rebuilt, and then destroyed entirely by a fire in 1630. However, a new church, the Chiesa di San Giovanni Eremita a Mazzocca (English: Church of St John the Hermit at Mazzocca), was erected in the same location in 1716 and dedicated to John. This church was consecrated by Archbishop Orsini of Benevento, who later became Pope. The church was heavily damaged in a 1980 earthquake, but was reconstructed in the 1990s and this still stands today.

=== Patronage ===
John is the patron saint of Tufara and Foiano di Val Fortore. His official feast day is 14 November, the date of his death, but celebrations also take place on the date of his canonisation. In San Bartolomeo in Galdo, John's remains form part of the annual procession for the town's own patron saint (Saint Bartholomew) on 24 August.
