= Tufara =

- Comune
- Comune di Tufara
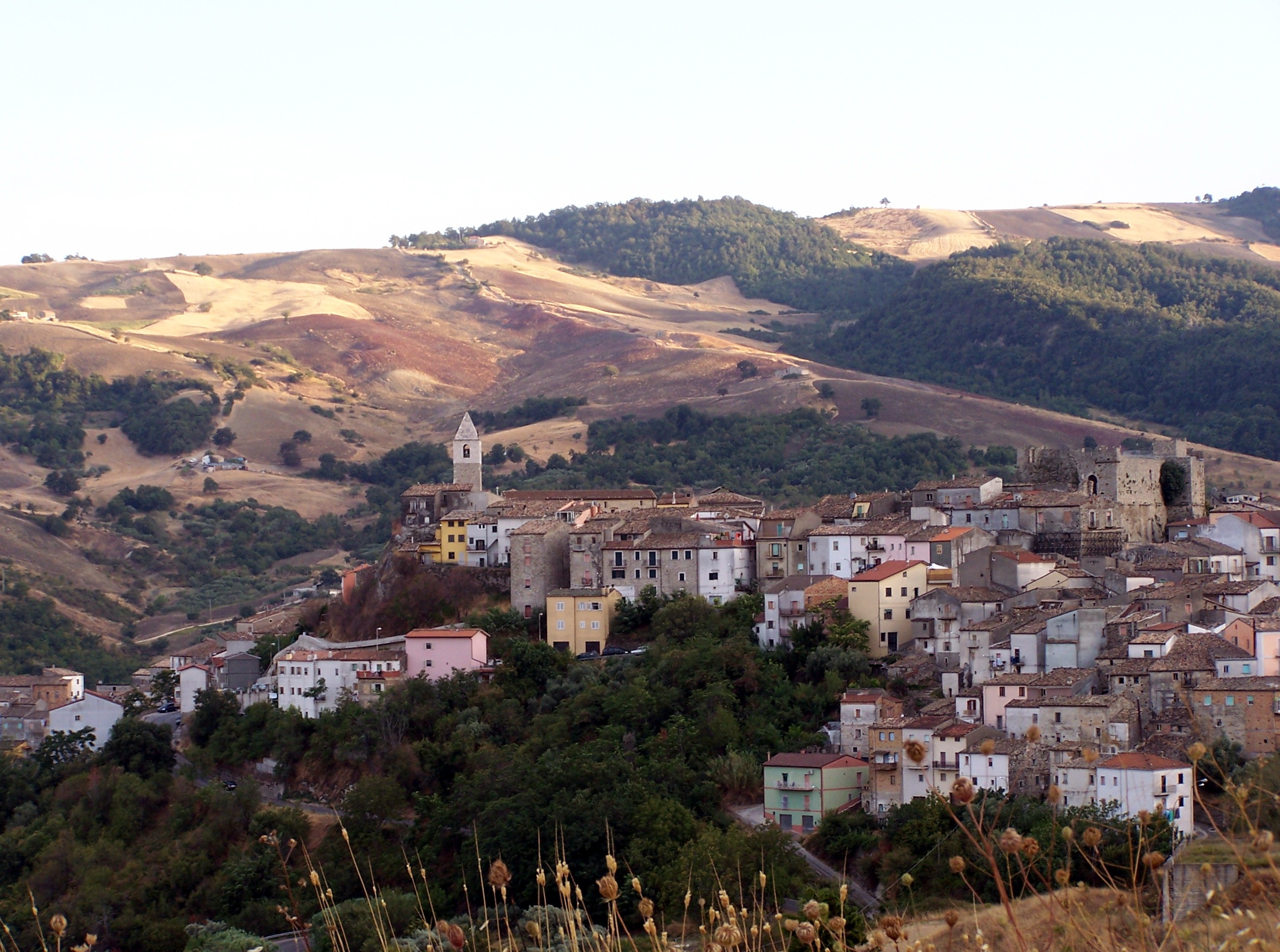
- Panorama of Tufara

- Location within Italy Location within Molise
- Coordinates: 41°29′N 14°57′E
- Country: Italy
- Region: Molise
- Province: Campobasso (CB)

Government
  - Mayor: Donato Pozzuto

Area
  - Total: 35.52 km^{2} (13.71 sq mi)
- Elevation: 420 m (1,380 ft)

Population (31 December 2017)
  - Total: 887
  - Density: 25.0/km^{2} (64.7/sq mi)
- Demonym: Tufaroli
- Time zone: UTC+1 (CET)
  - Summer (DST): UTC+2 (CEST)
- Postal code: 86010
- Dialing code: 0874
- Patron saint: John of Tufara
- Saint day: August 28
- Website: Official website

Tufara is a comune (municipality) in the Province of Campobasso in the Italian region Molise, located about 25 kilometres (16 mi) southeast of Campobasso.

Tufara borders the following municipalities: Castelvetere in Val Fortore, Celenza Valfortore, Gambatesa, Riccia, San Bartolomeo in Galdo, San Marco la Catola.
