= Ginestra degli Schiavoni =

- Comune
- Comune di Ginestra degli Schiavoni
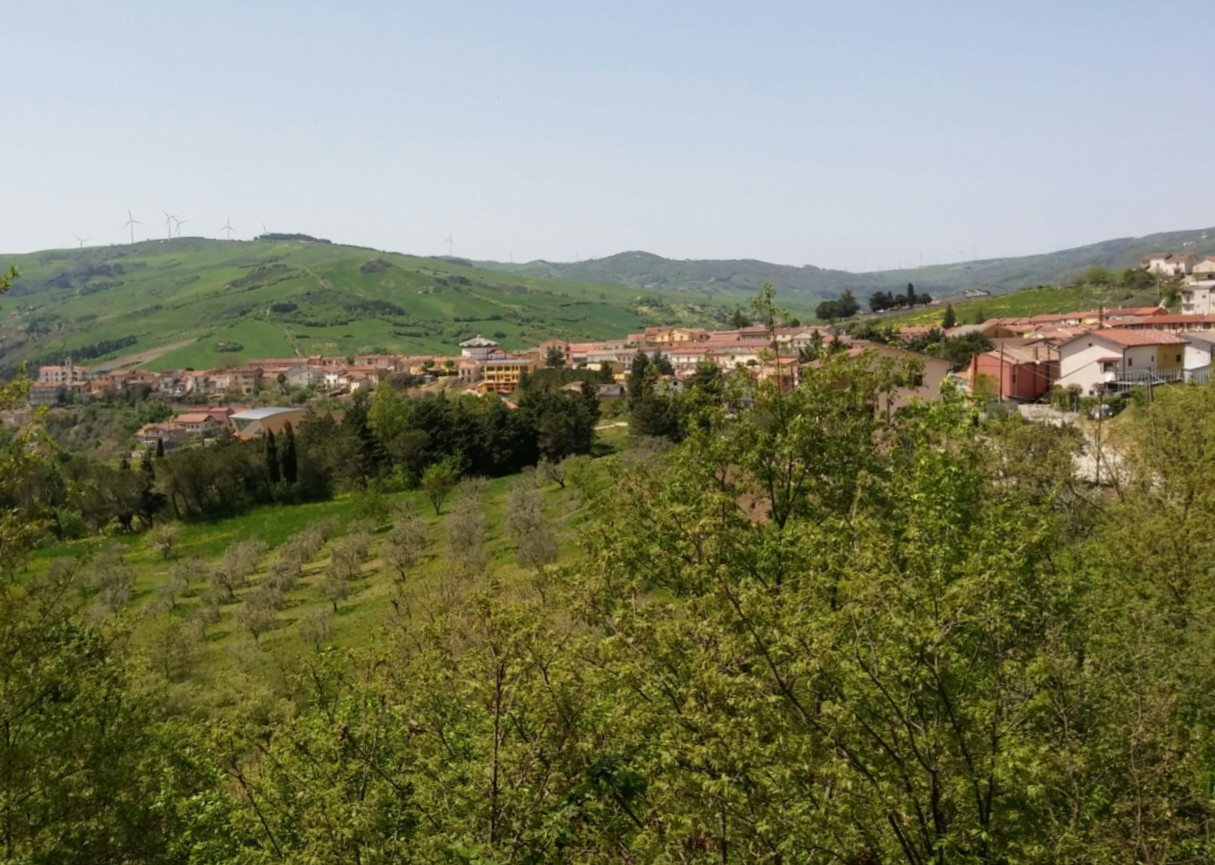

- Location within Italy Location within Campania
- Coordinates: 41°17′N 15°2′E
- Country: Italy
- Region: Campania
- Province: Benevento (BN)

Government
  - Mayor: Zaccaria Spina

Area
  - Total: 14.79 km^{2} (5.71 sq mi)
- Elevation: 540 m (1,770 ft)

Population (1 January 2020)
  - Total: 439
  - Density: 29.7/km^{2} (76.9/sq mi)
- Demonym: Ginestresi
- Time zone: UTC+1 (CET)
  - Summer (DST): UTC+2 (CEST)
- Postal code: 82020
- Dialing code: 0824
- ISTAT code: 062036
- Patron saint: Saint Anthony of Padua; Saint Blaise
- Saint day: 13 June; 3 February
- Website: Official website

Ginestra degli Schiavoni is a comune (municipality) in the Province of Benevento in the Italian region Campania, located about 80 km (50 mi) northeast of Naples and about 25 km (16 mi) northeast of Benevento.

Ginestra degli Schiavoni is part of the Roman Catholic Diocese of Ariano Irpino-Lacedonia; its territory borders the following municipalities: Casalbore, Castelfranco in Miscano, Montecalvo Irpino, Montefalcone di Val Fortore, San Giorgio La Molara.
