= Buonalbergo =

- Comune
- Comune di Buonalbergo
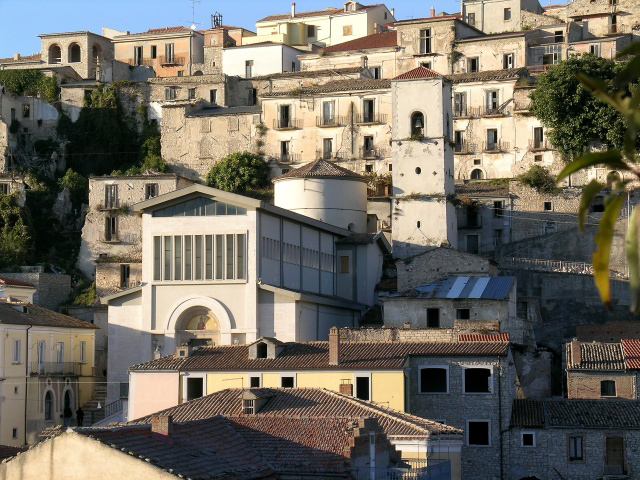

- Location within Italy Location within Campania
- Coordinates: 41°13′N 14°59′E
- Country: Italy
- Region: Campania
- Province: Benevento (BN)

Government
  - Mayor: Michelantonio Panarese

Area
  - Total: 25.08 km^{2} (9.68 sq mi)
- Elevation: 555 m (1,821 ft)

Population (1 January 2020)
  - Total: 1,630
  - Density: 65.0/km^{2} (168/sq mi)
- Demonym: Buonalberghesi
- Time zone: UTC+1 (CET)
  - Summer (DST): UTC+2 (CEST)
- Postal code: 82020
- Dialing code: 0824
- ISTAT code: 062011
- Patron saint: Saint Nicholas of Bari
- Saint day: 6 December
- Website: Official website

Buonalbergo is a comune (municipality) in the Province of Benevento in the Italian region Campania, located about 70 km (43 mi) northeast of Naples and about twenty kilometers northeast of Benevento.

Buonalbergo borders the following municipalities: Apice, Casalbore, Montecalvo Irpino, Paduli, San Giorgio La Molara, and Sant'Arcangelo Trimonte.
