= Baselice =

Municipality in Campania, Italy

- Comune
- Comune di Baselice
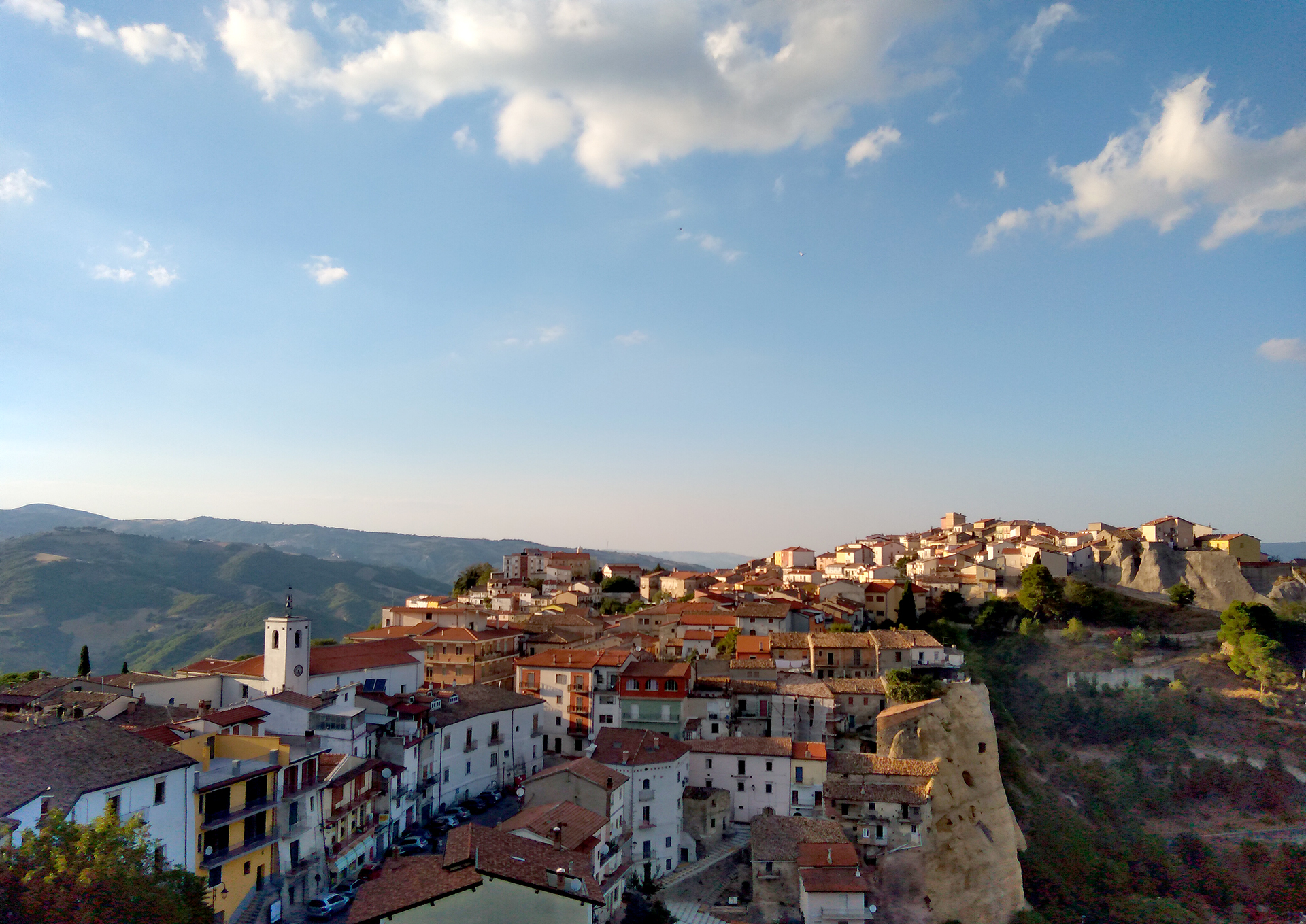
- Panorama of Baselice

- Location within Italy Location within Campania
- Coordinates: 41°24′N 14°58′E
- Country: Italy
- Region: Campania
- Province: Benevento (BN)

Government
  - Mayor: Lucio Ferella

Area
  - Total: 47.82 km^{2} (18.46 sq mi)
- Elevation: 620 m (2,030 ft)

Population (1 January 2020)
  - Total: 2,228
  - Density: 46.59/km^{2} (120.7/sq mi)
- Demonym: Baselicesi
- Time zone: UTC+1 (CET)
  - Summer (DST): UTC+2 (CEST)
- Postal code: 82020
- Dialing code: 0824
- ISTAT code: 062007
- Patron saint: Leonard of Noblac
- Saint day: November 6
- Website: Official website

Baselice is a comune (municipality) in the Province of Benevento in the Italian region Campania, located about 90 km (56 mi) northeast of Naples and about 35 km (22 mi) northeast of Benevento.

Baselice borders the following municipalities: Castelvetere in Val Fortore, Colle Sannita, Foiano di Val Fortore, San Bartolomeo in Galdo, San Marco dei Cavoti.
