= Miss Grand Basilicata =

Italian female beauty pageant

- Formation: 31 August 2019; 7 years ago
- Founder: Dario Marena
- Type: Beauty pageant
- Headquarters: Basilicata
- Location: Italy
- Members: Miss Grand Italy
- Official language: Italian
- Director: Dario Marena (2019); Canio Loguercio (2021); Franco Capasso (2023–present)

Miss Grand Basilicata is an Italian regional female beauty pageant, founded in 2019 by Dario Marena. The winners of the contest represent the region of Basilicata in the Miss Grand Italy national pageant.

Since their first participation in the Miss Grand Italy pageant, Basilicata representatives won the contest once in 2019 by Mirea Sorrentino, and was placed among the top 10 finalists in 2020 with the representation of Michela Cardillo Stagno.

== History ==
After the Miss Grand Italy director, Giuseppe Puzio, began franching the regional competitions to local organizers in 2019, the license for Basilicata was granted to Dario Marena. In cooperation with the director of Miss Grand Campania, Crescenzo De Carmine, the first contest of Miss Grand Basilicata was then held parallelly with Miss Grand Campania on 31 August of that year at the Centro Commerciale Liz Gallery in Montesarchio, The contest featured 20 contestants, of whom, a model Mirea Sorrentino was named the Miss Grand Basilicata 2019, while Erika Argenziano was elected as Miss Grand Campania.

Several local contests and auditions were organized annually to determine the finalists for the region-level pageants. In 2021 and 2023, the competition license was transferred to Canio Loguercio and Franco Capasso, respectively.

== Editions ==
The following table details Miss Grand Basilicata's annual editions since 2019.

Edition	Date	Final venue	Entrants	Winner	Ref.
1st (Note: Held parallelly with the Miss Grand Campania 2019 pageant.)	31 August 2019	Centro Commerciale Liz Gallery, Montesarchio (BN)	20	Mirea Sorrentino	
2nd (Note: Held parallelly with the Miss Grand Campania 2020 pageant.)	6 September 2020	Relais Il Feudo Hotel, Ceppaloni (BN)	N/A	Michela Cardillo Stagno	
3rd	9 September 2021	MH Matera Hotel, Matera (MT)	No data available		
4th (Note: Held parallelly with the Miss Grand Campania and Miss Grand Molise pageants.)	3 June 2023	Via Madre Teresa di Calcutta, San Martino Valle Caudina (AV)	N/A	Lucia Pia Vitolo	
5th	22 August 2024	No data available		Doriana Nigro	

== National competition ==
The following is a list of representatives of the region of Basilicata in the Miss Grand Italy national pageant.

Year	Representative	Original regional title	Placement at Miss Grand Italy	Ref.
2019	Mirea Sorrentino	Miss Grand Basilicata 2019	Winner	
2020	Michela Cardillo Stagno	Miss Grand Basilicata 2020	Top 10	
2023	Lucia Pia Vitolo	Miss Grand Basilicata 2023	No data available	
2024	Doriana Nigro	Miss Grand Basilicata 2024	Unplaced	
