= Santarcangelo =

Santarcangelo may refer to:

- Sant'Arcangelo, a town and comune in the province of Potenza (Basilicata), Italy
- Santarcangelo di Romagna, a town and comune in the province of Rimini (Emilia-Romagna), Italy
  - Santarcangelo Calcio, an Italian association football club, based in Santarcangelo di Romagna.
- Sant'Arcangelo Trimonte, a comune in the Province of Benevento (Campania), Italy
