= Malvizza mud volcanoes =

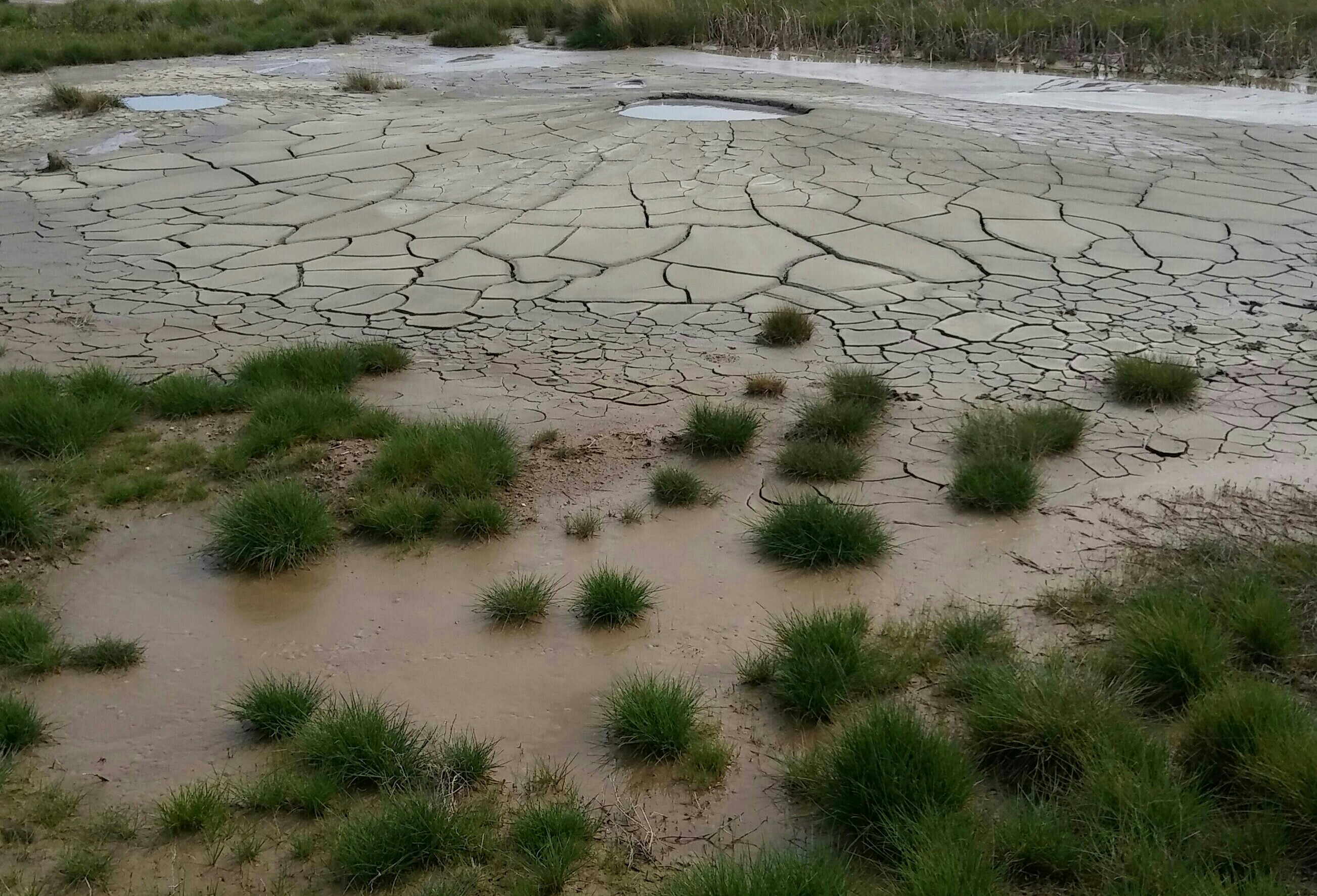
One of the many volcanoes emerging from the Malvizza plain

The Malvizza mud volcanoes are the largest array of mud volcanoes in the southern Apennines of Italy. The phenomenon is purely sedimentary in nature, in contrast to volcanic phenomena like mofettas, fumaroles, and solfataras. The Malvizza mud volcanoes show some affinities with the salse (saltwater springs) of the central-northern Apennines and with the maccalube (mud fountains) of Sicily.

== Location and description ==
The Malvizza mud volcanoes (from malvizza, the name of a bird in the Irpinia dialect) are located in the Campania Apennines, in the municipal territory of Montecalvo Irpino, along a plateau of the Miscano valley at an altitude of 518 m (1,699 ft) above sea level. They are characterized by the emission of gaseous hydrocarbons—primarily methane, which at most sites accounts for more than 90% of emissions—as well as a continuous flow of weakly alkaline water (pH = 8) at a temperature of 18 °C (64 °F). The solid component of the mud is composed of more than 95% illitic clay, with only traces of calcite and quartz. The deep layers of the subsoil of the Malvizza mud volcanoes are primarily scaly clays, alternating with regular layers of brecciole and nummulitic limestone.

The volcanoes are located along the provincial road that leads from the state road 90 bis to Castelfranco in Miscano. The existence of an additional single mud volcano is attested on the opposite side of the Miscano valley, about 5 km from the site of the Malvizza mud volcanoes. It is located along the Fràscino arm (a branch of the Pescasseroli-Candela sheep track), south of the Miscano river, and at an altitude of 400 m (1,300 ft) above sea level.

== Cause ==
The mud volcanoes are caused by the presence of deep deposits of gaseous hydrocarbons which, in response to the compressive tectonic stresses typical of the Apennines-Adriatic area, tend to rise towards the surface. This produces bubbling in the spring waters they infiltrate.

Due to extensive liquid emissions, the volcanoes' surface structures are short in height, even during droughts. They are sometimes nearly flat due to rainwater erosion, which enlarges the affected area and inhibits the development of vegetation.

The presence of methane and other flammable (and potentially explosive) gases in the subsoil is well-known in the Miscano valley. In 1867, a firedamp spill and its subsequent explosion (triggered by torches used for lighting) caused the death of an entire team of workers during the construction of the Cristina railway tunnel near the station at Castelfranco in Miscano, along the Naples-Foggia line. This incident occurred almost halfway between the Fràscino branch and the Malvizza mud volcanoes.

== Scientific interest ==
The Malvizza mud volcanoes (and more generally the Miscano valley) have been the subject of scientific studies to determine the possible exploitation of natural gas resources, the volcanoes' contribution to the global greenhouse effect (methane is a typical greenhouse gas), and the hypothesis that abnormal variations in emission radon levels may be precursors of seismic events. The site is also an ecological niche of a very peculiar microflora and microfauna. In 2005, a new species of gram-positive bacterium Alkalicoccus saliphilus was discovered, isolated among the green algae of the Malvizza Bubbles. This new species shows a 99.9% affinity with a strain of bacteria isolated in a soda lake in Inner Mongolia (China), and over 97% with two other strains isolated in a lake basin of the Rift Valley (Kenya).
