= Immacolata Concezione, Riccia =

Church in Riccia, Italy

Immacolata Concezione

Religion
- Affiliation: Roman Catholic
- Province: Archdiocese of Campobasso-Boiano
- Region: Molise
- Rite: Latin Rite

Location
- Location: Riccia, Molise
- Interactive map of Immacolata Concezione

Architecture
- Type: Church

Immacolata Concezione ("Immaculate Conception", Italian: Chiesa dell'Immacolata), also called the Convent of the Cappuccini, is a Roman Catholic church located on Piazza Umberto I in the town of Riccia, Province of Campobasso in the region of Molise, Italy.

== History ==
In 1679, the church and convent of the Capuchins was erected upon the ruins of the former Convent of the Celestine Order.

The austere stone facade, rusticated inferiorly, has bronze doors; the lunettes above have a relief depicting the Immaculate Conception and Jesus by the sculptor Ettore Marinelli. On the roof of the main entrance is a much restored fresco of St Francis of Assisi receiving the Stigmata (1696) by an unknown painter. The church also has a painting of the Immaculate Conception with the Holy Spirit and St Joseph and Saints (1685) by Benedetto Brunetti.

== See also ==
- Santissima Annunciata, Riccia
- Santa Maria Assunta, Riccia
- Sanctuary of the Madonna del Carmine, Riccia
- Santa Maria delle Grazie, Riccia
- Monument to the Fallen, Riccia
