= Foiano di Val Fortore =

- Comune
- Comune di Foiano di Val Fortore
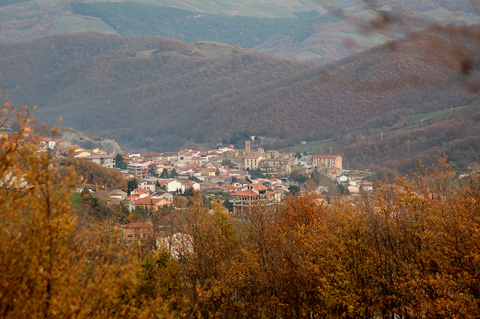

- Location within Italy Location within Campania
- Coordinates: 41°21′N 14°59′E
- Country: Italy
- Region: Campania
- Province: Benevento (BN)
- Frazioni: Frassineta, Ponte Carboniera, Serra Verdito

Government
  - Mayor: Giuseppe Antonio Ruggiero

Area
  - Total: 41.31 km^{2} (15.95 sq mi)
- Elevation: 520 m (1,710 ft)

Population (1 January 2020)
  - Total: 1,393
  - Density: 33.72/km^{2} (87.34/sq mi)
- Demonym: Foianesi
- Time zone: UTC+1 (CET)
  - Summer (DST): UTC+2 (CEST)
- Postal code: 82020
- Dialing code: 0824
- ISTAT code: 062031
- Patron saint: John of Tufara
- Saint day: 14 November
- Website: Official website

Foiano di Val Fortore (Campanian: Fuiànë) is a comune (municipality) in the Province of Benevento in the Italian region of Campania, located about 80 kilometres (50 mi) northeast of Naples and about 30 kilometres (19 mi) northeast of Benevento.

Foiano di Val Fortore borders the following municipalities: Baselice, Molinara, Montefalcone di Val Fortore, Roseto Valfortore, San Bartolomeo in Galdo, San Giorgio La Molara, San Marco dei Cavoti.
