= Monument to the Fallen, Riccia =

War memorial in Riccia, Molise, Italy

Coordinates: 41°29′09″N 14°50′11″E

The Monument to the Fallen (Italian: Monumento ai Caduti) is located in Piazza Giacomo Sedati in the town of Riccia in the region of Molise, Italy. The bronze sculpture, by Enzo Puchetti, was built after the First World War and inaugurated in August 1925. The work, by a sculptor who created works for the fascist government, has a subtle irredentist message and depicts a local farmer from Riccia supporting a wounded warrior, while another youth below, in anticipation of future battles, asks for the fallen's laurel wreath. The names of those fallen during the Second World War were added subsequently.

== See also ==
- Santissima Annunciata, Riccia
- Santa Maria Assunta, Riccia
- Immacolata Concezione, Riccia
- Sanctuary of the Madonna del Carmine, Riccia
- Santa Maria delle Grazie, Riccia
