= Castelfranco in Miscano =

- Comune
- Comune di Castelfranco in Miscano
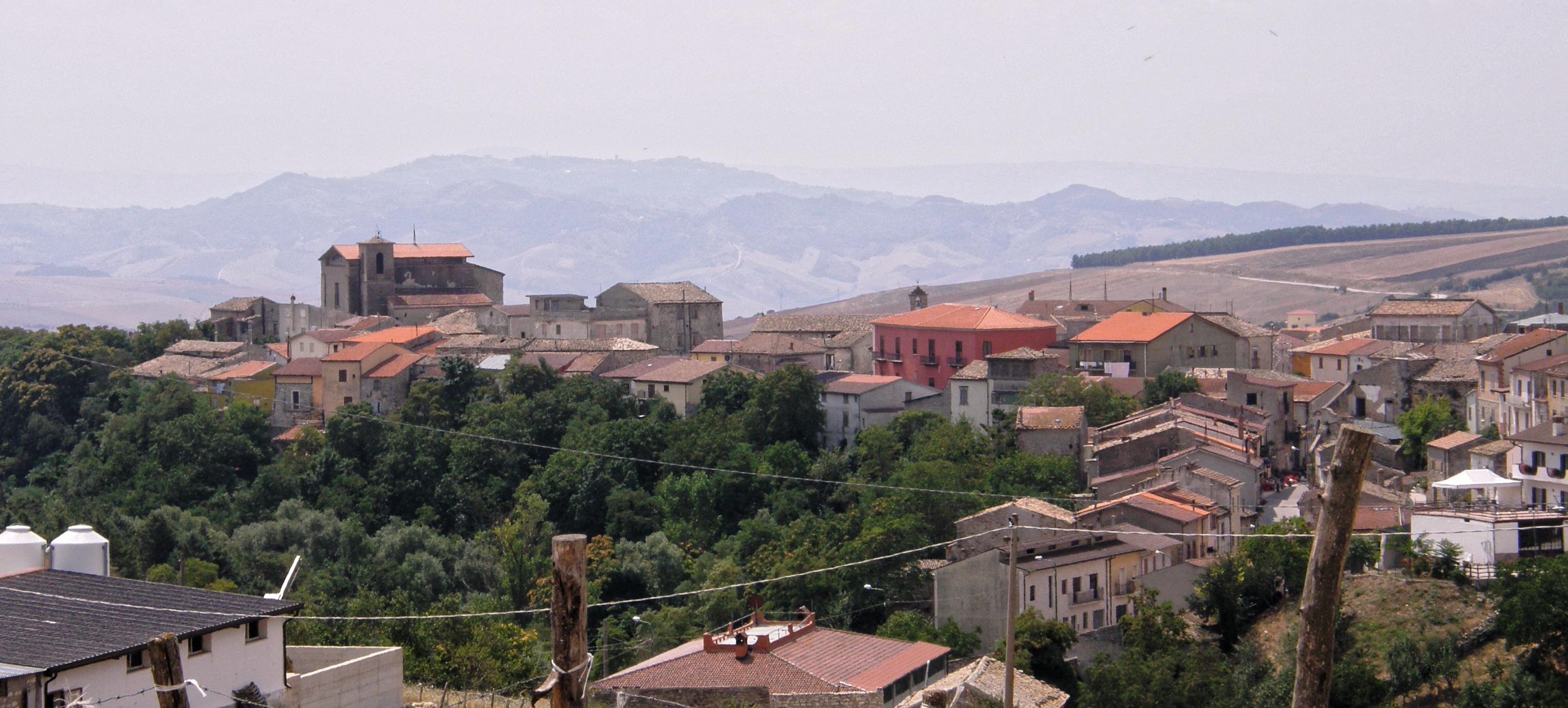

- Coat of arms

- Location within Italy Location within Campania
- Coordinates: 41°18′N 15°5′E
- Country: Italy
- Region: Campania
- Province: Benevento (BN)

Government
  - Mayor: Antonio Pio Morcone

Area
  - Total: 43.1 km^{2} (16.6 sq mi)
- Elevation: 760 m (2,490 ft)

Population (1 January 2020)
  - Total: 862
  - Density: 20.0/km^{2} (51.8/sq mi)
- Demonym: Castelfranchesi
- Time zone: UTC+1 (CET)
  - Summer (DST): UTC+2 (CEST)
- Postal code: 82022
- Dialing code: 0824
- ISTAT code: 062015
- Patron saint: John the Baptist
- Saint day: 24 June
- Website: Official website

Castelfranco in Miscano is a comune (municipality) in the Province of Benevento in the Italian region Campania, located about 90 km (56 mi) northeast of Naples and about 30 km (19 mi) northeast of Benevento.

It is a mountain agricultural village lying astride the Apennines and known for its caciocavallo, an Italian typical cheese. The largest mud pots in the Southern Apennines, namely Bolle della Malvizza (Blackbird Bubbles in Irpinian dialect), can be seen along the road that leads to the village.

Castelfranco in Miscano is part of the Roman Catholic Diocese of Ariano Irpino-Lacedonia and its territory borders the following municipalities: Ariano Irpino, Faeto, Ginestra degli Schiavoni, Greci, Montecalvo Irpino, Montefalcone di Val Fortore, Roseto Valfortore.
