= Sanctuary of the Madonna del Carmine, Riccia =

Church in Riccia, Italy

Coordinates: 41.4859°N 14.8286°E

Madonna del Carmine
- Location within Molise Location within Italy

Religion
- Affiliation: Roman Catholic
- Province: Archdiocese of Campobasso-Boiano
- Region: Molise
- Rite: Latin Rite

Location
- Location: Riccia, Molise
- Interactive map of Madonna del Carmine

Architecture
- Type: Church

The Sanctuary of the Madonna del Carmine, also called for short Santuario del Carmine is a 19th-century Roman Catholic church located in the town of Riccia, Province of Campobasso in the region of Molise, Italy.

== History ==
The Carmelite order had established themselves in Riccia by 1238, and remained till this small convent was suppressed by Pope Innocent X in 1653. Medieval frescoes decorated the church that had existed at the site prior the present structure, however, it was rebuilt and refurbished over the centuries, eliminating the early decoration. By the early 1500s, it had become a site for devotion to the Vergine del Carmelo (Our Lady of Mount Carmel). In 1863–1864, the ancient church was razed and rebuilt in an octagonal layout.

An inscription on the portal recalls that the church was rebuilt in gratitude to the ebbing of the 1854 cholera epidemic. The interior has a triptych depicting a Madonna and the prophets Elias and Eliseo. Below are saints John the Baptist, Michael, and Albert.

The church contains the statue of the Crowned Madonna of the Carmine and Child with Multiple Cherubs in Clouds, which is paraded through town during festivities was replaced by a work of L. Caputo, after the original burned during a fire before 1903. Every mid-July, this statue of the Madonna is paraded through the street and brought back to the church.

The church had two altars lateral to the main altar, one dedicated to Santa Filomena, the other to St Gregory.

== See also ==
- Santissima Annunciata, Riccia
- Santa Maria Assunta, Riccia
- Immacolata Concezione, Riccia
- Santa Maria delle Grazie, Riccia
- Monument to the Fallen, Riccia
