= Santissima Annunciata, Riccia =

Church in Riccia (CB), Italy

Coordinates: 41.4871°N 14.8362°E

Santissima Annunciata

Religion
- Affiliation: Roman Catholic
- Province: Archdiocese of Campobasso-Boiano
- Region: Molise
- Rite: Latin Rite

Location
- Location: Riccia, Molise
- Interactive map of Santissima Annunciata

Architecture
- Type: Church

The Church of the Santissima Annunciata or Annunziata is a 14th-century Roman Catholic religious structure located on Via Zaburri in the town of Riccia, Province of Campobasso in the region of Molise, Italy.

== History ==
The church was built in 1378 with a Gothic style portal with ogival arch. The columns retain capitals with animal and floral decorations as is typical of Romanesque architecture. The portal has a symbol of the Paschal lamb. Documents cite foundation of the Church by a confraternity which appears to have assembled from foreigners, mainly from Slavic regions from across the Adriatic, who had moved into the region.

On the left of the church rises a belltower with a clock. The tower was rebuilt in 1890 to replace the previous one dating from 1787, which had been damaged by an earthquake in 1805.

The interior has a number of paintings, including a main altarpiece depicting an Annunciation by an unknown artist; a Deposition by Adamo Rossi. The baptismal font in the sacristy dates from 1507. The main altar was reconsecrated in July 1715 by Cardinal Orsini.

On the walls of the choir are four oval medallions depicting the Sacramento. St. Augustine, both Assunte; They are embroidered in silk and somewhat spoiled.

The church once had an organ, adorned with artistic details in wood and gold tooling, built in 1578 by the architect Master Saverio Fiore, but when a roof fall took place in 1843, the organ was irreplaceably destroyed.

== See also ==
- Santa Maria Assunta, Riccia
- Immacolata Concezione, Riccia
- Sanctuary of the Madonna del Carmine, Riccia
- Santa Maria delle Grazie, Riccia
- Monument to the Fallen, Riccia
