= Riccia, Molise =

Riccia
- Comune
- Comune di Riccia
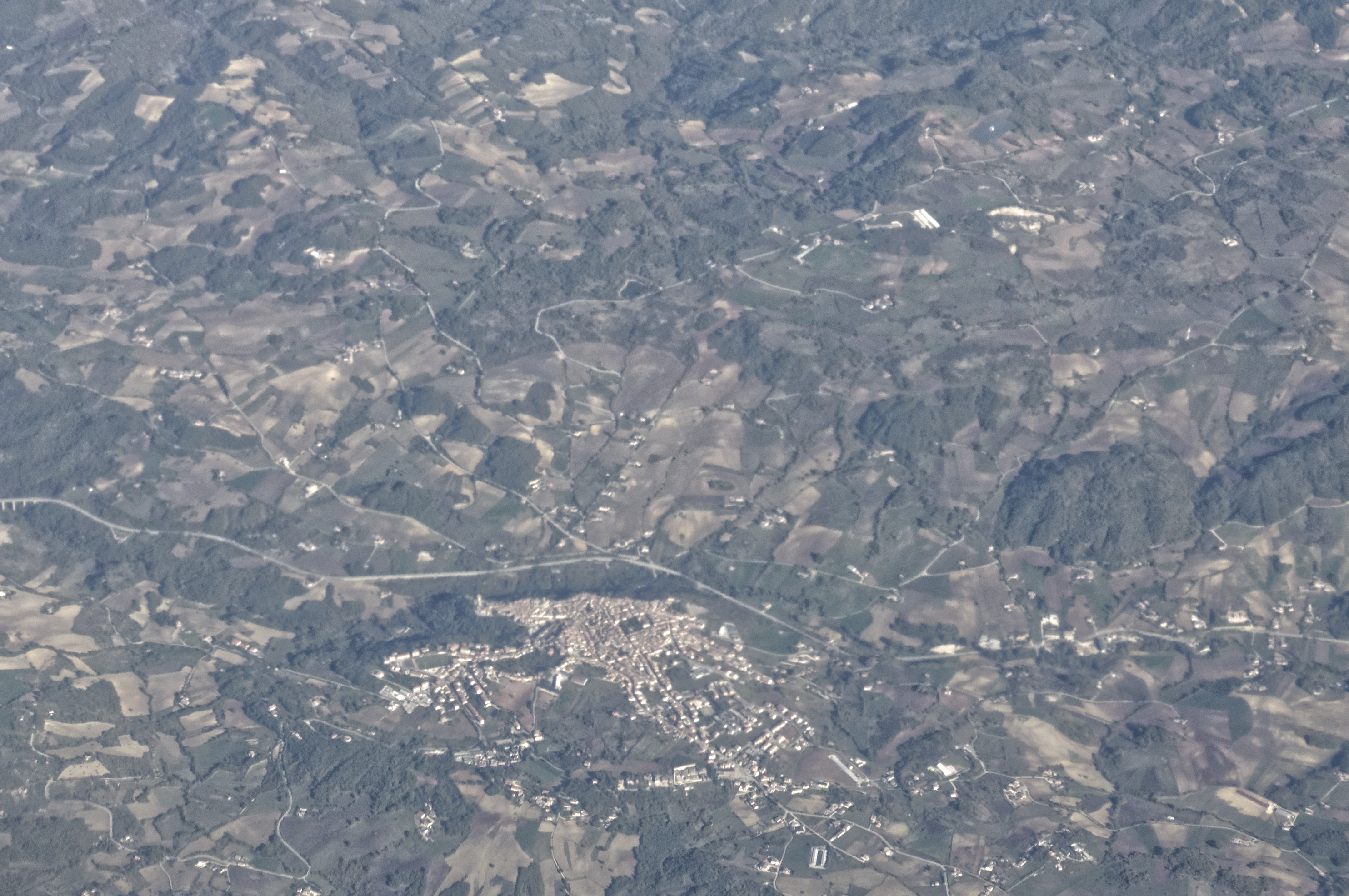
- View of Riccia, Molise

- Coat of arms

- Location within Italy Location within Molise
- Coordinates: 41°29′N 14°50′E
- Country: Italy
- Region: Molise
- Province: Campobasso (CB)
- Frazioni: Paolina, Sticozze, Mancini

Government
  - Mayor: Micaela Fanelli

Area
  - Total: 69.9 km^{2} (27.0 sq mi)
- Elevation: 680 m (2,230 ft)

Population (30 November 2017)
  - Total: 5,152
  - Density: 73.7/km^{2} (191/sq mi)
- Demonym: Riccesi
- Time zone: UTC+1 (CET)
  - Summer (DST): UTC+2 (CEST)
- Postal code: 86016
- Dialing code: 0874
- Patron saint: Madonna del Carmelo, St. Augustine
- Saint day: August 28
- Website: Official website

Riccia is a comune (municipality) in the Province of Campobasso in the Italian region of Molise, located about 15 kilometres (9 mi) southeast of Campobasso, with a population of about 5,600.

Riccia borders the following municipalities: Castelpagano, Castelvetere in Val Fortore, Cercemaggiore, Colle Sannita, Gambatesa, Jelsi, Pietracatella, Tufara.

== History ==
The first people who lived there came with Oscans. By the time of the arrival of the Samnites (4th century BC) the area was well developed and prosperous, as noted by objects found in the excavations of the area.

During the Social War (90–88 BC) the area was destroyed and the Romans colonized the Sannio area. The colonists included Roman troops from Ariccia, near Rome. They named the place "Ariccia" which then was changed to "Saricia", then to "Ricia" and finally, "Riccia".

In the second half of the 6th century, Riccia came under the rule of the Lombard Duke of Benevento.

In the 13th century, Riccia became part of the Monastery St. Pietro e Severo (St. Peter and St. Xavier), located in the nearby town of Torremaggiore. This ecclesiastical feudalism lasted throughout the Hohenstaufen period.

In 1238, Frederick II linked the properties of the castle of Riccia with that at the town of St. Severo, and exchanged it for the monastery at Torremaggiore. This exchange was confirmed in 1266 by King Charles of Anjou, who conceded Riccia to the famous jurist Bartolomeo De Capua, whose family ruled Riccia until 1792.

In May 1397, Count Andrea De Capua brought Costanza Chiaramonte, the former queen of Naples, to Riccia. Three years earlier, after the fortunes of her family had precipitously fallen, her marriage to King Ladislaus of Naples was annulled at Gaeta. She remained in Riccia until her death in 1422; she is buried in the Church of Santa Maria delle Grazie (also called Church of St. Stefano Corumano).

In 1500, Bartolomeo II De Capua built an elegant castle in Riccia and also restored the church of Santa Maria delle Grazie in Tuscan style, where five feudal lords and their ladies are buried.

In the beginning of this feudal period, the rulers of Riccia, the noble De Capua family, were viewed as fair and generous with the peasants. But over the years the peasants endured many hardships. Finally they rebelled, releasing enough hate and fury to burn down the castle in 1799. Today only a few ruins of the castle with its medieval watchtower may still be seen in the historical quarter of Riccia. The noble family De Capua became extinct with Bartolomeo VI in 1792. During World War II, 84 townspeople of Riccia were among the dead and wounded, but it was not bombed. After the war, because of the scarcity of work locally, Riccia had a strong outflow of immigration to northern Europe (France, Switzerland, Belgium Germany) and to Latin America (Venezuela and Argentina). However, in recent years, efforts by the town have increased the prosperity.

By decree of the President of the Republic, dated 15 October 1986, Riccia earned the title of "City".

== See also ==
- Church of the Santissima Annunciata
- Sanctuary of the Madonna del Carmine
- Santa Maria Assunta, 13th-century church
- Monument to the Fallen, Riccia
