= Santa Maria delle Grazie, Riccia =

Church in Riccia, Italy

Santa Maria delle Grazie

Religion
- Affiliation: Roman Catholic
- Province: Archdiocese of Campobasso-Boiano
- Region: Molise
- Rite: Latin Rite

Location
- Location: Riccia, Molise
- Interactive map of Santa Maria delle Grazie

Architecture
- Type: Church

Santa Maria delle Grazie, also known as the Church of the Beato Stefano Corumano, is a Renaissance style, Roman Catholic church near Largo Nicola Gioia, near the Piano della Cavallerizza in the town of Riccia, Province of Campobasso in the region of Molise, Italy.

== History ==
A church at this site was founded in antiquity, by the 4th or 5th century. It was rebuilt across the centuries, replacing the primitive construction. The main reconstruction was in 1500 under the patronage of Bartolomeo III, as announced in the facade frieze.

The simple and severe facade is made of white stone with a single small oculus above the central portal, almost devoid of decoration except for the shield of the Capua family atop in the center and a frieze dedication atop the portal to the Madonna delle Grazie. Atop the frieze is not a blank niche where the frescoed image of the virgin was once place. At the flanks of the facade are Doric pilasters; at top, a triangular tympanum.

Inside, the arches on the lateral walls hold the tombs of four members of the Capua family, two named Luigi, and a Francesco and Andrea. Some of the lunettes of the arches are painted with frescoes of religious subjects or heraldic symbols.

The church pavement is made of stone, as is the main altar, which hosts a painting of the Blessed Virgin and Child with the Holy Spirit, between St John the Baptist and St Stephen Protomartyr and a statue depicting the blessed Stefano Corumano. Corumano was an 11th-century monk and hermit from Riccia.

In the center of the floor, near the predella of the main altar, is the tomb of Bartolomeo III decorated with the shield with a garland of flowers.

== See also ==
- Santissima Annunciata, Riccia
- Santa Maria Assunta, Riccia
- Immacolata Concezione, Riccia
- Sanctuary of the Madonna del Carmine, Riccia
- Monument to the Fallen, Riccia
