= Pompilio Maria Pirrotti =

Italian Roman Catholic saint

Saint Pompilio Maria Pirrotti S.P.
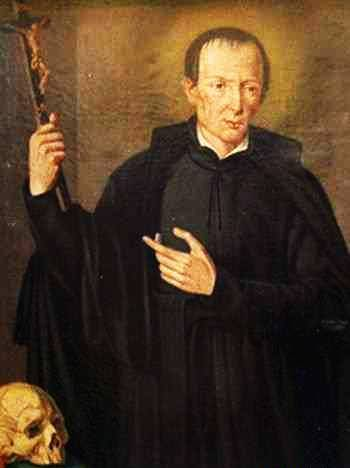

Priest
- Born: 29 September 1710; Montecalvo, Kingdom of Naples
- Died: 15 July 1766 (aged 55); Campi Salentina, Kingdom of Naples
- Venerated in: Roman Catholic Church
- Beatified: 26 January 1890, Saint Peter's Basilica, Kingdom of Italy by Pope Leo XIII
- Canonized: 19 March 1934, Saint Peter's Basilica, Vatican City by Pope Pius XI
- Feast: 15 July
- Attributes: Priest's cassock; Crucifix
- Patronage: Montecalvo Irpino; Campi Salentina

Pompilio Maria Pirrotti (29 September 1710 – 15 July 1766), born Domenico Michele Giovan Battista, was an Italian Roman Catholic priest and a professed member of the Piarists. He operated across the Kingdom of Naples as a teacher and as a preacher and he received widespread criticism from detractors that led to his immediate expulsion from the kingdom at the behest of the King. He was later readmitted into the kingdom after public pressure.

Pirrotti assumed the name of Pompilio Maria of Saint Nicholas upon becoming a professed member of the order and assumed his deceased brother's name (Pompilio Maria) when he commenced his novitiate.

In 1890, Pope Leo XIII beatified him and Pope Pius XI proclaimed him to be a saint of the Roman Catholic Church on 19 March 1934. For his tireless work with the children of central Italy he is known as the “Apostle of the Abruzzi”.

== Life ==
Domenico Michele Giovan Battista Pirrotti was born in Montecalvo, Italy on 29 September 1710, the sixth of eleven children to the nobleman Girolamo Pirrotti and his wife Orsola Bozzuti - Girolamo was a Doctor of Law. Domenico was baptized the next day.

Despite the opposition of his parents, when he was sixteen he consulted with his confessor on his religious vocation and fled his parents' home. He traveled to Benevento in order to pursue a path in a religious order. His father wrote to him a moving letter explaining his position on the matter and asking for his son's forgiveness; Girolamo also gave Pirrotti his blessing for his son's future.

At the age of eighteen, he entered the Piarist order and assumed the name of "Pompilio Maria" in honor of his deceased brother of that name. The name 'Pompilio' derives from the Medieval Latin 'Pompilius,' meaning 'fifth born'. During his religious formation, Pompilio toured various Italian regions close to his hometown. He assumed the habit in the novitiate of Santa Maria di Caravaggio in Naples on 2 February 1727, and at the end of the first year of his novitiate, obtained a special dispensation allowing him not to proceed to the second; he made his solemn profession on 25 March 1728 in Brindisi and it was then that he changed his name to that of "Pompilio Maria of Saint Nicholas".

Pirrotti was sent to Chieti in order to continue his philosophical studies, but fell ill around this period. He believed that a change of climate would be to his benefit so was moved to Melfi in Potenza where he continued his studies. He later travelled for further studies to Turi in Bari in 1733 after recovering from his illness. It was there in Bari that he served as a teacher of literature. Pirrotti returned to Naples where he was assigned to a Piarist house in Lecce as its superior and the Master of Novices.

Pirrotti was ordained to the priesthood on 20 March 1734 by the Archbishop of Brindisi, Andrea Maddalena. He was stationed in Brindisi from 1736 to 1739 and was in Ortona from 1739 to 1742.

During the famine that occurred near his hometown in 1765, he was on hand to distribute bread to the poor and to those suffering the most from the famine. He became known as a saint in his hometown and in the surrounding areas and was known for his devotion to the Blessed Virgin Mary whom he dubbed "Mamma Bella". Pirrotti also had a strong devotion to the Sacred Heart of Jesus and spread the devotion of the Via Crucis. He also established the confraternity "Charity of God" as a means of spreading the Christian virtues and also to support the dying.

From 1747 he began to suffer persecution from detractors who claimed he was too easy and indulgent with sinners who crowded his confessional. This led to him being suspended from taking confessions on the orders of the Cardinal Archbishop of Naples Antonio Sersale. King Charles III later signed a decree that led to Pirrotti's expulsion from the Kingdom of Naples; he rescinded the order upon increasing public pressure.

On 15 April 1765, Pirrotti began the long journey to Ancona and arrived in Lecce on 12 July 1766. After celebrating Mass on 13 July, he went to hear confessions, but was suddenly taken ill and immediately confined to his bed. He died and was buried where he was, in Apulia; but in 1966 his remains were transferred to the Sanctuary created for him, Santuario San Pompilio Maria Pirrotti.

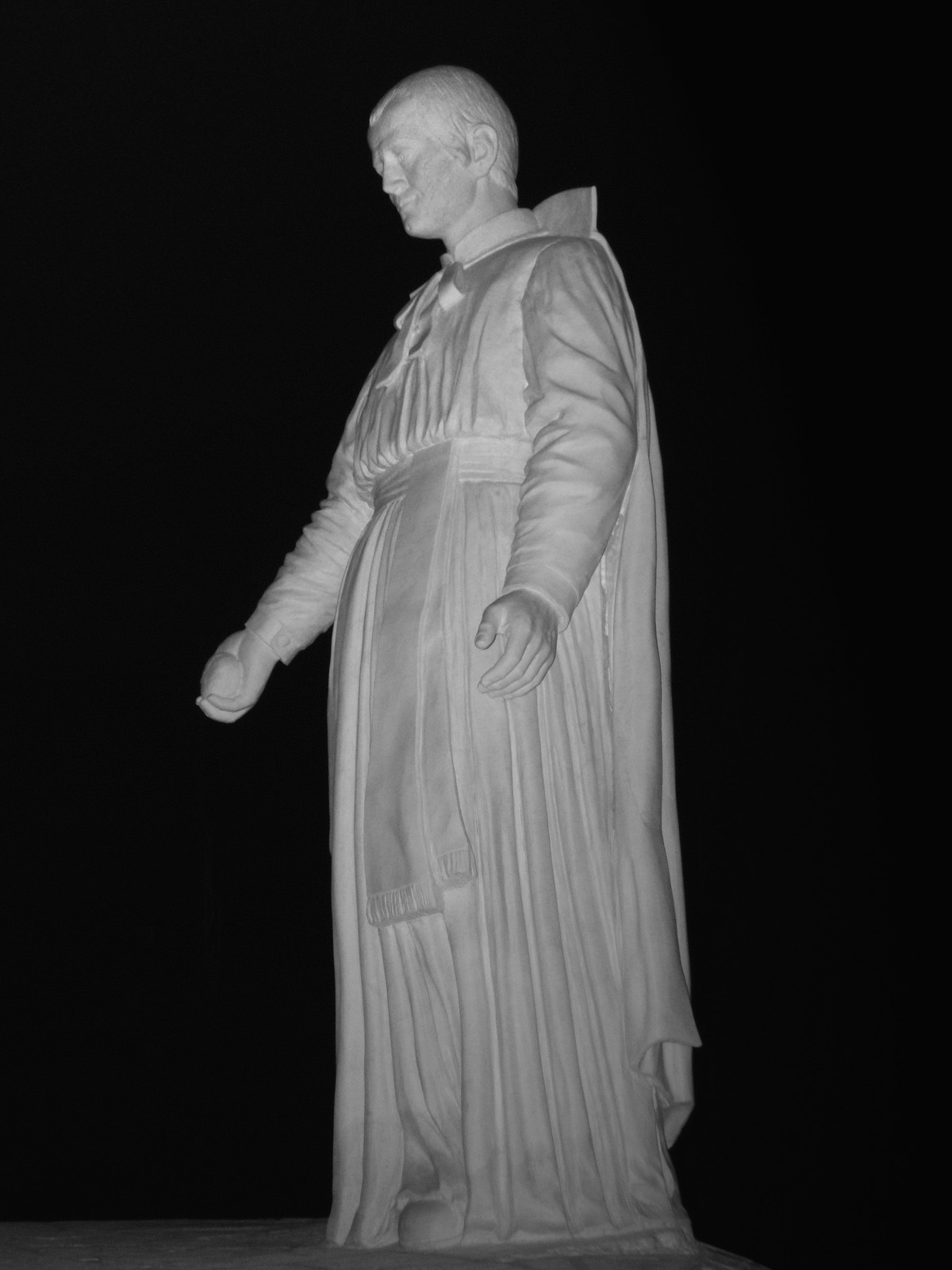
Statue of San Pompilio, Campi Salentina

== Legacy ==
There is a Catholic church in Montecalvo Irpino, Italy, which is located in the Archdiocese of Benevento and is dedicated to St. Pompilio Maria Pirrotti. On 2 July 2006, a park in Campi Salentina was named in his honor. A "Pompiliano Year" was initiated in 2010 to commemorate the third centenary of his birth.

== Sainthood ==
The proceedings for sainthood commenced in a diocesan process in Leece in 1835 and formal assent to the cause was granted not long after in which Pirrotti was accorded with the title Servant of God. Another process opened sometime after with the same intent of collecting documentation and material for compiling a large dossier on his life and works which was later transferred to the Congregation of Rites.

On 17 November 1878 he was proclaimed to be Venerable after Pope Leo XIII recognized that the late priest had lived a model life of heroic virtue. The same pope celebrated his beatification on 26 January 1890 after he recognized two miracles attributed to Pirrotti. The pope later issued a decree allowing for the resumption of the cause on 4 December 1892.

Following the recognition of two other miracles Pope Pius XI canonized Pirrotti as a saint of the Roman Catholic Church on 19 March 1934.
