= Casalbore =

- Comune
- Comune di Casalbore
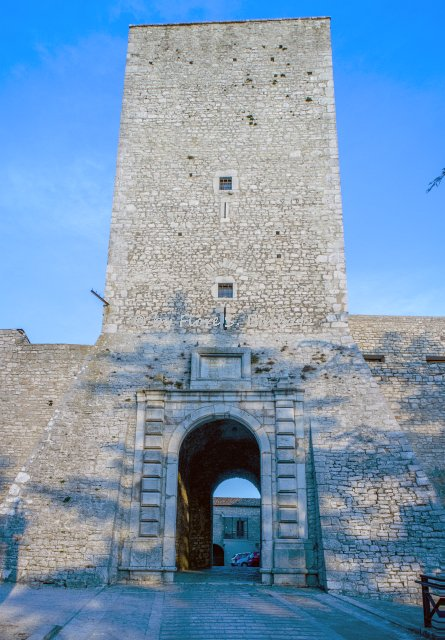
- Norman Tower.

- Location within Italy Location within Campania
- Coordinates: 41°14′6″N 15°0′27″E
- Country: Italy
- Region: Campania
- Province: Avellino (AV)
- Frazioni: Schiavonesca, Pagliarone, Mainardi, Frascino, Sant'Elia, Todino, Cupa, Cupazzo, San Ferro

Government
  - Mayor: Raffaele Fabiano

Area
  - Total: 28.09 km^{2} (10.85 sq mi)
- Elevation: 601 m (1,972 ft)

Population (31/08/2018)
  - Total: 1,754
  - Density: 62.44/km^{2} (161.7/sq mi)
- Demonym: Casalboresi
- Time zone: UTC+1 (CET)
  - Summer (DST): UTC+2 (CEST)
- Postal code: 83034
- Dialing code: 0825
- Patron saint: Madonna della Neve
- Saint day: 5 August
- Website: Official website

Casalbore is a town and comune in the province of Avellino, Campania, Italy.

Located in the Irpinia historical region, its territory borders the municipalities of Buonalbergo, Ginestra degli Schiavoni, Montecalvo Irpino, and San Giorgio La Molara.

The town is located in the Campanian Apennines at an elevation of 601 meters above sea level, in a commanding position over the Miscano Valley. The municipal territory ranges in elevation from a minimum of 249 meters to a maximum of 928 meters.

== Twin towns ==
Casalbore is twinned with:

- Vinovo, Italy (2011)
