= Santa Maria Assunta, Riccia =

Church in Riccia, Italy

Coordinates: 41°29′11.4″N 14°50′13.2″E

Santa Maria Assunta
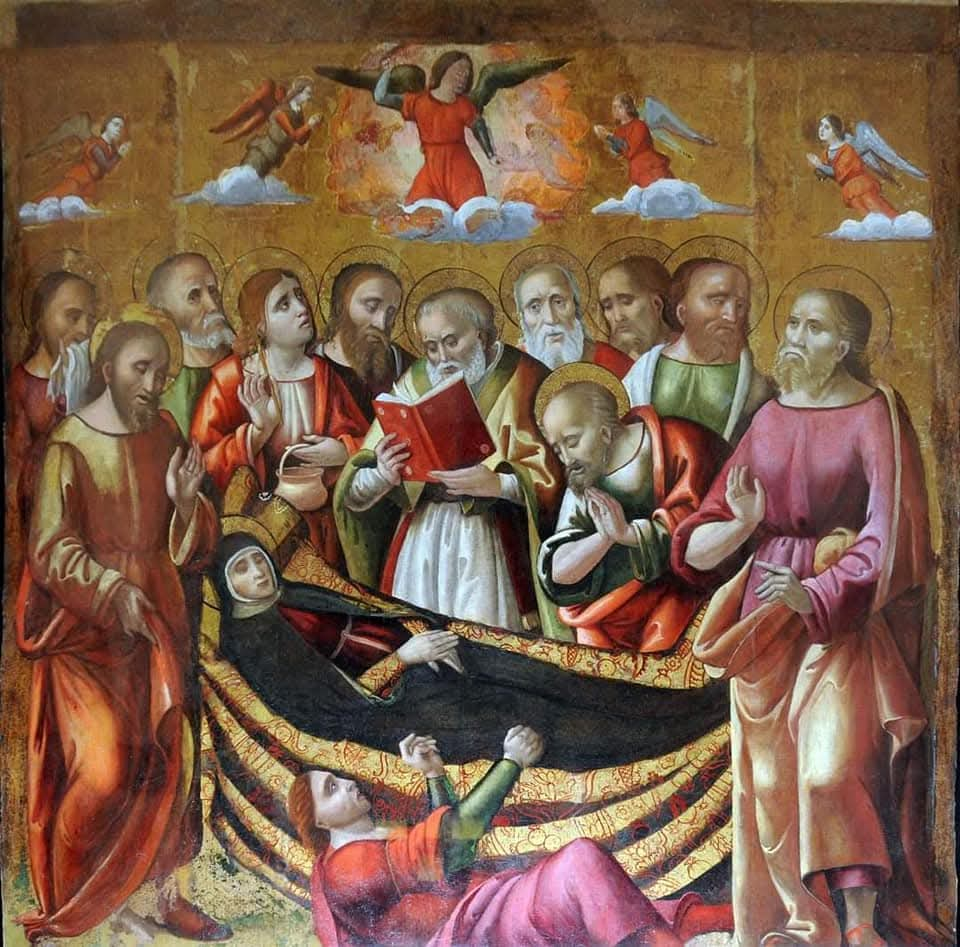
- The fresco Dormitio Virginis (15th Century), by Silvestro Buono, in the church

Religion
- Affiliation: Roman Catholic
- Province: Archdiocese of Campobasso-Boiano
- Region: Molise
- Rite: Latin Rite

Location
- Location: Riccia, Molise
- Interactive map of Santa Maria Assunta

Architecture
- Type: Church

Santa Maria Assunta or the Chiesa dell’Assunta is a Roman Catholic church located in the town of Riccia, Province of Campobasso in the region of Molise, Italy.

== History ==
The church is medieval and rebuilt and enlarged in the 18th century with reconsecration in 1765.

The Romanesque-style portal derives from the 13th-century has foliage and animal symbols, and in the cornice frieze, it has the heraldic signs of the families of Bartolomeo de Capua and Aurelia Orsini. On the left, at the end of the nave, the ribs of the ceiling of the chapel have gothic-style arches with spiral motifs.

The church contains an altarpiece depicting the Dormition of the Virgin (circa 1480) attributed to Silvestro Buono, a Neapolitan pupil of Antonio Solario. In the opposite wall is the painting of a local hermit, the Blessed Stefano Corumano with Virgin and Child. The main altar was made of marble and pietra dura in the 17th century.

Among the relics of the church are those of San Ciriaco, Santa Massimiliana, San Mercurio, San Timoteo, San Vitale, and the arm of Blessed Stefano Corumano. It is said the relics of San Vitale were obtained in 1755 in Rome from Cardinal Vicario by Nicola de Capua, Administrator of the Prince of Riccia. The relics, collected in a decorated urn, were brought into the church with a great procession. In August 1762, two lightning bolts during a storm hit the belltower, killing three individuals and causing damage to the building, but spared the altar and urn of San Vitale. When the urn was reopened in 1883, an inscription stated: The Holy Body of the Martyr of Christ, San Vitale, was extracted from the Cemetery of S. Saturnino in Via Salaria, with a glass vase containing his glorious blood.

Among the statues in the church was a St Augustine (1726), carved in Naples by the sculptor Giovanni Buonavita. The main altar was built of local stone levigata with intarsia of serpentine marble.

== See also ==
- Santissima Annunciata, Riccia
- Immacolata Concezione, Riccia
- Sanctuary of the Madonna del Carmine, Riccia
- Santa Maria delle Grazie, Riccia
- Monument to the Fallen, Riccia
