= Ernesto Solitario =

Italian sculptor

Ernesto Solitario (born July, 1838) was an Italian sculptor, active mainly in Naples.

He was born in San Giorgio La Molara, Province of Benevento. He studied art in the Academy of Naples and received a stipend from the province. Among his works were a wooden Immacolata for the church of Balam; a St Joseph; a A Holy Family (1859), which won a silver medal at the Exposition of Naples: Three life-sized statues in terra cotta for the church of Saviano; Bacchus with a goat for the City Hall of Campobasso; Neapolian Dress, a bust in terra cotta, awarded silver medal at the Exposition G. B. Vico; Five medallions in Stucco for the archive of San Pietro a Maiella; six archeologic portraits for the hall of medals of the Museo Nazionale of Naples; a marble bust for the Collegio dei Nobili; a bust of Charles III of Naples for the hall of porcelain at Capodimonte Museum. He became professor of plastics and design for the Albergo dei Poveri in Naples
