= San Giorgio La Molara =

- Comune
- Comune di San Giorgio La Molara
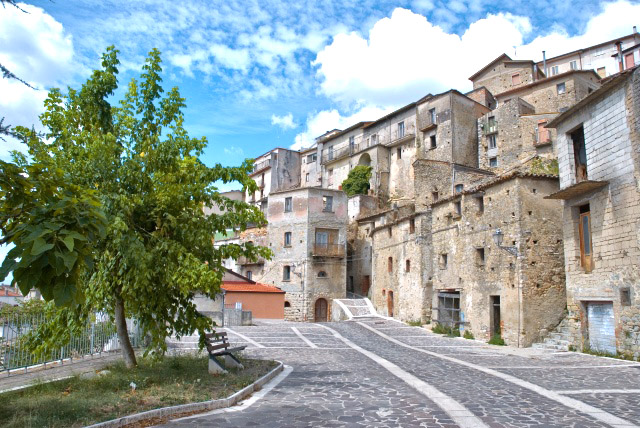

- Location within Italy Location within Campania
- Coordinates: 41°16′N 14°55′E
- Country: Italy
- Region: Campania
- Province: Benevento (BN)
- Frazioni: Cardito

Government
  - Mayor: Nicola De Vizio

Area
  - Total: 65.77 km^{2} (25.39 sq mi)
- Elevation: 667 m (2,188 ft)

Population (1 January 2015)
  - Total: 3,005
  - Density: 45.69/km^{2} (118.3/sq mi)
- Demonym: Sangiorgesi
- Time zone: UTC+1 (CET)
  - Summer (DST): UTC+2 (CEST)
- Postal code: 82020
- Dialing code: 0824
- Website: Official website

San Giorgio La Molara is a comune (municipality) in the Province of Benevento in the Italian region Campania, located about 70 kilometres (43 mi) northeast of Naples and about 20 kilometres (12 mi) northeast of Benevento.

San Giorgio La Molara borders the following municipalities: Buonalbergo, Casalbore, Foiano di Val Fortore, Ginestra degli Schiavoni, Molinara, Montefalcone di Val Fortore, Paduli, Pago Veiano, San Marco dei Cavoti. Many inhabitants of San Giorgio La Molara emigrated to South Australia after the Second World War due to the lack of employment opportunities in Southern Italy in the post-war period.

== Notable people ==
- Ernesto Solitario (born 1838), sculptor
