= Porpora Marcasciano =

Italian activist and writer (born 1957)

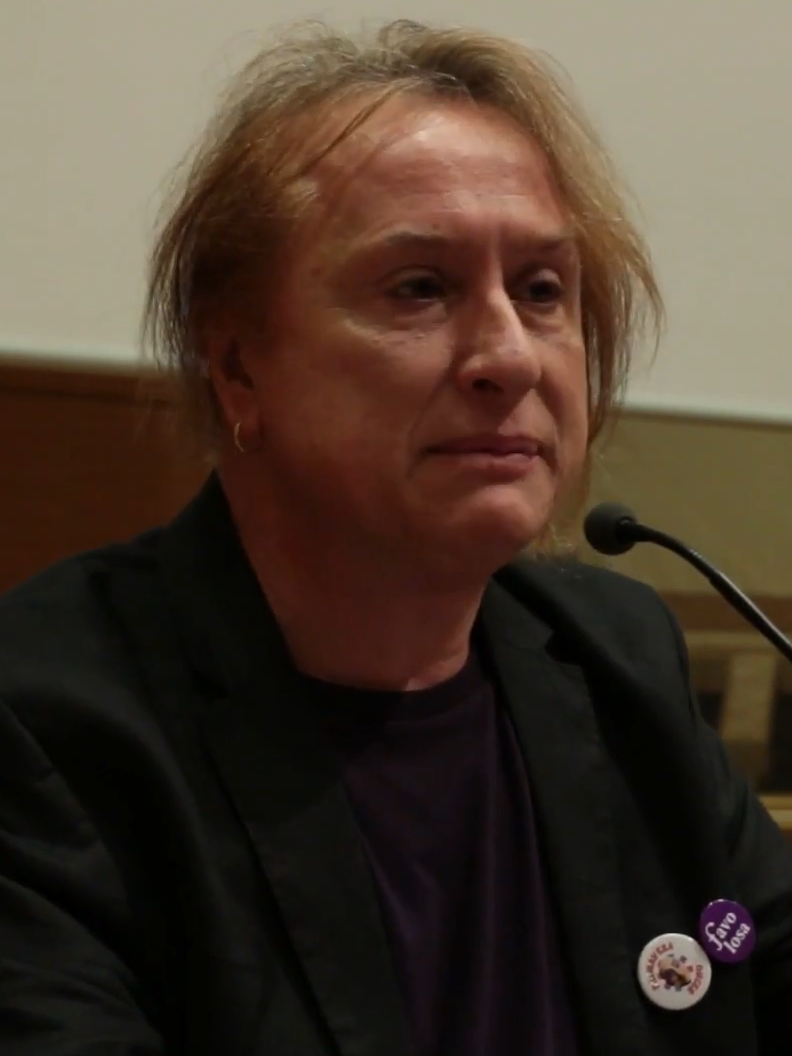
- Marcasciano in 2014
- Born: 15 September 1957 (age 68); San Bartolomeo in Galdo, Italy
- Education: Sapienza University of Rome (Degree in Sociology)
- Occupations: Activist; Writer
- Known for: peace activist and LGBT rights activism in Italy
- Notable work: AntoloGaia; Favolose narranti; Aurora delle trans cattive
- Awards: Human Rights Defender award (2016) of Amnesty International

Porpora Marcasciano (San Bartolomeo in Galdo, 15 September 1957) is an Italian activist, sociologist, and writer, known for her militantism for LGBT+ and transgender rights and internationally recognized books, including AntoloGaia. Sesso, genere e cultura degli anni '70, L'aurora delle trans cattive and the autobiographic Tra le rose e le viole. La storia e le storie di transessuali e travestiti. Through her activist efforts and books, she addresses several issues, including the right to identification, the right to education and employment, health rights for the LGBT+ community (including training for medical professionals), and the social and law enforcement abuses faced by transgender individuals, as well as detention conditions in prisons. Elle reported she was the first transgender person to be nominated for the 2025 Nobel Peace Prize

She is currently president of Movimento Identità Trans, the oldest trans movement in Italy, and an elected member of the city council of Bologna. In the 70s she was arrested in Rome for wearing women’s clothes; during the elections in Bologna, she was a victim of deadnaming and obliged to run for elections under her birth name.

== Biography and activism ==
She was born in a rural village in the province of Benevento in southern Italy and moved to Rome at a young age to study sociology at the University of Rome La Sapienza. During that period, she began wearing make up and women's clothing. One day, while returning home from classes at La Sapienza, she was arrested at Piazza dei Cinquecento in Roma Termini Station for wearing such attire. She described the experience as both a catalyst for her activism and a deeply traumatizing event, the consequences of which she continues to grapple with. The experience was told in the book Antologaia which is today a text book in University classes in history of LGBT+.

Porpora Marcasciano became an historical trans activist and has been an important figure in the Italian movement from its beginnings within the collectives of the 1970s to the present day. She served as the president of the MIT (Movimento Identità Trans) until 2016. She has authored several essays on the history of the Italian LGBT movement, and among other things, she curated Elementi di critica trans (Manifestolibri, 2010). She chose her name in reference to Porporino, a famous character from Dominique Fernandez's book.

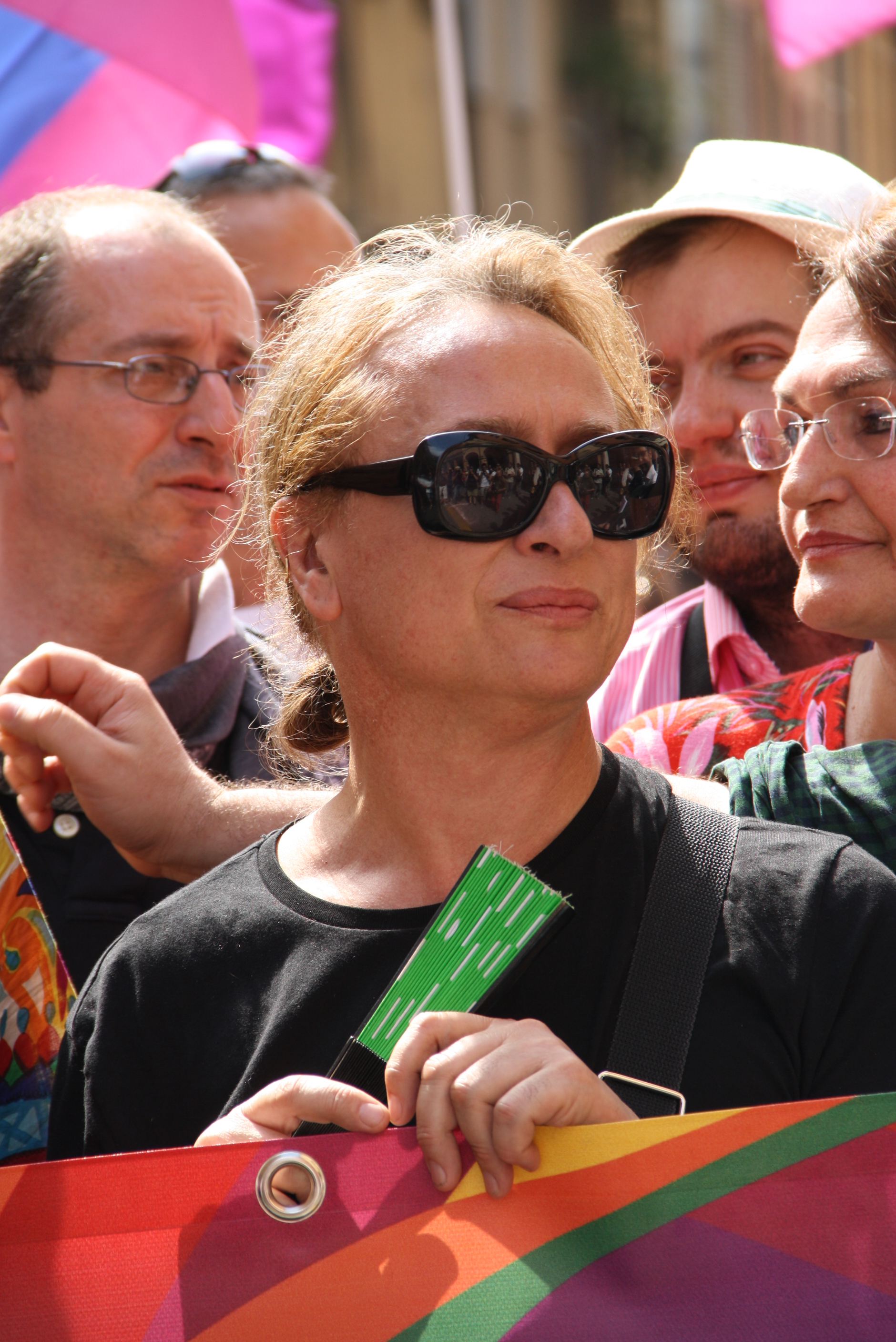
Porpora Marcasciano at Bologna Pride 2012

Marcasciano graduated with a degree in sociology from the University of Rome La Sapienza in 1983. She traces her activism back to 1975, when, following the murder of Pier Paolo Pasolini, the members of the political collective she belonged to asked her to publicly share her story during a school assembly.

Two years later, after the split from the Fuori! movement due to its political alignment with the Radical Party, Porpora, together with Marco Sanna and Enzo Ienna, founded the NARCISO collective (an acronym for Nuclei Armati Rivoluzionari Comunisti Internazionali Sovversivi Omosessuali). This experience lasted until 1983, eventually merging with the Fuori Roman to become the Mario Mieli Circle. On the Fuori split, she stated:

We also felt the need to reaffirm that this formation could not be the only one representing a world that was much more varied. You see, Fuori isolated the homosexual issue from any political or social context. For us, it was a theme directly connected to that broader phenomenon that emerged with the '77 movement, which included Autonomia Operaia, the Metropolitan Indians, transversalists, women, and gays.

As recounted in her book AntoloGaia, during her university years in Rome in 1981, she was arrested for four days on charges of public indecency because she was wearing women's clothing.

From 2005, Marcasciano joined the MIT and the Facciamo Breccia movement, which opposed the Catholic Church's interference in Italian public affairs.

In 2010, after the death of Marcella Di Folco, Marcasciano became the president of MIT until 2016, a role she resumed in 2019.

In 2016, she was awarded Amnesty International's "Human Rights Defender" prize, dedicated to people who are considered invaluable to the human rights movement.

== Publications ==
- Favolose Narranti: Storie di transessuali, Manifestolibri, 2008
- AntoloGaia. Vivere sognando e non sognare di vivere: i miei anni Settanta, éditions Alegre, 2015
- Il Sogno e l'Utopia. Biografia di una generazione, de et avec Porpora Marcasciano, mise en scène de Simone Cangelosi, 2016
- Aurora delle trans cattive. Storie, sguardi e vissuti della mia generazione transgender, éditions Alegre, 2018
- Tra le rose e le viole. La storia e le storie di transessuali e travestiti, éditions Allegre, 2020

=== Details ===
Marcasciano has written several books, recounting the history of the Italian LGBT movement through her personal experience and that of her social network.

In 2008, she wrote Favolose Narranti: Storie di transessuali, which, through the direct testimonies of ten trans women, narrates the birth of the Italian trans movement in relation to the gay, lesbian, and feminist worlds.

Eight years later, she published AntoloGaia. Sesso, genere e cultura degli anni '70, an autobiography that covers the period from the 1970s to 1983. This work recounts the birth of the first Italian pride, the homosexual camps, the arrival of AIDS, and the struggles that led to Law 164 of 1982 on gender transition. The year 1983 marks the end of the story because it coincides with the death of Mario Mieli, whom she personally knew, and the arrival of AIDS in the Italian media.

Antologaia has internationally received highly positive reviews for its authentic portrayal of trans experiences and contributions to LGBTQ+ history in Italy. Critics have praised its exploration of gender, personal identity, and the socio-political context of the time. Notable endorsements include:

- "This trans memoir by Porpora Marcasciano... could not come at a better time." — Bernadette Wegenstein, co editor of Radical Equalities and Global Feminist Filmmaking: An Anthology.
- "Porpora Marcasciano's electrifying memoir is a valuable part of trans history." — Diana Goetsch, author of This Body I Wore: A Memoir.

In 2018, she co-wrote Transformare l'organizzazione dei luoghi di detenzione: persone transgender e gender nonconforming tra diritti e identità and examines how the prison environment interacts with gender identity, focusing on issues of rights, identity, and marginalization. The same year, she wrote L'aurora delle trans cattive, a collective look at the Italian trans movement, in which she also recounts her experiences with the femminielli in Naples and her time in prison in Rome, convicted for wearing women's clothes. This book, along with Antologaia, are also textbooks at the University of Turin in the class of History of Homosexuality.

== Political activity ==
Marcasciano ran for office on the Civic Coalition - Courageous Ecologist Solidarity list in the municipal elections held on October 3–4, 2021, in Bologna. She was elected to the city council as part of the majority. On November 11, 2021, she was elected President of the Equal Opportunities Commission of the Bologna City Council.

== Social and Legal reforms ==
Porpora Marcasciano has made significant contributions to both hard and soft law reforms, particularly concerning transgender rights, LGBTQ+ issues, and broader human rights in Italy. Her activism spans decades, influencing key legal changes and policy initiatives. Some of her notable achievements include:

- Law 164/1982: Marcasciano was actively involved in the protests organized by the Italian Transsexual Movement (MIT), which were instrumental in the passage of Law 164/1982. This groundbreaking legislation, approved on April 14, 1982, allowed individuals to legally rectify their gender identity, marking a crucial victory for transgender rights in Italy.
- Law No. 66/1996: She also contributed to the approval of this legislation, which redefined sexual violence as a crime against honor, specifically acknowledging violence against women as a criminal offense, a vital step towards gender equality and women's rights.
- Anti-Trafficking Efforts: As a member of the National Anti-Trafficking Network, Marcasciano has worked tirelessly to combat human trafficking and exploitation. Her contributions have been both practical and political, involving direct advocacy and grassroots action to protect vulnerable populations, particularly in the sex work community.
- Harm Reduction Strategy (1994–2024): Since 1994, Marcasciano has designed and implemented a harm reduction strategy within the context of prostitution, initially as a volunteer for MIT and later through projects supported by the Municipality of Bologna and the Emilia Romagna Region. This strategy focused on reducing risks and improving the safety of sex workers over the span of three decades.
- Law No. 40/2004: Marcasciano played an active role in the approval of this law, which introduced regulations concerning medically assisted procreation, reflecting her broader commitment to reproductive rights and healthcare access for all.
- Court of Cassation Ruling (2015): In 2015, Marcasciano's activism contributed to a major legal victory when the Court of Cassation ruled that transgender individuals could change their names without undergoing surgical intervention (Ruling No. 15138/2015). This ruling expanded personal autonomy and rights for the trans community in Italy.
- Cirinnà Law (2016): Marcasciano was a key figure in the mobilization efforts that led to the passage of Law No. 76/2016, known as the Cirinnà Law, which legalized civil unions between same-sex couples and provided a legal framework for cohabitation. This law was a significant milestone for LGBTQ+ rights in Italy.
- Zan Bill (2021): In 2021, she was actively involved in the advocacy for the approval of the Zan Bill, a proposed law aimed at combating homophobic and transphobic violence. Despite its rejection in October 2021, Marcasciano's efforts highlighted the ongoing fight for LGBTQ+ protections in the legal system.
- Bologna HIV Friendly – FAST TRACK CITY (2022): As a council member in Bologna, she proposed and successfully passed a resolution for Bologna to become an HIV Friendly Fast Track City, committing the city to address and reduce HIV transmission.
- Alias Careers and No Gender Bathrooms (2023–2024): Most recently, Marcasciano was instrumental in proposing and passing policies in Bologna's City Council to introduce "Alias Careers" for universities, libraries, and public services, allowing individuals to use chosen names. She also championed the introduction of No Gender bathrooms in public facilities, furthering inclusivity and recognition of non-binary and transgender rights.

Marcasciano's activism, spanning from the 1970s to the present, has been pivotal in shaping Italy's legal and social landscape for transgender and LGBTQ+ individuals, making her a central figure in the country's human rights movement.

== Awards and recognition ==
- 2016 – Human Rights Defender Award, Amnesty International.
- 2023 – Rainbow Awards, Premio community.
- 2025 – Nominated for the Nobel Peace Prize.
- 2026 – Premi Roma Pride, Lifetime Achievement Award / Premio alla carriera.

== Other works ==
=== Theatrical works ===
- Il Sogno e l'Utopia. Biografia di una generazione, written and performed by Porpora Marcasciano, directed by Simone Cangelosi, 2016.

=== Movie ===
She is part of the engaged movie Le Favolose, presented at Outfest in Los Angeles.

=== Documentary ===
A documentary had been deficated to her life, called « Porpora ». It is used also in campaigns to raise awareness on LGBT+ conditions, as Deloitte did for its employees in the 2024 Pride Month.
