= Montefalcone di Val Fortore =

- Comune
- Comune di Montefalcone di Val Fortore
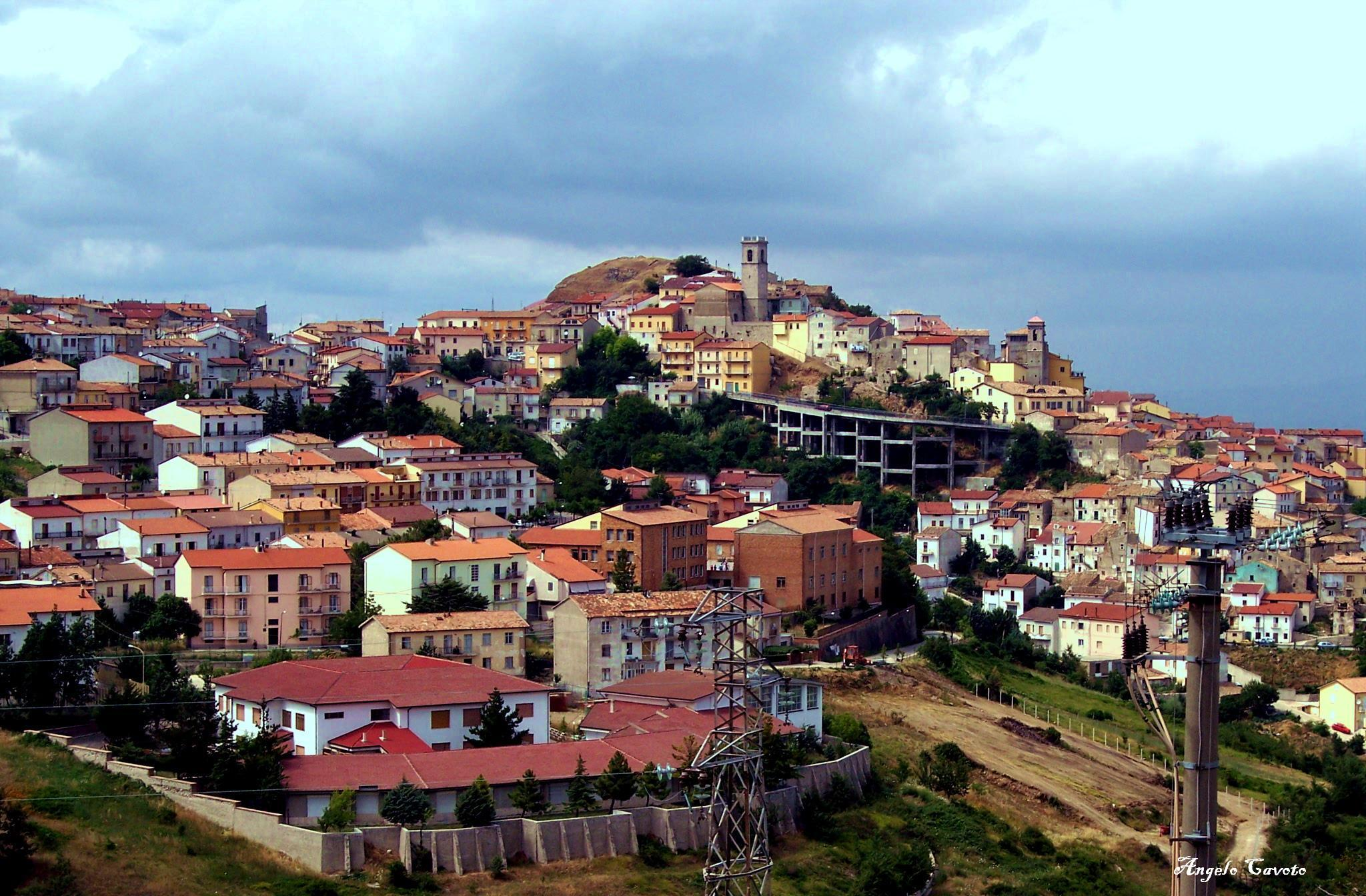

- Location within Italy Location within Campania
- Coordinates: 41°19′N 15°1′E
- Country: Italy
- Region: Campania
- Province: Benevento (BN)

Government
  - Mayor: Michele Leonardo Sacchetti

Area
  - Total: 41.94 km^{2} (16.19 sq mi)
- Elevation: 817 m (2,680 ft)

Population (1 January 2020)
  - Total: 1,405
  - Density: 33.50/km^{2} (86.77/sq mi)
- Demonym: Montefalconesi
- Time zone: UTC+1 (CET)
  - Summer (DST): UTC+2 (CEST)
- Postal code: 82025
- Dialing code: 0824
- ISTAT code: 062042
- Patron saint: Our Lady of Mount Carmel
- Saint day: 16 July
- Website: Official website

Montefalcone di Val Fortore is a comune (municipality) in the Province of Benevento in the Italian region Campania, located about 80 km northeast of Naples and about 30 km northeast of Benevento.

Montefalcone di Val Fortore is part of the Roman Catholic Diocese of Ariano Irpino-Lacedonia and its territory borders the following municipalities: Castelfranco in Miscano, Foiano di Val Fortore, Ginestra degli Schiavoni, Roseto Valfortore, San Giorgio La Molara.
