= San Martino Valle Caudina =

- Comune
- Comune di San Martino Valle Caudina
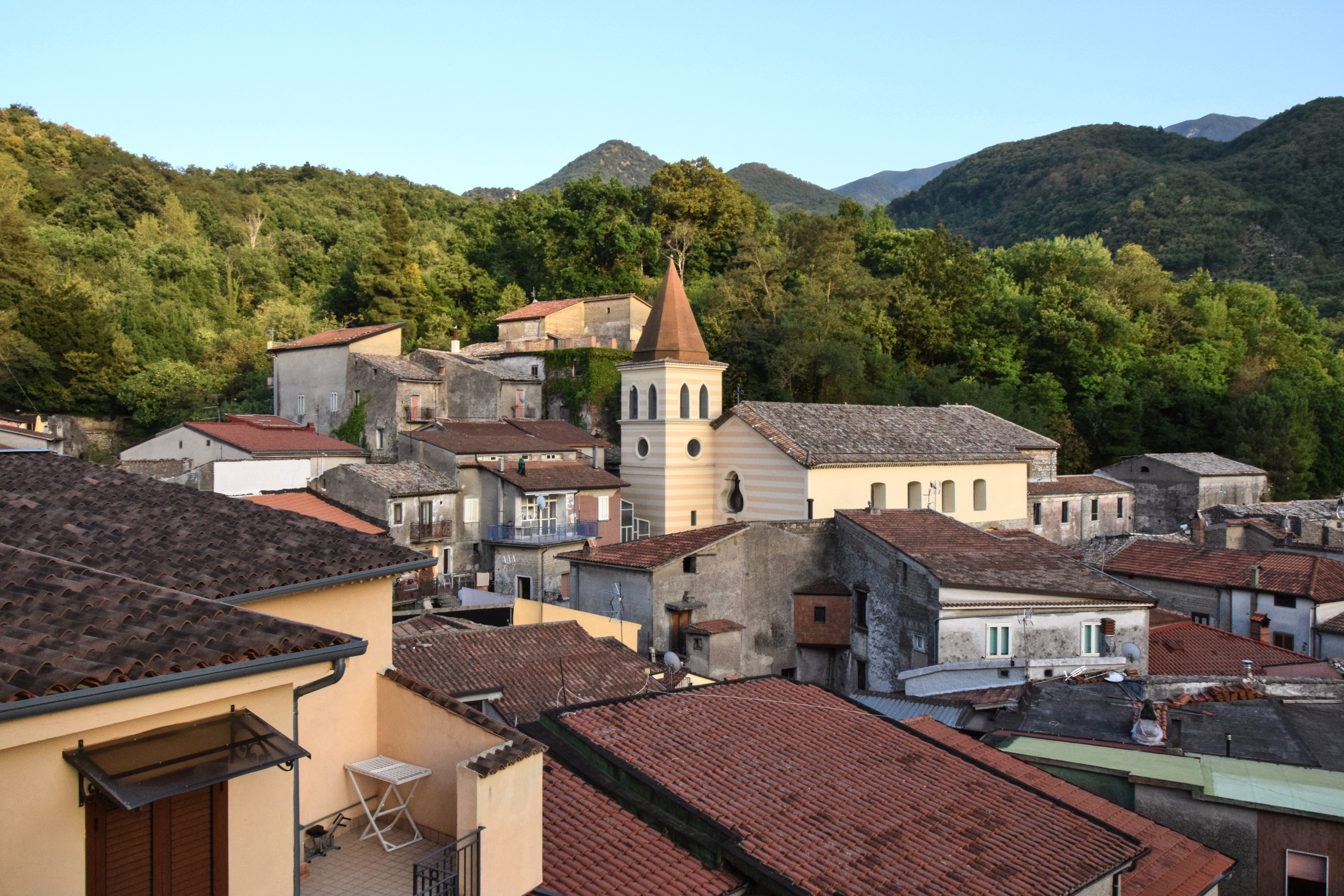

- Coat of arms

- Location within Italy Location within Campania
- Coordinates: 41°1′30″N 14°39′45″E
- Country: Italy
- Region: Campania
- Province: Avellino (AV)
- Frazioni: Campanino, Carcarella, Casadami, Clementi, Crocevia, Girone, Iardino, Innocenzi, La Pietra, Mancini, Masseria Teti, Poeti, Quercino, Rocchi, San Palerio, Stazione di San Martino Valle Caudina (Scalo), Tedeschi, Tufara, Vernilli, Vitaliani

Government
  - Mayor: Pasquale Pisano

Area
  - Total: 22 km^{2} (8.5 sq mi)
- Elevation: 315 m (1,033 ft)

Population (1 May 2009)
  - Total: 4,710
  - Density: 210/km^{2} (550/sq mi)
- Demonym: Sammartinesi or Sanmartinesi
- Time zone: UTC+1 (CET)
  - Summer (DST): UTC+2 (CEST)
- Postal code: 83018
- Dialing code: 0824
- ISTAT code: 064083
- Patron saint: San Martino di Tours
- Saint day: 11 November
- Website: Official website

San Martino Valle Caudina is a town and comune in the province of Avellino, Campania, Italy.
