= Sant'Arcangelo Trimonte =

- Comune
- Comune di Sant'Arcangelo Trimonte
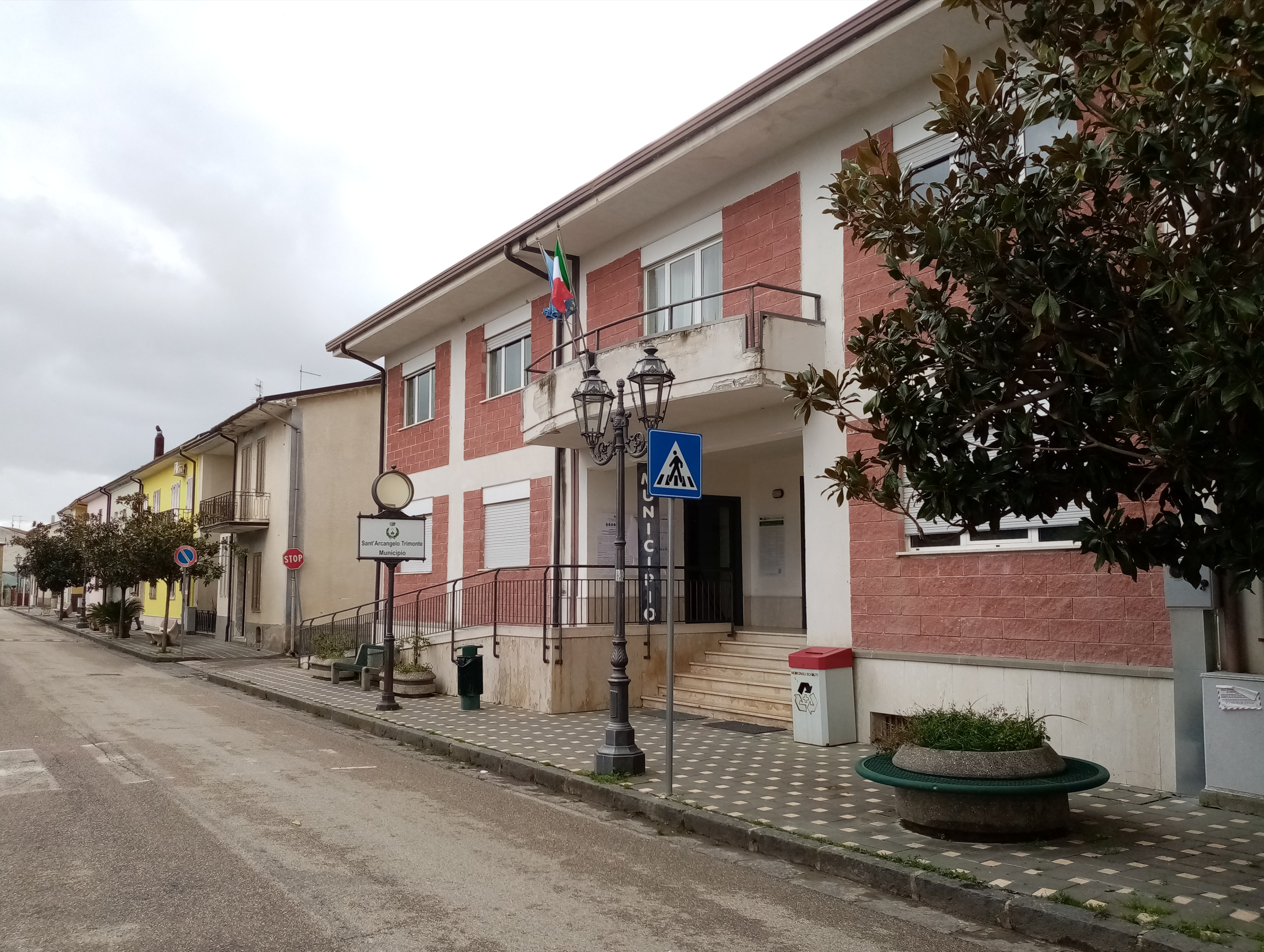
- The town hall

- Location within Italy Location within Campania
- Coordinates: 41°9′55″N 14°56′18″E
- Country: Italy
- Region: Campania
- Province: Benevento (BN)

Government
  - Mayor: Romeo Pisani

Area
  - Total: 9.8 km^{2} (3.8 sq mi)
- Elevation: 363 m (1,191 ft)

Population (31 March 2015)
  - Total: 591
  - Density: 60/km^{2} (160/sq mi)
- Demonym: Santarcangiolesi
- Time zone: UTC+1 (CET)
  - Summer (DST): UTC+2 (CEST)
- Postal code: 82020
- Dialing code: 0824
- Website: Official website

Sant'Arcangelo Trimonte is a comune (municipality) in the Province of Benevento in the Italian region Campania, located about 70 km (43 mi) northeast of Naples and about 13 km (8.1 mi) east of Benevento.

Sant'Arcangelo Trimonte was part of Province of Avellino until 1978; its territory borders the following municipalities: Apice, Buonalbergo, Paduli.
