= Castelvetere in Val Fortore =

- Comune
- Comune di Castelvetere in Val Fortore
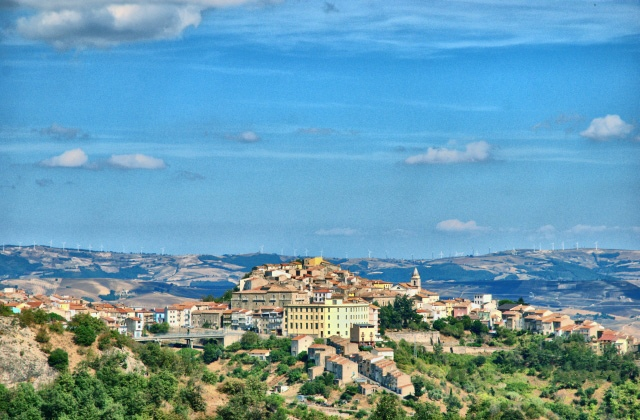

- Location within Italy Location within Campania
- Coordinates: 41°27′N 14°56′E
- Country: Italy
- Region: Campania
- Province: Benevento (BN)

Government
  - Mayor: Gianfranco Mottola

Area
  - Total: 34.58 km^{2} (13.35 sq mi)
- Elevation: 706 m (2,316 ft)

Population (1 January 2021)
  - Total: 1,094
  - Density: 31.64/km^{2} (81.94/sq mi)
- Demonym: Castelvetresi
- Time zone: UTC+1 (CET)
  - Summer (DST): UTC+2 (CEST)
- Postal code: 82023
- Dialing code: 0824
- ISTAT code: 062020
- Patron saint: St. Nicholas
- Website: Official website

Castelvetere in Val Fortore is a comune (municipality) in the Province of Benevento in the Italian region Campania, located about 90 km (56 mi) northeast of Naples and about 35 km (22 mi) northeast of Benevento in the upper valley of the Fortore River (Sannio).

== Main sights ==
- Remains of the defensive tower
- Portal of the church of St. Nicholas, with some fine sculptures
- Palazzo Marchesale (18th century)
- Communal Villa (garden)
