= San Bartolomeo in Galdo =

- Comune
- Comune di San Bartolomeo in Galdo
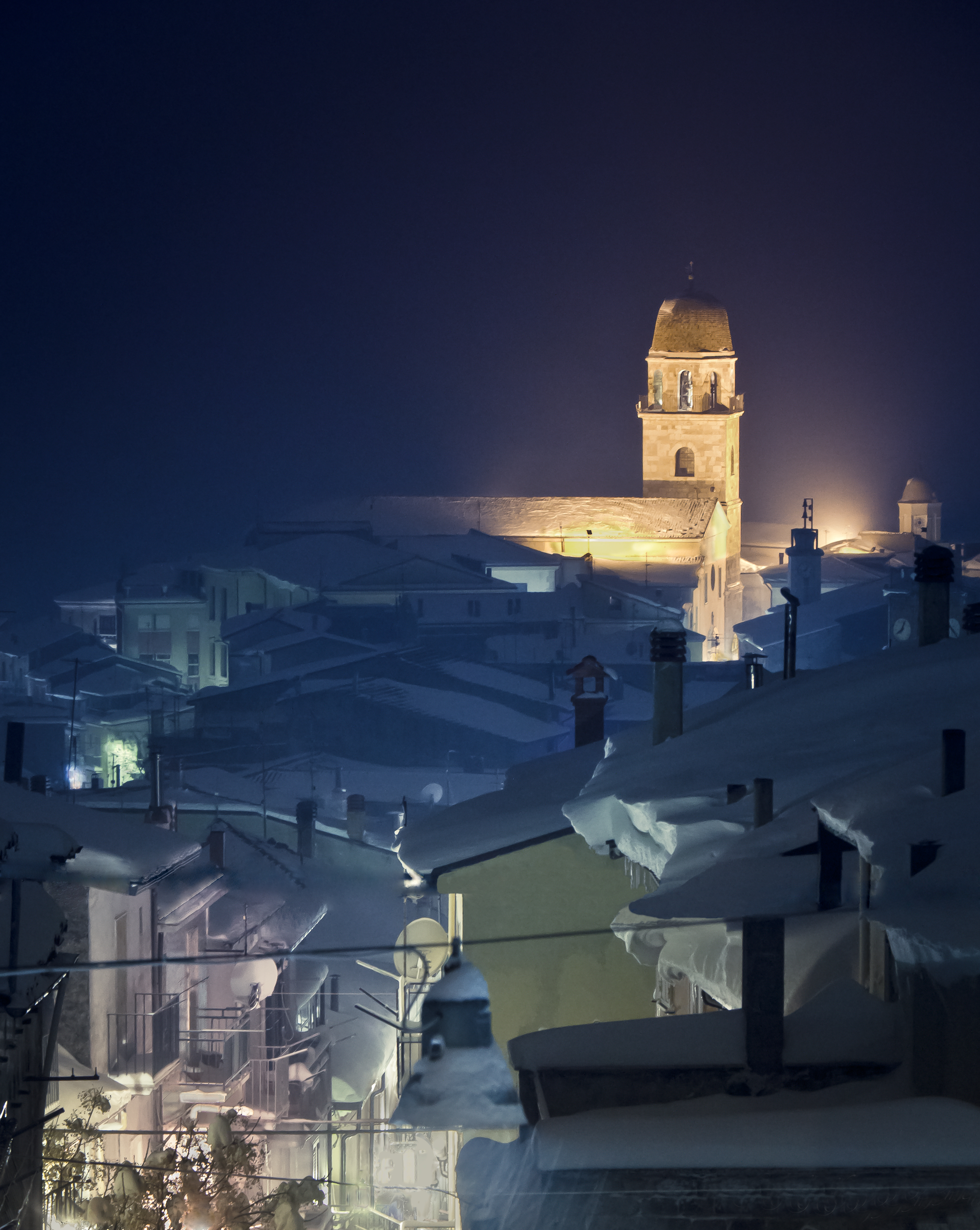

- Location within Italy Location within Campania
- Coordinates: 41°25′N 15°1′E
- Country: Italy
- Region: Campania
- Province: Benevento (BN)

Government
  - Mayor: Carmine Agostinelli

Area
  - Total: 82.67 km^{2} (31.92 sq mi)
- Elevation: 597 m (1,959 ft)

Population (30 June 2015)
  - Total: 4,884
  - Density: 59.08/km^{2} (153.0/sq mi)
- Demonym: Sanbartolomeani
- Time zone: UTC+1 (CET)
  - Summer (DST): UTC+2 (CEST)
- Postal code: 82028
- Dialing code: 0824
- Patron saint: St. Bartholomew the Apostle
- Saint day: August 24
- Website: Official website

San Bartolomeo in Galdo is a comune (municipality) in the Province of Benevento in the Italian region Campania, located about 90 km northeast of Naples and about 35 km northeast of Benevento, on a hill overlooking the valley of the Fortore river.

== Overview ==
The economy is mostly based on agriculture. San Bartolomeo lost some half of its population after World War II, due to extensive emigration.

The climate is sub-continental, with hot and dry summers, long and cold winters with extensive snowfalls. The average temperatures are +17/+27,5 °C in July, and +1,5/+6 °C in January. The town's greatest son was Rocky Marciano, born Rocco Marchegiano. His mother was Pasqualina Picciuto who immigrated from San Bartolomeo in Galdo to Brockton, Massachusetts with husband Pierino Marchegiano (from Ripa Teatina, Abruzzo).

=== Notable people ===
- Porpora Marcasciano

== Main sights ==
- Chiesa Madre ("Mother Church"), with early-15th century two portals taken from the badia of Santa Maria a Mazzocca.
- Church of the Annunziata, also characterized by a portal from 1498.
- Baroque convent of the Minor Friars (17th century).
