= Diocese of Aquino e Pontecorvo =

The Diocese of Aquino e Pontecorvo (Latin: Dioecesis Aquinatensis et Pontiscurvi) was a Roman Catholic diocese in Italy, located in the city of Aquino in the province of Frosinone, in the Lazio region. In 1818, it was suppressed to the Diocese of Sora-Cassino-Aquino-Pontecorvo.

== History ==
- 450: Established as Diocese of Aquino
- 1725 June 23: Name changed to Diocese of Aquino e Pontecorvo (Aquinatensis et Pontiscurvi)
- 27 June 1818: United with Diocese of Sora to form Diocese of Aquino, Sora, e Pontecorvo

== Ordinaries ==
=== Diocese of Aquino ===
Latin Name: Aquinatensis
Erected: 5th Century

- Gregoire (2 Apr 1206–1225?)
- unnamed, possibly Robert of Nantes (1225-1235)

...

- Roberto Caracciolo, O.F.M. (25 Oct 1475 – 8 Mar 1484 Appointed, Bishop of Lecce)
- Bernardino Lunati (10 Jul 1495 – 13 Nov 1495 Resigned)
- Battista Del Bufalo (13 Nov 1495 – 1513 Died)
- Giacomo Gherardi (1513 – Sep 1516 Died)
- Mario Maffei (5 Nov 1516 – 9 Sep 1524 Appointed, Bishop of Cavaillon)
- Antonio de Corrago (7 Apr 1525 – 1528 Died)
- Iñigo de Avalos, O.S.B. (4 Sep 1528 – 1543 Died)
- Galeazzo Florimonte (4 May 1543 – 22 Oct 1552 Appointed, Bishop of Sessa Aurunca)
- Adriano Fuscone (22 Oct 1552 – 3 Mar 1579 Died)
- Giovanni Luigi Guarini (30 Mar 1579 – Nov 1579 Died)
- Flaminio Filonardi (13 Nov 1579 – 12 Sep 1608 Died)
- Filippo Filonardi (24 Nov 1608 – 18 May 1615 Resigned)
- Alessandro Filonardi (18 May 1615 – 21 Jan 1645 Died)
- Angelo Maldachini, O.P. (15 May 1645 – 19 Nov 1646 Appointed, Bishop of San Severino)
- Francesco Antonio Depace (3 Dec 1646 – 1655 Died)
- Marcello Filonardi (11 Oct 1655 – May 1689 Died)
- Giovanni Ferrari (bishop) (17 Apr 1690 – 11 May 1699 Died)
- Giuseppe de Carolis (5 Oct 1699 – 5 Jan 1742 Died)

=== Diocese of Aquino e Pontecorvo ===
Name Changed: 23 June 1725

- Francesco Antonio Spadea (22 Jan 1742 – 14 Apr 1751 Resigned)
- Giacinto Sardi (5 Jul 1751 – 25 Sep 1786 Died)
- Antonio Siciliani, C.R.L. (27 Feb 1792 Confirmed – 16 Feb 1795 Died)
- Giuseppe Maria de Mellis (29 Jan 1798 Confirmed – 1814 Died)

== See also ==
- Catholic Church in Italy
