= Della Leonessa =

Italian noble family

Della Leonessa Italian: Casa della Leonessa
- Italian noble family
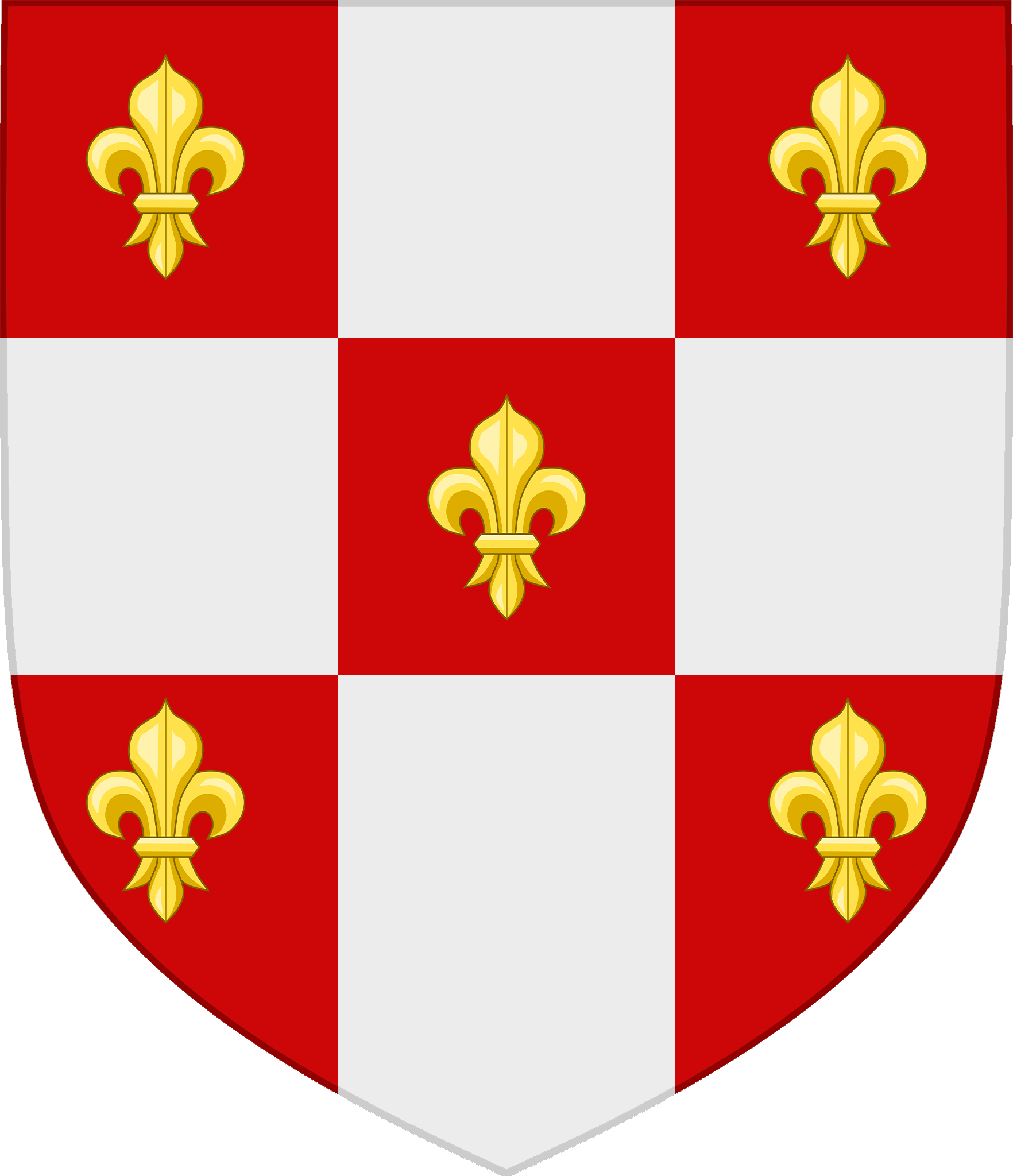
- Country: France; Italy Former countries: Kingdom of France; Kingdom of Italy
- Titles: Prince; Duke; Count; Baron; Lord

The Della Leonessa family (also known as De Lagonissa, Lagonissa, Lagonessa, Lagonesse, or La Gonessa) was an Italian and French noble family of Gothic origin.

== History ==
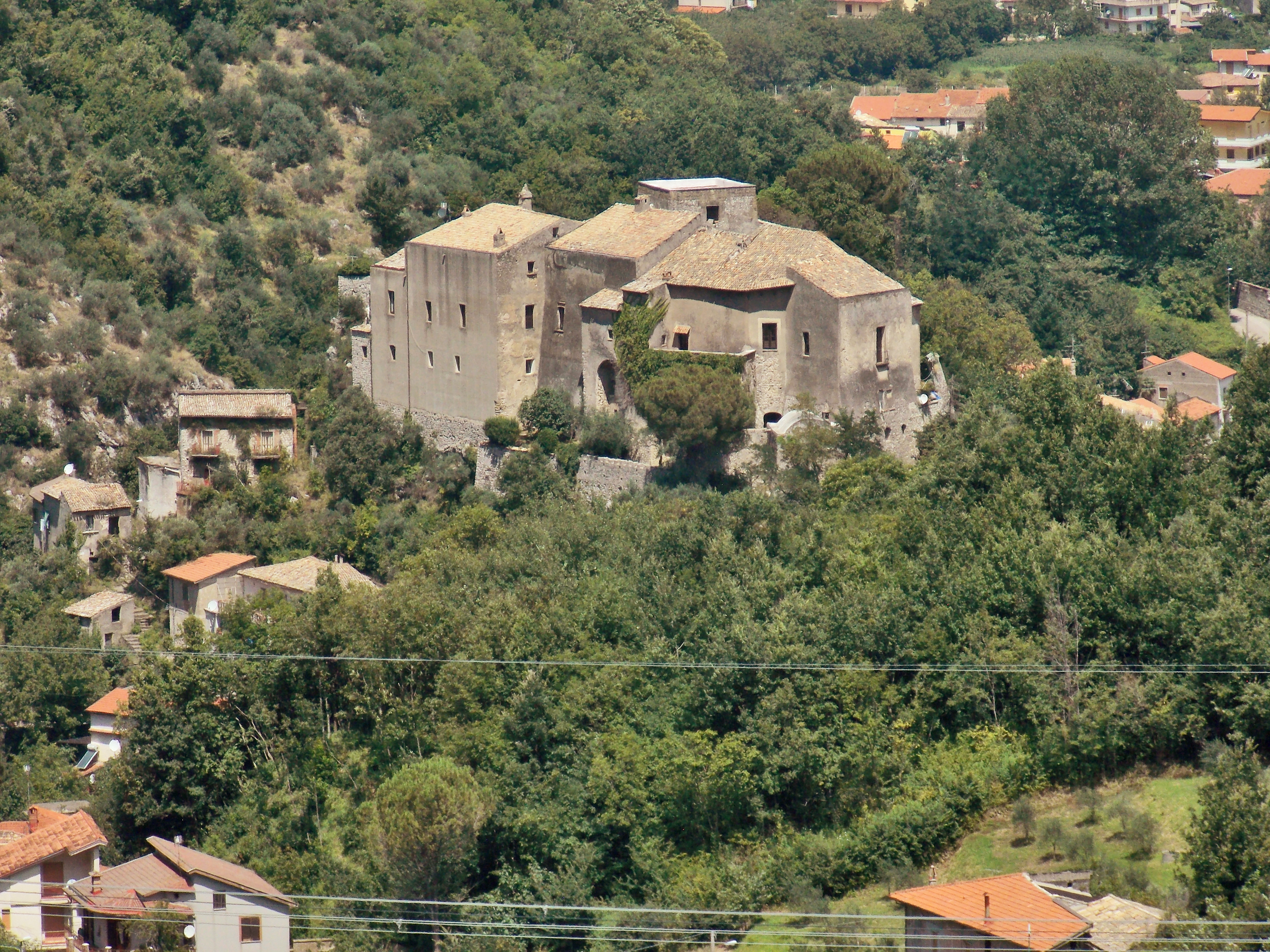
Pignatelli della Leonessa Castle, San Martino Valle Caudina

The Della Leonessa family was a noble family of the Kingdom of Naples, belonging to the Sedile di Capuana. It also enjoyed nobility in Benevento and Capua. It became a protagonist of the historical events of southern Italy under the Angevin dynasty and many of its members held high-level public offices; it also enjoyed the right to mint coins with its own family crest. After the Battle of Benevento in 1266, King Charles I of Anjou granted Guglielmo "William" Della Leonessa the Lordships of Airola and Montesarchio. Later the family also obtained San Martino Valle Caudina and numerous other fiefs, to finally reach a total of one principality, two duchies, three counties and sixty-eight baronies. The branch of the Princes of Sepino and Dukes of San Martino Valle Caudina became extinct in 1816 with Giuseppe Maria II. The latter's aunt, Carlotta (1746–1838), inherited his titles and assets. She married Falco Ruffo, Prince of Scilla. The latter's son, Raffaele (1780–1847), added his mother's surname to his own, having as his only daughter and heir, Maria Carolina Ruffo-Della Leonessa. In 1834, she married Giovanni Pignatelli, 4th Prince of Monteroduni, who added the surname Della Leonessa to his, thus creating the branch of Pignatelli-Della Leonessa.

== Notable members ==
- Riccardo "Richard", Knight at the time of the Manfred, King of Sicily. (Note: He was Lord of San Nicandro Garganico.)
- Filippo "Philip" of Lagonesse, Marshal of the Kingdom of Sicily and Vicar General of the Principality of Achaea. (Note: He was Lord of San Nicandro Garganico.)
- Carlo "Charles", Grand Seneschal of the Kingdom of Sicily. (Note: He was Baron of Finocchito and Lord of Airola, Baiano, Castelfranci, Montefusco and Montesarchio. He married Caterina d'Aquino.)
- Guglielmo "William", Knight, Marshal of the Kingdom of Naples and Viceroy in Provence. (Note: He was Lord of San Nicandro Garganico.)
- Fabio Lagonissa (c. 1584–1659) was an Italian bishop and papal diplomat. (Note: He was the 5th Lord of Airola, Baiano, Campora, Castelfranci, Cervinara, Montemarano, Montesarchio, Pannarano, Salpe and San Martino Valle Caudina.)

== Coat of arms ==
The coat of arms of the Della Leonessa family were red and silver chequered with nine parts, the five red ones each charged with a golden lily and wrapped in a cloak surmounted by a prince's crown, the highest noble title achieved by it. The Angevin lilies were made to the Knight, Guglielmo Della Leonessa, added by concession of the King Charles I of Anjou.
