= Deposition of Christ (Ribera) =

Painting by Jusepe de Ribera

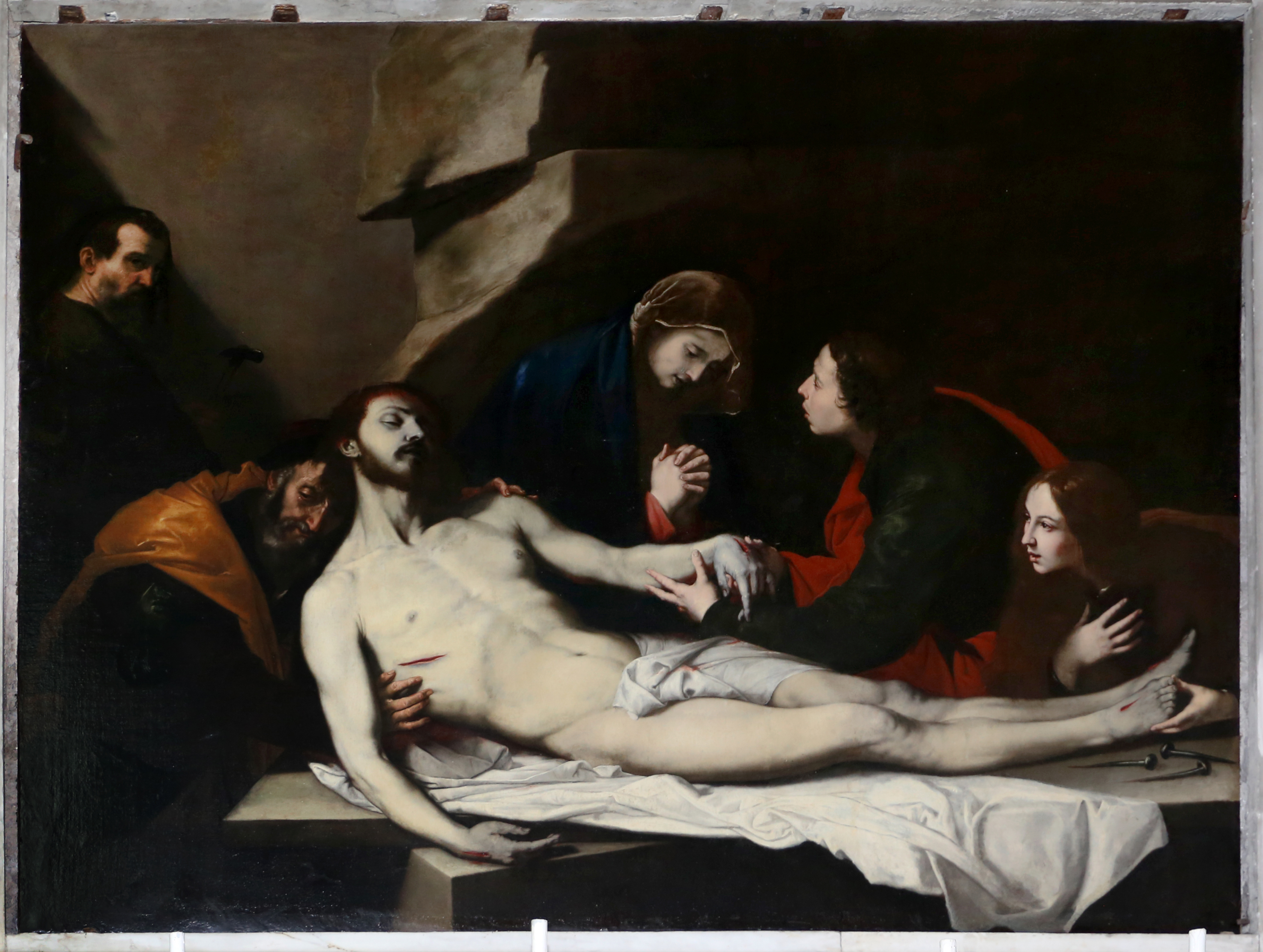
- Artist: Jusepe de Ribera
- Year: early 17th century
- Medium: oil on canvas
- Location: Santissima Maria Assunta and San Catello Co-Cathedral, Castellammare di Stabia

Deposition of Christ is an early 17th-century painting by Jusepe de Ribera It was found on the altar of the Ara Pacis chapel in the co-cathedral of Castellammare di Stabia by count Vincenzo Coppola and donated by him to the bishop of the Diocese of Castellamare di Stabia. It is now in the Santissima Maria Assunta and San Catello Co-Cathedral in Castellammare di Stabia.
