= Massimiliano Palumbara =

The Most Reverend Massimiliano Palumbara
- Archbishop of Benevento
- Church: Catholic Church
- Archdiocese: Archdiocese of Benevento
- In office: 1574–1607
- Predecessor: Giacomo Savelli
- Successor: Pompeio Arrigoni

Orders
- Consecration: 26 Sep 1574 by Giulio Antonio Santorio

Personal details
- Died: 23 January 1607 Benevento, Italy

Massimiliano Palumbara or Massimiliano Palombella (died 23 Jan 1607) was a Roman Catholic prelate who served as Archbishop of Benevento (1574–1607). He was the nephew of Cardinal Giacomo Savelli, his predecessor as Archbishop, through his sister.

== Biography ==
Massimiliano Palumbara was appointed Archbishop in the Consistory of 17 May 1574 by Pope Gregory XIII. On 26 Sep 1574, he was consecrated bishop in Rome in the church of San Francesco a Ripa by Giulio Antonio Santorio, Cardinal-Priest of San Bartolomeo all'Isola, with Giovanni Andrea Croce, Bishop of Tivoli, and Alfonso Binarini, Bishop of Camerino, serving as co-consecrators.

He served as Archbishop of Benevento until his death on 23 Jan 1607. On 29 September 1599, he held a provincial synod, attended by seven of his suffragan bishops, who decided that the abuse should be suppressed in which the clergy would remove relics of saints from their cases and allow them to be touched by lay people.

He died on 23 January 1607 at the age of 33, and was interred in the Chapel of S. Antonio of Padua in the Cathedral.

While bishop, he was the principal co-consecrator of Flaminio Filonardi, Bishop of Aquino (1579); Scipione Gesualdo, Archbishop of Conza (1585); and Enrico Caetani, Titular Patriarch of Alexandria (1585).

== External links and additional sources ==
- Ughelli, Ferdinando; Coleti, Nicolaus (1721). Italia sacra, sive de episcopis Italiae, et insularum adjacentium (in Latin). Vol. Tomus octavus (8). Venezia: Apud Sebastianum Coleti. pp. 3–188.
- Cheney, David M. "Archdiocese of Benevento". Catholic-Hierarchy.org. (for Chronology of Bishops) ^{[self-published]}
- Chow, Gabriel. "Archdiocese of Benevento (Italy)". GCatholic.org. (for Chronology of Bishops) ^{[self-published]}

Catholic Church titles
Preceded by Giacomo Savelli	Archbishop of Benevento; 1574–1607	Succeeded by Pompeio Arrigoni
