= Pasquale Cascio =

Italian ordinary of the Catholic Church

His Excellency, The Most Reverend Pasquale Cascio
- Archbishop of Sant'Angelo dei Lombardi-Conza-Nusco-Bisaccia
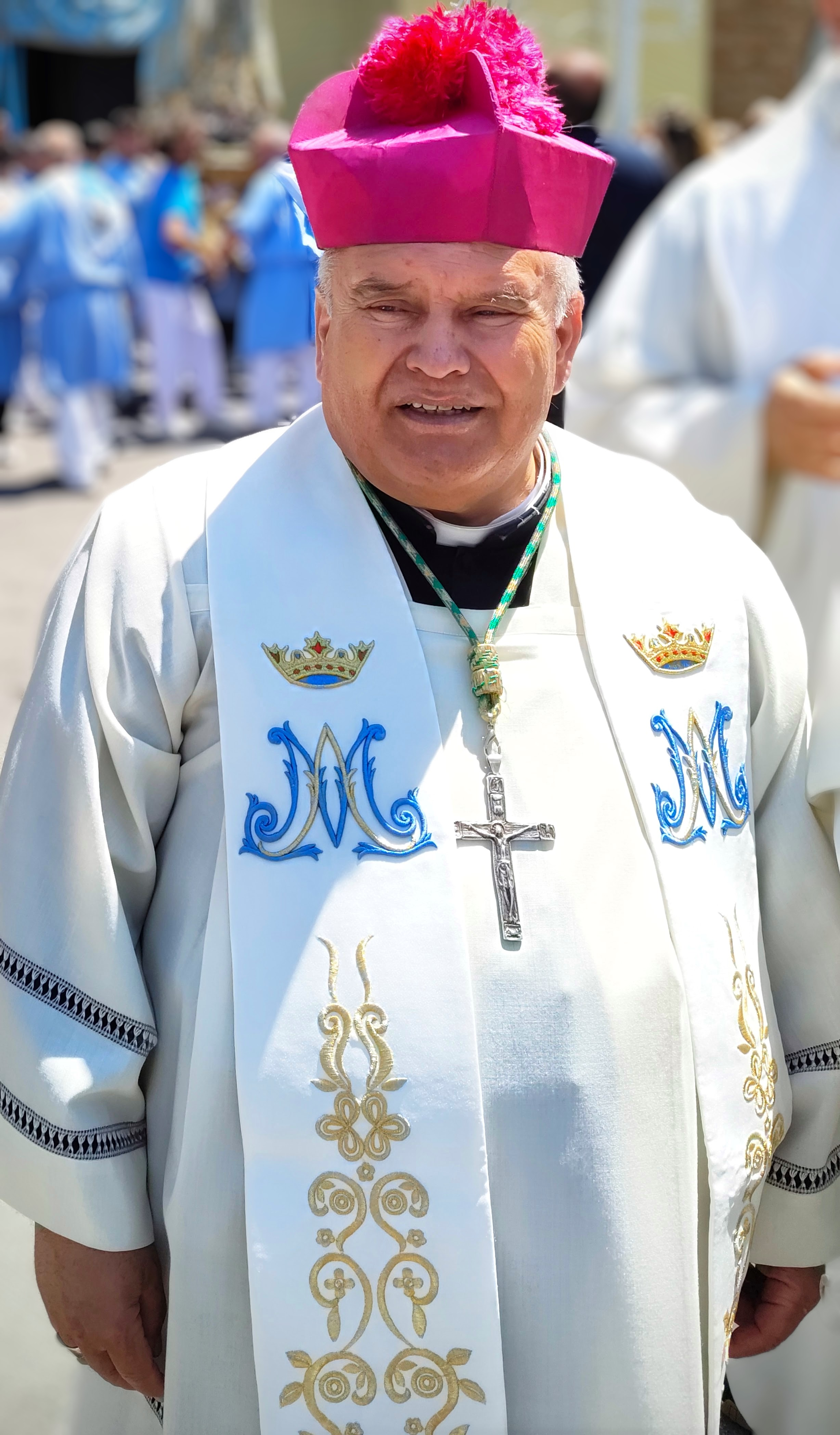
- Archdiocese: Sant'Angelo dei Lombardi-Conza-Nusco-Bisaccia
- Appointed: 27 October 2012
- Installed: 6 January 2013
- Predecessor: Francesco Alfano

Personal details
- Born: 29 November 1957 (age 68) Castelcivita, Salerno, Campania
- Denomination: Roman Catholic
- Motto: Latin: In silentio and in spe fortitudo vestra

Ordination history of Pasquale Cascio
History
Priestly ordination
- Place: Diocese of Teggiano-Policastro
Episcopal consecration
- Principal consecrator: Crescenzio Sepe
- Co-consecrators: Antonio Maria De Luca, Francesco Alfano
- Place: Materdomini, Caposele, Province of Avellino, Campania, Italy

Pasquale Cascio (born 29 November 1957) is an Italian ordinary of the Catholic Church. He currently serves as the Archbishop of Sant'Angelo dei Lombardi-Conza-Nusco-Bisaccia.

== Biography ==
Coat of arms of Pasquale Cascio

Pasquale Cascio was born on 29 November 1957 in Castelcivita, a comune in the Province of Salerno and the Italian region of Campania. He entered the Pius IX Seminary in Salerno and then attended the Almo Collegio Capranica in Rome. He subsequently studied philosophy and theology at the Pontifical Gregorian University. He then received a Licentiate of Sacred Scripture from the Pontifical Biblical Institute.

Cascio was ordained a priest on 23 July 1983 in the Diocese of Teggiano-Policastro. From 1984 to 2012, he served as a priest in the parish of St. John the Baptist in the hamlet of Terranova in Sicignano degli Alburni and from 1988 to 2007, he taught at the Higher Institute of Religious Sciences in Teggiano. At various points, Cascio additionally served as vicar for the Alburni area, professor of sacred scripture at the Theological Institute of Basilicata in Potenza, a teacher of sacred scripture at the John Paul II Metropolitan Seminary in Salerno and at the Higher Institute of Religious Sciences in Vallo della Lucania, a member of the diocesan presbyterial council and college of consultors, and the director of the diocesan technical office.

Cascio was appointed the Archbishop of Sant'Angelo dei Lombardi-Conza-Nusco-Bisaccia on 27 October 2012. On 5 January 2013, he was consecrated a bishop by Cardinal Crescenzio Sepe (Archbishop of Naples) and co-consecrators Antonio Maria De Luca (Bishop of Teggiano-Policastro) and Francesco Alfano (Archbishop of Sorrento-Castellammarre di Stabia) in the Sanctuary of San Gerardo Maiella in Materdomini, a hamlet of Caposele in the Province of Avellino and region of Campania. He officially took possession of the archdiocese of 6 January.

== See also ==
- Roman Catholic Archdiocese of Sant'Angelo dei Lombardi-Conza-Nusco-Bisaccia
- Catholic Church in Italy

Catholic Church titles
Preceded by Francesco Alfano	Archbishop of Sant'Angelo dei Lombardi-Conza-Nusco-Bisaccia; 2013-present	Incumbent
