= Aquino Cathedral =

Cathedral in Aquino, Lazio, Italy

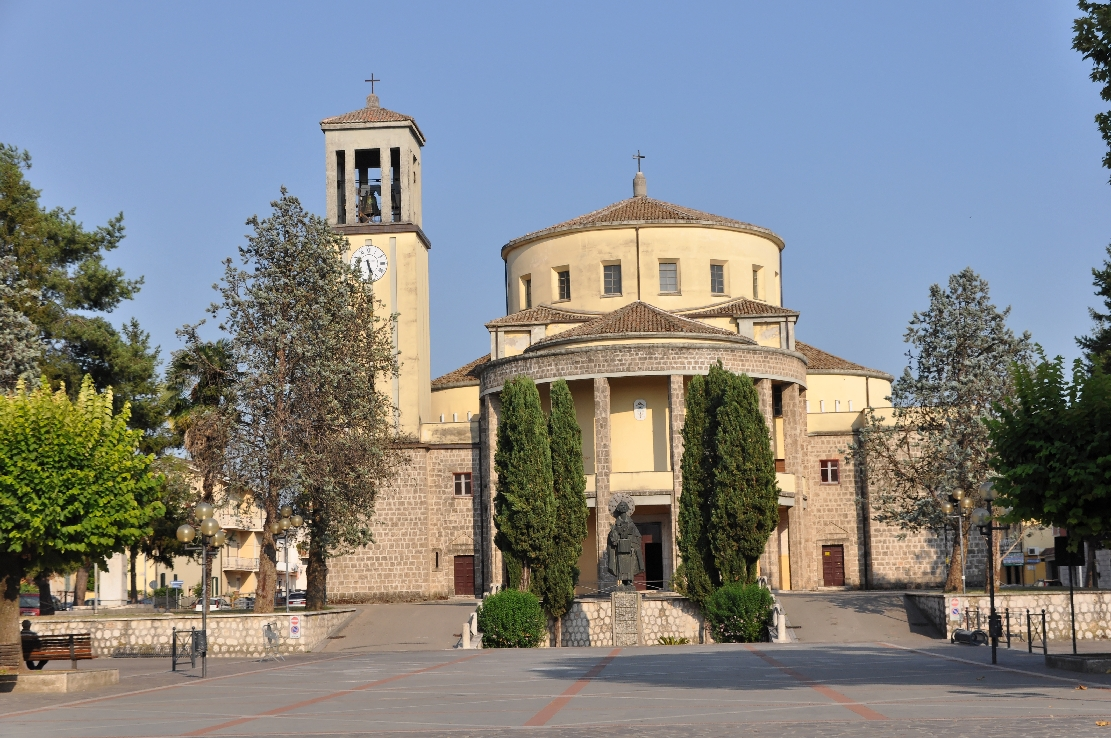
Aquino Cathedral

Aquino Cathedral (Italian: Concattedrale di Aquino; Cattedrale dei Santi Costanzo Vescovo e Tommaso d'Aquino) is a Roman Catholic cathedral in Aquino, Lazio, Italy. It is dedicated to Saints Constantius of Aquino and Thomas Aquinas.

It was formerly the episcopal seat of the Diocese of Aquino, from 1725 the Diocese of Aquino e Pontecorvo. It became a co-cathedral of the Diocese of Sora-Aquino-Pontecorvo at its formation in 1818. The diocese was renamed the Diocese of Sora-Cassino-Aquino-Pontecorvo in 2014 when it incorporated the Territorial Abbey of Montecassino.

== History ==
The first cathedral is believed to have been built in Aquino in 1094, as a donation made to the Monastery of Montecassino. It was dedicated to the Apostle Saint Peter, and named San Pietro Vetere. A second cathedral, dedicated to St Mary of the Angels, was also built in the location of today's archaeological site of Aquinum. Around the middle of the 13th century, San Pietro was replaced by the church of San Costanzo, dedicated to the patron saint of the city who was bishop of Aquino in the 6th century. At the beginning of the eighteenth century, the church of San Costanzo collapsed and was rebuilt in Baroque style by Bishop de Carolis and inaugurated in 1711.

In 1944, the city was subjected to bombings, which seriously and irreversibly damaged the cathedral of San Costanzo. At the end of the Second World War, a reconstruction was started on the opposite of the square where the cathedral is now located. The projects were carried out by architect Breccia-Fratadocchi, and the church was consecrated by the bishop of Aquino, Sora and Pontecorvo on 19 October 1963.

The cathedral is a modern and imposing church, with a Greek cross plan. In the apse, there is a large mosaic depicting the Resurrection of Jesus. The church has some relics of Saint Thomas, which were donated by the cathedral of Toulouse.

On 17 January 1974 Pope Paul VI elevated the cathedral of San Costanzo Vescovo and San Tommaso d'Aquino in Aquino to the dignity of a minor basilica, following a petition from Bishop Minchiatti promoted by Don Battista and addressed to Pope Montini.

The basilica coat of arms is composed of:

- A shield in the center of which the Sun of St. Thomas shines: The sun shining in the shield is the symbol of St. Thomas, Patron of the City of Aquino and of the Diocese of Aquino, Sora and Pontecorvo.
- The Papal Banner in the shape of an umbrella with red and yellow gussets, which has the appearance of a semi-closed parasol that in ancient times was opened to protect eminent personalities from the sun or rain. When decorated in red and gold, it was used in Roman basilicas to welcome the Pope who went there to visit. Its presence therefore alludes to the Basilical title of an ecclesial building and its link with the Successor of Peter.
- Two keys, which allude to the famous Gospel passage in which Jesus gives Peter the Keys to Heaven: "I will give you the keys of the kingdom of heaven; whatever you bind on earth will be bound in heaven, and whatever you loose on earth will be loosed in heaven.” (Mt 16,19).
- Text that reads: “IN SAPIENTIA MANET SICUT SOL”.
