= Illiano =

Illiano is an Italian surname. Notable people with the surname include:

- Frank Illiano (1928–2014), American mobster
- Gioacchino Illiano (1935–2020), Italian Roman Catholic bishop
- Raffaele Illiano (born 1977), Italian cyclist
