= Diocese of Campagna =

Former Latin Catholic diocese in Italy

The Diocese of Campagna was twice been a Latin Church suffragan diocese with its episcopal see in Campagna, a town in the Salerno province of Campania region, southern Italy.

Its former cathedral episcopal see is now a co-cathedral: the minor basilica of Santa Maria della Pace (dedicated to Our Lady of Peace).

== History ==
A first Diocese of Campagna was established on 19 July 1525, on territories split off from the Metropolitan Archdiocese of Salerno and the Diocese of Satriano, the bishop of that see cumulated as first Bishop of Campagna, and his successors continued to do so.

On 27 June 1818, it was suppressed and its territory (not the title) merged into the Diocese of Sant’Angelo dei Lombardi–Bisaccia.

On 30 September 1921, a (second) Diocese of Campagna was 'restored' on territory split off from the then Archdiocese of Conza, but administered by the same Conza 1818.06.27–1921.09.30 under that metropolitan as Apostolic Administrators until 1921.

On 30 September 1986, the diocese was suppressed and its territory (again not the title) merged into the Archdiocese of Sant'Angelo dei Lombardi-Conza-Nusco-Bisaccia, to which see the last bishop of Campagna was promoted.

== Episcopal ordinaries ==
Bishops of Campagna (first creation)
see the bishops of Satriano

Bishops of Campagna (restored period)

- Apostolic Administrator Michelangelo Lupoli (1818.05.25 – 1831.12.30), while Metropolitan Archbishop of nearby Conza (Italy) (1818.05.25 – 1831.12.30)
- Apostolic Administrator Gennaro Pellini (1831 – 1835.10.06), while Metropolitan Archbishop of Conza (Italy) (1836.02.01 – 1848.12.22)
- Apostolic Administrator Leone Ciampa, Discalced Franciscans (O.F.M. Disc.) (Apostolic Administrator 1836.02.01 – 1848.12.22), while Metropolitan Archbishop of Conza (Italy) (1836.02.01 – 1848.12.22), later Metropolitan Archbishop of Sorrento (Italy) (1848.12.22 – death 1854)
- Apostolic Administrator Giuseppe Pappalardo (Apostolic Administrator 1849 – death 1850), while Metropolitan Archbishop of Conza (Italy) (1849 – 1850)
- Apostolic Administrator Grigorio De Luca (Apostolic Administrator 1850.05.20 – death 1878), while Metropolitan Archbishop of Conza (Italy) (1850.05.20 – 1878)
- Apostolic Administrator Salvatore Nappi (Apostolic Administrator 1879.02.28 – death 1896.10.18), while Metropolitan Archbishop of Conza (Italy) (1879.02.28 – 1896.10.18)
- Apostolic Administrator Antonio Buglione (Apostolic Administrator 1896.10.18 – death 1904.02.20), while Metropolitan Archbishop of Conza (Italy) (1896.10.18 – 1904.02.20)
- Apostolic Administrator Nicola Piccirilli (Apostolic Administrator 1904.11.15 – 1917.09.25), while Metropolitan Archbishop of Conza (Italy) (1904.11.15 – 1917.09.25); later Metropolitan Archbishop of Lanciano (Italy) (1917.09.25 – 1939.03.04) and Apostolic Administrator of Ortona (Italy) (1917.09.25 – 1939.03.04)
- Apostolic Administrator Carmine Cesarano, Redemptorists (C.SS.R.) (Apostolic Administrator 1918.09.30 – 1921.09.30 see below), while first Bishop of Ozieri (Italy) (1915.04.18 – 1918.09.30), then Metropolitan Archbishop of Conza (Italy) (1918.09.30 – 1921.09.30)
- Archbishop-bishop Carmine Cesarano, C.SS.R. (see above 1921.09.30 – resigned 1931.12.16), later Archbishop-Bishop of Aversa (Italy) (1931.12.16 – death 1935.11.22)
- Pietro Capizzi (1932.09.16 – resigned 1937.08.12), later Bishop of Caltagirone (Italy) (1937.08.12 – 1960.11.11); emeritate as Titular Archbishop of Amorium (1960.11.11 – death 1961.07.07)
- Giiuseppe Maria Palatucci, Conventual Franciscans (O.F.M. Conv.) (1937.09.20 – death 1961.03.31)
- Jolando Nuzzi (1961.05.20 – 1971.01.04); previously Titular Bishop of Emmaus (1959.08.08 – 1961.05.20) & Auxiliary Bishop of Sabina e Poggio Mirteto (Italy) (1959.08.08 – 1961.05.20); later Bishop of Nocera de’ Pagani (Italy) (1971.01.04 – 1986.09.30), Bishop of Cava de’ Tirreni (Italy) (1972.09.25 – 1986.09.30), Bishop of Sarno (Italy) (1972.09.25 – 1986.09.30), again Bishop of above Nocera Inferiore–Sarno (1986.09.30 – death 1986.12.27)
- Gaetano Pollio (陽霖), Pontifical Institute for Foreign Missions (P.I.M.E.) (1973.08.04 – retired 1984.10.20); previously Metropolitan Archbishop of Kaifeng 開封 (China) (1946.12.12 – 1960.09.08), Metropolitan Archbishop of Roman Catholic Archdiocese of Otranto (Italy) (1960.09.08 – 1969.02.05), Apostolic Administrator of Ugento–Santa Maria di Leuca (Italy) (1968 – 1969), Metropolitan Archbishop of Salerno (Italy) (1969.02.05 – retired 1984.10.20), Apostolic Administrator of Acerno (Italy) (1969.02.05 – retired 1984.10.20)
- Apostolic Administrator José d’Angelo Neto (1982 – 1984), while Metropolitan Archbishop of Pouso Alegre (Brazil) (1962.04.14 – death 1990.05.31)
- Guerino Grimaldi (1984.10.20 – 1986.09.30); previously Titular Bishop of Salpi (1968.02.02 – 1971.03.19), Auxiliary Bishop of Salerno (Italy) (1968.02.02 – 1971.03.19), Bishop of Nola (Italy) (1971.03.19 – 1982.07.02), Coadjutor Archbishop of Salerno (1982.07.02 – 1984.10.20), Coadjutor Bishop of Campagna (Italy) (1982.07.02 – 1984.10.20, succeeding thus); also Apostolic Administrator of Acerno (Italy) (1984.10.20 – 1986.09.30), later first Metropolitan Archbishop of Salerno–Campagna–Acerno (Italy) (1986.09.30 – 1992.04.12)

== See also ==
- Diocese of Satriano e Campagna
- Catholic Church in Italy
