= Francesco Alfano =

Italian Catholic archbishop

His Excellency, The Most Reverend Francesco Alfano
- Archbishop of Sorrento-Castellammare di Stabia
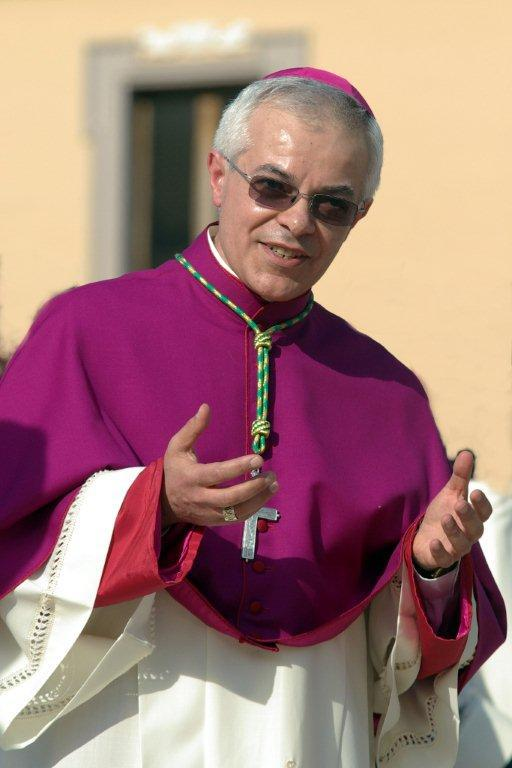
- Archdiocese: Sorrento-Castellammare di Stabia
- Appointed: 10 March 2012
- Installed: 28 April 2012
- Predecessor: Felice Cece
- Previous post: Archbishop of Sant'Angelo dei Lombardi-Conza-Nusco-Bisaccia (2005–2012)

Orders
- Ordination: 17 November 1982
- Consecration: 2 July 2005 by Gioacchino Illiano

Personal details
- Born: 13 June 1956 (age 69) Nocera Inferiore, Campania, Italy
- Denomination: Roman Catholic
- Coat of arms

Francesco Alfano (born 13 June 1956) is an Italian Catholic archbishop. He is currently the Archbishop of Sorrento-Castellammare di Stabia and previously served as Archbishop of Sant'Angelo dei Lombardi-Conza-Nusco-Bisaccia.

== Biography ==
Francesco Alfano was born on 13 June 1956 in the comune of Nocera Inferiore in Campania, Italy.

He attended the minor diocesan seminary in Salerno. As a student at the Almo Collegio Capranica, he studied philosophy and theology at the Pontifical Gregorian University, receiving a licentiate in dogmatic theology. He was then ordained a priest on 17 November 1982 in the Diocese of Nocera Inferiore-Sarno.

Over the course of his priesthood, Alfano has held the position of assistant vicar of San Bartolomeo Apostolo in Nocera Inferiore from 1982 to 1986, parish priest at Santa Maria delle Grazie in the hamlet of Casali in Roccapiemonte from 1986 to 1989, parish priest at Santa Maria delle Grazie in Angri from 1989, director of the Diocesan Institute of Religious Services from 1992 to 1996, and was responsible for training seminarians from 1993 to 2002. In 2001, he became episcopal vicar for the clergy in the diocese, and was the diocesan assistant to the youth of Azione Cattolica. He was also the secretary of the presbyteral council of the college of consultors, was director of the pastoral council, and was responsible for the pastoral office of the new evangelization.

Alfano worked on the celebration of diocesan synod from 1996 to 2001 and on the first diocesan eucharistic congress.

On 24 October 1996, he was appointed a Chaplain of His Holiness, taking the honorific title of monsignor.

=== Episcopal ministry ===
On 14 May 2005, Alfano was appointed Archbishop of Sant'Angelo dei Lombardi-Conza-Nusco-Bisaccia. He was consecrated a bishop on 2 July 2005 by Bishop Gioacchino Illiano and co-consecrators Archbishop Paolo Romeo and Archbishop Salvatore Nunnari.

On 10 March 2012, he was appointed Archbishop of Sorrento-Castellammare di Stabia, but continued to serve as apostolic administrator of the Archdiocese of Sant'Angelo dei Lombardi-Conza-Nusco-Bisaccia until 6 January 2013. He took possession of his new diocese on 28 April 2012.

As Archbishop of Sorrento-Castellammare di Stabia, he resides in the archiepiscopal seminary "Alfonso Sozy Carafa" in Vico Equense.

Catholic Church titles
Preceded by Salvatore Nunnari	Archbishop of Sant'Angelo dei Lombardi-Conza-Nusco-Bisaccia; 2005–2012	Succeeded by Pasquale Cascio
Preceded by Felice Cece	Archbishop of Sorrento-Castellammare di Stabia; 2012–present	Incumbent
