= Flaminio Filonardi =

Italian Roman Catholic prelate

Most Reverend Flaminio Filonardi
- Bishop of Aquino
- Church: Catholic Church
- Diocese: Diocese of Aquino
- In office: 1579–1608
- Predecessor: Giovanni Luigi Guarini
- Successor: Filippo Filonardi

Orders
- Consecration: 8 December 1579 by Giulio Antonio Santorio

Personal details
- Died: 12 September 1608 Aquino, Italy

Flaminio Filonardi (died 12 September 1608) was a Roman Catholic prelate who served as Bishop of Aquino (1579–1608).

== Biography ==
On 13 November 1579, Flaminio Filonardi was appointed during the papacy of Pope Gregory XIII as Bishop of Aquino. On 8 December 1579, he was consecrated bishop by Giulio Antonio Santorio, Cardinal-Priest of San Bartolomeo all'Isola, with Fabio Mirto Frangipani, Titular Archbishop of Nazareth, Massimiliano Palumbara, Archbishop of Benevento, and Giovanni Battista Santorio, Bishop of Alife, serving as co-consecrators. He served as Bishop of Aquino until his death on 12 September 1608.

== Episcopal succession ==
While bishop, he was the principal co-consecrator of:

- Scipione Gesualdo, Archbishop of Conza (1585);
- Scipione Spina, Bishop of Lecce (1591);
- Napoleone Comitoli, Bishop of Perugia (1591);
- Claudio de Curtis, Bishop of Crotone (1592);
- Nicolò Stizzia, Bishop of Cefalù (1594);
- Georgius Perpignani, Bishop of Tinos (1594);
- Placido della Marra, Bishop of Melfi e Rapolla (1595);
- Giulio Doffius, Bishop of Alessano (1595); and
- Virgilio Fiorenzi, Bishop of Nocera Umbra (1605).

== External links and additional sources ==
- Cheney, David M. "Diocese of Aquino e Pontecorvo". Catholic-Hierarchy.org. (for Chronology of Bishops) ^{[self-published]}
- Chow, Gabriel. "Diocese of Aquino (Italy)". GCatholic.org. (for Chronology of Bishops) ^{[self-published]}

Catholic Church titles
| Preceded by Giovanni Luigi Guarini | Bishop of Aquino; 1579–1608 | Succeeded by Filippo Filonardi |
