= Domizio Falangola =

Roman Catholic bishop (died 1470)

Most Reverend Domizio Falangola
- Archbishop of Sorrento
- Church: Catholic Church
- Archdiocese: Archdiocese of Sorrento
- In office: 1442–1470
- Predecessor: Antonio Bretone
- Successor: Scipione Cicinelli

Personal details
- Died: 8 January 1470 Sorrento, Italy

Domizio Falangola (died 1470) was a Roman Catholic prelate who served as Archbishop of Sorrento (1442–1470).

== Biography ==
On 17 Oct 1442, Domizio Falangola was appointed during the papacy of Pope Eugene IV as Archbishop of Sorrento. He served as Archbishop of Sorrento until his death on 8 Jan 1470.

== External links and additional sources ==
- Cheney, David M. "Archdiocese of Sorrento–Castellammare di Stabia". Catholic-Hierarchy.org. (for Chronology of Bishops) ^{[self-published]}
- Chow, Gabriel. "Archdiocese of Sorrento–Castellammare di Stabia (Italy)". GCatholic.org. (for Chronology of Bishops) ^{[self-published]}

Catholic Church titles
Preceded by Antonio Bretone	Archbishop of Sorrento; 1442–1470	Succeeded by Scipione Cicinelli
