= Marco Saracini =

Italian Roman Catholic prelate

Most Reverend Marco Saracini
- Bishop of Volterra
- Church: Catholic Church
- Diocese: Diocese of Volterra
- In office: 1574
- Predecessor: Ludovico Antinori
- Successor: Guido Serguidi

Orders
- Consecration: 24 Jan 1574 by Felice Peretti Montalto

Personal details
- Born: July 1535 Arezzo, Italy
- Died: 21 September 1574 (age 39) Volterra, Italy

Marco Saracini (1535–1574) was a Roman Catholic prelate who served as Bishop of Volterra (1574).

== Biography ==
Marco Saracini was born in July 1535 in Arezzo, Italy. On 15 January 1574, he was appointed during the papacy of Pope Gregory XIII as Bishop of Volterra. On 24 Jan 1574, he was consecrated bishop by Felice Peretti Montalto, Bishop of Fermo, with Giacomo Lomellino del Canto, Archbishop of Palermo, and Adriano Fuscone, Bishop of Aquino, serving as co-consecrators. He served as Bishop of Volterra until his death on 21 September 1574 in Volterra, Italy.

Catholic Church titles
| Preceded by Ludovico Antinori | Bishop of Volterra; 1574 | Succeeded by Guido Serguidi |
