= Pompeio Arrigoni =

17th-century Catholic cardinal

His Eminence Pompeio Arrigoni
- Cardinal-Priest of Santa Balbina; Archbishop of Benevento
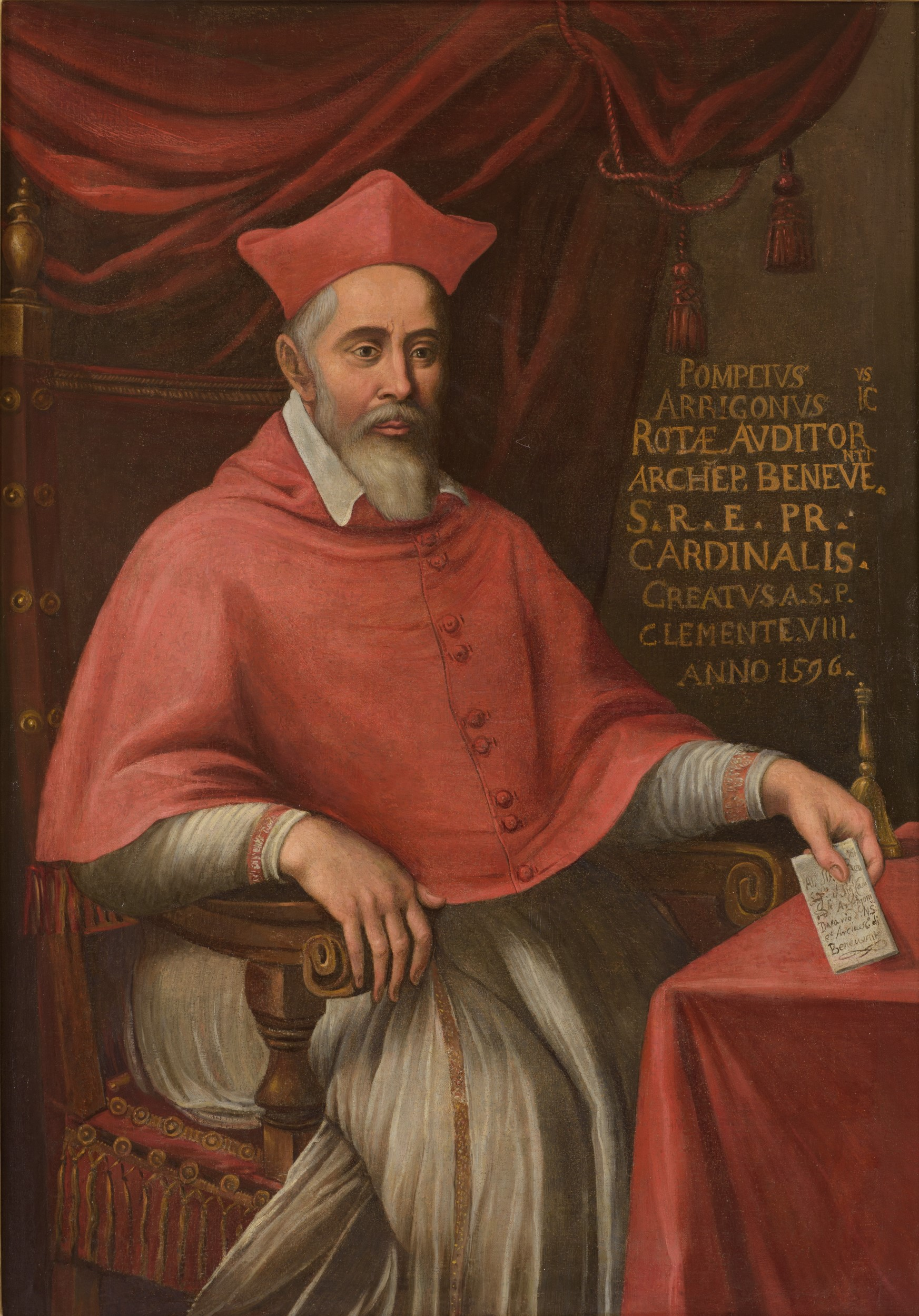
- Church: Catholic Church

Orders
- Consecration: 24 Feb 1607 by Pope Paul V

Personal details
- Born: 1552 Rome, Italy
- Died: 4 Apr 1616 (age 64)

Pompeio Arrigoni or Pompeo Arrigoni (1552–1616) was a Roman Catholic cardinal.

== Biography ==
On 24 Feb 1607, he was consecrated bishop by Pope Paul V, with Ludovico de Torres, Archbishop of Monreale, and Marcello Lante della Rovere, Bishop of Todi, serving as co-consecrators.

While bishop, he was the principal consecrator of Bartolomeo Giorgi, Bishop of Pesaro (1609); and Pietro Federici, Bishop of Vulturara e Montecorvino (1609).

Catholic Church titles
Preceded by Antonmaria Salviati	Cardinal-Deacon of Santa Maria in Aquiro; 1596–1597	Succeeded by Lorenzo Magalotti
Preceded by Gaspar de Quiroga y Vela	Cardinal-Priest of Santa Balbina; 1597–1616	Succeeded by Antonio Zapata y Cisneros
Preceded by Massimiliano Palumbara	Archbishop of Benevento; 1607–1616	Succeeded by Alessandro di Sangro
