= Gregorio Coppino =

17th-century Roman Catholic bishop

Most Reverend Gregorio Coppino
- Bishop of Sant'Angelo dei Lombardi e Bisaccia
- Church: Catholic Church
- Diocese: Diocese of Sant'Angelo dei Lombardi e Bisaccia
- In office: 1645
- Predecessor: Ercole Rangoni
- Successor: Alessandro Salzilla

Orders
- Consecration: 18 Jun 1645 by Giovanni Giacomo Panciroli

Personal details
- Born: 1595 Parma, Italy
- Died: Oct 1645 (age 50)

Gregorio Coppino, O.S.B. (1595–1645) was a Roman Catholic prelate who served as Bishop of Sant'Angelo dei Lombardi e Bisaccia (1645).

== Biography ==
Gregorio Coppino was born in 1595 in Parma, Italy and ordained a priest in the Order of Saint Benedict. On 12 Jun 1645, he was appointed during the papacy of Pope Innocent X as Bishop of Sant'Angelo dei Lombardi e Bisaccia. On 18 Jun 1645, he was consecrated bishop by Giovanni Giacomo Panciroli, Cardinal-Priest of Santo Stefano al Monte Celio, with Alessandro Castracani, Bishop of Fano, and Ippolito Franconi, Bishop of Nocera de' Pagani, serving as co-consecrators. His term as Bishop of Sant'Angelo dei Lombardi e Bisaccia was short as he died in Oct 1645.

== External links and additional sources ==
- Cheney, David M. "Diocese of Sant'Angelo dei Lombardi e Bisaccia". Catholic-Hierarchy.org. (for Chronology of Bishops) ^{[self-published]}
- Chow, Gabriel. "Archdiocese of Sant'Angelo dei Lombardi–Conza–Nusco–Bisaccia". GCatholic.org. (for Chronology of Bishops) ^{[self-published]}

Catholic Church titles
Preceded by Ercole Rangoni	Bishop of Sant'Angelo dei Lombardi e Bisaccia; 1645	Succeeded by Alessandro Salzilla
