= Fabio Lagonissa =

Italian patriarch

- Archbishop of Conza
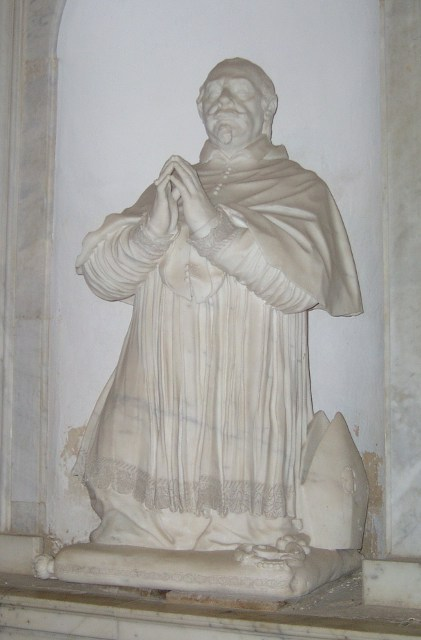
- Funeral monument
- Church: Catholic Church
- Archdiocese: Conza
- See: Santa Maria Assunta
- In office: 1622–1645
- Predecessor: Curzio Cocci
- Successor: Ercole Rangoni
- Other posts: Inquisitor of Malta (1614–1619), Papal nuncio to Flanders (1627–1634)

Orders
- Consecration: 21 February 1622

Personal details
- Born: 1584/85 Naples, Kingdom of Naples
- Died: 1659 Naples, Kingdom of Naples

Fabio Lagonissa (1584/85–1659) was an Italian bishop and papal diplomat.

== Life ==
Lagonissa was born in Naples in 1584, or possibly 1585, a son of Giovanni Battista Lagonissa and Feliciana Caracciolo. After studying civil and canon law at the University of Naples he went to Rome and was appointed a referendary of the Apostolic Signatura. From 1614 to 1619 he was inquisitor of Malta and consultor to the Holy Office. On 21 February 1622 he was consecrated archbishop of Conza, but remained active in the papal curia. He accompanied Francesco Barberini on his unsuccessful mission to Spain in 1625–26.

In March 1627 he was appointed papal nuncio to the Southern Netherlands. After the Infanta Isabella's death in 1633 the nunciature fell into abeyance, and in January 1634 Lagonissa returned to Rome.

In 1645 he resigned as archbishop of Conza. He died in Naples in February 1659.

Catholic Church titles
Preceded by Evangelista Carbonese	Inquisitor of Malta; 1614–1619	Succeeded by Antonio Tornielli
Preceded by Curzio Cocci	Archbishop of Conza; 1622–1645	Succeeded by Ercole Rangoni
Preceded by Giovanni Francesco Guidi di Bagno	Papal nuncio to Flanders; 1627–1634	Succeeded by Lelio Falconieri
