= Nardo Mormile =

Archbishop of Sorrento (1480-1493)

Most Reverend Nardo Mormile
- Archbishop of Sorrento
- Church: Catholic Church
- Archdiocese: Archdiocese of Sorrento
- In office: 1480–1493
- Predecessor: Giacomo de Sanctis
- Successor: Menelao Gennari

Personal details
- Died: 1493 Sorrento, Italy

Nardo Mormile (died 1493) was a Roman Catholic prelate who served as Archbishop of Sorrento (1480–1493).

== Biography ==
On 12 May 1480, Nardo Mormile was appointed during the papacy of Pope Sixtus IV as Archbishop of Sorrento. He served as Archbishop of Sorrento until his death in 1493.

== External links and additional sources ==
Catholic Church titles
Preceded by Giacomo de Sanctis	Archbishop of Sorrento; 1480–1493	Succeeded by Menelao Gennari
