= Ercole Rangoni (archbishop of Conza) =

Roman Catholic archbishop

Most Reverend Ercole Rangoni
- Archbishop of Conza
- Church: Catholic Church
- Archdiocese: Archdiocese of Conza
- In office: 1645–1650
- Predecessor: Fabio Lagonissa
- Successor: Fabrizio Campana
- Previous post: Bishop of Sant'Angelo dei Lombardi e Bisaccia (1622–1645)

Orders
- Consecration: 17 May 1622 by Maffeo Barberini

Personal details
- Died: 13 February 1650

Ercole Rangoni (died 13 February 1650) was a Roman Catholic prelate who served as Archbishop of Conza (1645–1650) and Bishop of Sant'Angelo dei Lombardi e Bisaccia (1622–1645).

== Biography ==
On 2 May 1622, Ercole Rangoni was appointed during the papacy of Pope Gregory XV as Bishop of Sant'Angelo dei Lombardi e Bisaccia. On 17 May 1622, he was consecrated bishop by Maffeo Barberini, Cardinal-Priest of Sant'Onofrio, with Cosimo de' Bardi, Bishop of Carpentras, and Aloysius Galli, Bishop of Ancona e Numana, serving as co-consecrators. On 24 April 1645, he was appointed during the papacy of Pope Innocent X as Archbishop of Conza. He served as Archbishop of Conza until his death on 13 February 1650.

== See also ==
- Catholic Church in Italy

== External links and additional sources ==
- Cheney, David M. "Diocese of Sant'Angelo dei Lombardi e Bisaccia". Catholic-Hierarchy.org. (for Chronology of Bishops) ^{[self-published]}
- Chow, Gabriel. "Archdiocese of Sant'Angelo dei Lombardi–Conza–Nusco–Bisaccia". GCatholic.org. (for Chronology of Bishops) ^{[self-published]}

Catholic Church titles
Preceded by Francesco Diotallevi	Bishop of Sant'Angelo dei Lombardi e Bisaccia; 1622–1645	Succeeded by Gregorio Coppino
Preceded by Fabio Lagonissa	Archbishop of Conza; 1645–1650	Succeeded by Fabrizio Campana
