= Giacomo de Sanctis =

Most Reverend Giacomo de Sanctis
- Archbishop of Sorrento
- Church: Catholic Church
- Archdiocese: Archdiocese of Sorrento
- In office: 1474–1479
- Predecessor: Scipione Cicinelli
- Successor: Nardo Mormile

Personal details
- Died: Aug 1479 Sorrento, Italy

Giacomo de Sanctis (died 1479) was a Roman Catholic prelate who served as Archbishop of Sorrento (1474–1479).

== Biography ==
On 22 Jun 1474, Giacomo de Sanctis was appointed during the papacy of Pope Sixtus IV as Archbishop of Sorrento. He served as Archbishop of Sorrento until his death in Aug 1479.

== External links and additional sources ==
- Cheney, David M. "Archdiocese of Sorrento–Castellammare di Stabia". Catholic-Hierarchy.org. (for Chronology of Bishops) ^{[self-published]}
- Chow, Gabriel. "Archdiocese of Sorrento–Castellammare di Stabia (Italy)". GCatholic.org. (for Chronology of Bishops) ^{[self-published]}

Catholic Church titles
Preceded by Scipione Cicinelli	Archbishop of Sorrento; 1474–1479	Succeeded by Nardo Mormile
