= Bartolomeo Cesi (cardinal) =

Roman Catholic cardinal

His Eminence Bartolomeo Cesi
- Cardinal-Priest of San Lorenzo in Lucina; Bishop of Tivoli
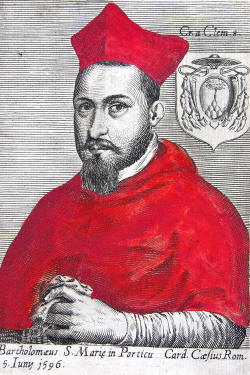
- Church: Catholic Church

Orders
- Consecration: 18 Sep 1605 by Bonifazio Caetani

Personal details
- Born: 1566 Rome, Italy
- Died: 18 Oct 1621 (age 55)

Bartolomeo Cesi (1566–1621) was a Roman Catholic cardinal.

== Biography ==
Belonging to the powerful Cesi family, on 18 Sep 1605, he was consecrated bishop by Bonifazio Caetani, Bishop of Cassano all'Jonio, with Pietro Francesco Montorio, Bishop of Nicastro, and Placido della Marra, Bishop of Melfi e Rapolla, serving as co-consecrator.

Catholic Church titles
Preceded by Hughes de Loubenx de Verdalle	Cardinal-Deacon of Santa Maria in Portico; 1596–1611	Succeeded by Ferdinando Gonzaga (cardinal)
Preceded by Scipione Gesualdo	Archbishop of Conza; 1608–1614	Succeeded by Curzio Cocci
Preceded by Lanfranco Margotti	Cardinal-Priest of San Pietro in Vincoli; 1611–1613	Succeeded by Bonifazio Bevilacqua Aldobrandini
Preceded by Ottavio Acquaviva d'Aragona (seniore)	Cardinal-Priest of Santa Prassede; 1613–1620	Succeeded by Roberto Francesco Romolo Bellarmino
Preceded by Pietro Aldobrandini	Cardinal-Priest of Santa Maria in Trastevere; 1620–1621	Succeeded by Bonifazio Bevilacqua Aldobrandini
Preceded by Ottavio Bandini	Cardinal-Priest of San Lorenzo in Lucina; 1621	Succeeded by Andrea Baroni Peretti Montalto
Preceded by Giovanni Battista Toschi	Bishop of Tivoli; 1621	Succeeded by Marco Antonio Gozzadini
