= Scipione Gesualdo =

Roman Catholic Archbishop

Most Reverend Scipione Gesualdo
- Archbishop of Conza
- Church: Catholic Church
- Diocese: Archbishop of Conza
- In office: 1584–1608
- Predecessor: Marcantonio Pescara
- Successor: Bartolomeo Cesi (cardinal)

Orders
- Consecration: 13 Jan 1585 by Giulio Antonio Santorio

Personal details
- Died: 1608 Conza, Italy

Scipione Gesualdo (died 1608) was a Roman Catholic prelate who served as Archbishop of Conza (1584–1608).

== Biography ==
On 28 Nov 1584, Scipione Gesualdo was appointed during the papacy of Pope Gregory XIII as Archbishop of Conza. On 13 Jan 1585, he was consecrated bishop by Giulio Antonio Santorio, Cardinal-Priest of San Bartolomeo all'Isola, Massimiliano Palumbara, Archbishop of Benevento, and Flaminio Filonardi, Bishop of Aquino, serving as co-consecrators. He served as Archbishop of Conza until his death in 1608.

Catholic Church titles
Preceded by Marcantonio Pescara	Archbishop of Conza; 1584–1608	Succeeded by Bartolomeo Cesi (cardinal)
