= Curzio Cocci =

Roman Catholic archbishop

Most Reverend Curzio Cocci
- Archbishop of Conza
- Church: Catholic Church
- Archdiocese: Archdiocese of Conza
- In office: 1614–1621
- Predecessor: Bartolomeo Cesi (cardinal)
- Successor: Fabio Lagonissa

Orders
- Consecration: 9 March 1614 by Giovanni Garzia Mellini

Personal details
- Died: November 1621 Conza, Italy

Curzio Cocci (died 1621) was a Roman Catholic prelate who served as Archbishop of Conza (1614–1621).

== Biography ==
On 3 March 1614, Curzio Cocci was appointed during the papacy of Pope Paul V as Archbishop of Conza. On 9 March 1614, he was consecrated bishop by Giovanni Garzia Mellini, Cardinal-Priest of Santi Quattro Coronati with Ulpiano Volpi, Archbishop of Chieti, and Tommaso Confetti, Bishop of Muro Lucano, serving as co-consecrators. He served as Archbishop of Conza until his death in November 1621.

Catholic Church titles
Preceded by Bartolomeo Cesi (cardinal)	Archbishop of Conza; 1614–1621	Succeeded by Fabio Lagonissa
