= Giovanni Andrea Croce =

16th-century Roman Catholic bishop

Most Reverend Giovanni Andrea Croce
- Bishop of Tivoli
- Church: Catholic Church
- Diocese: Diocese of Tivoli
- In office: 1554–1595
- Predecessor: Marcantonio della Croce
- Successor: Domenico Toschi

Giovanni Andrea Croce (died 1595) was a Roman Catholic prelate who served as Bishop of Tivoli (1554–1595).

On 26 January 1554, Giovanni Andrea Croce was appointed during the papacy of Pope Julius III as Bishop of Tivoli. He served as Bishop of Tivoli until his death on 2 Feb 1595.

While bishop, he was the principal co-consecrator of: Adriano Fuscone, Bishop of Aquino (1554); Gerolamo Melchiori, Bishop of Macerata (1554); and Massimiliano Palumbara, Archbishop of Benevento (1574).

== External links and additional sources ==
- Cheney, David M. "Diocese of Tivoli". Catholic-Hierarchy.org. (for Chronology of Bishops) ^{[self-published]}
- Chow, Gabriel. "Diocese of Tivoli (Italy)". GCatholic.org. (for Chronology of Bishops) ^{[self-published]}

Catholic Church titles
Preceded by Marcantonio della Croce	Bishop of Tivoli; 1554–1595	Succeeded by Domenico Toschi
