= Felice Cece =

Italian archbishop (1936–2020)

- Archbishop of Sorrento-Castellammare di Stabia
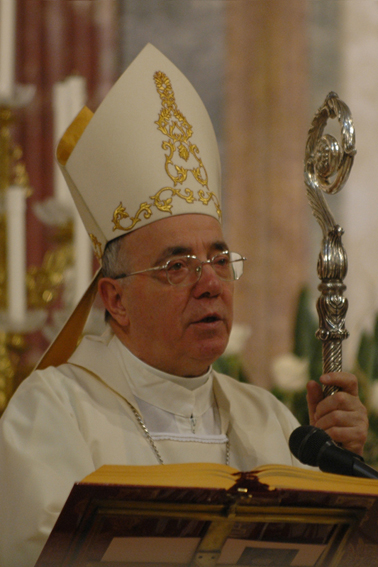
- Cece in 2012
- Church: Roman Catholic Church
- Archdiocese: Roman Catholic Archdiocese of Sorrento-Castellammare di Stabia
- In office: 1989–2012
- Predecessor: Antonio Zama
- Successor: Francesco Alfano
- Previous post: Bishop of Teano-Calvi (1984–1989)

Orders
- Ordination: 5 July 1959
- Consecration: 20 October 1984 by Bernardin Gantin
- Rank: Archbishop

Personal details
- Born: 26 March 1936 Cimitile, Italy
- Died: 12 May 2020 (aged 84)

Felice Cece (26 March 1936 – 12 May 2020) was an Italian Roman Catholic archbishop.

Cece was born in Italy and was ordained to the priesthood in 1959. He served as bishop of the Roman Catholic Diocese of Teano-Calvi, Italy, from 1984 to 1989 and as archbishop of the Roman Catholic Archdiocese of Sorrento-Castellammare di Stabia, Italy, from 1989 to 2010.
