= Archdiocese of Sant'Angelo dei Lombardi–Conza–Nusco–Bisaccia =

Latin Catholic archdiocese in Italy

Coordinates: 40.9333°N 15.1833°E

Archdiocese of Sant’Angelo dei Lombardi–Conza–Nusco–Bisaccia Archidioecesis Sancti Angeli de Lombardis–Compsana–Nuscana–Bisaciensis

Catholic
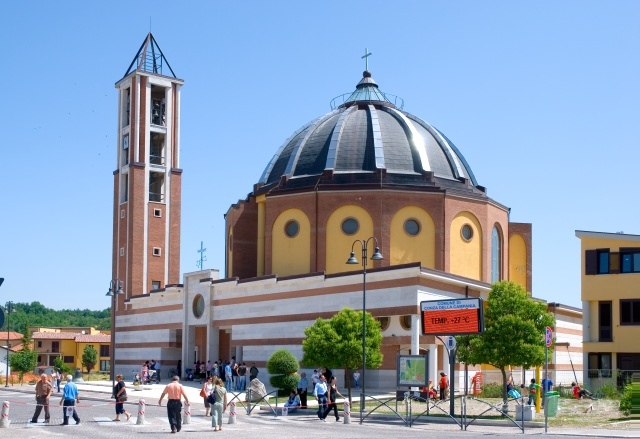
- Cathedral in Conza della Campania

Location
- Country: Italy
- Ecclesiastical province: Benevento

Statistics
- Area: 1,290 km^{2} (500 sq mi)
- Population: Total; Catholics: (as of 2020); 78,000 (est.); 77,050 (guess)
- Parishes: 36

Information
- Denomination: Catholic Church
- Rite: Roman Rite
- Established: 8th Century
- Cathedral: Cattedrale di S. Michele Arcangelo (Sant’Angelo dei Lombardi)
- Co-cathedral: Concattedrale della Natività della Vergine Maria (Bisaccia); Concattedrale di S. Maria Assunta (Conza di Campania); Concattedrale di S. Stefano (Nusco)
- Secular priests: 31 (diocesan 23 (Religious Orders); 4 Permanent Deacons

Current leadership
- Pope: Leo XIV
- Archbishop: Pasquale Cascio

Website
- www.diocesisantangelo.it

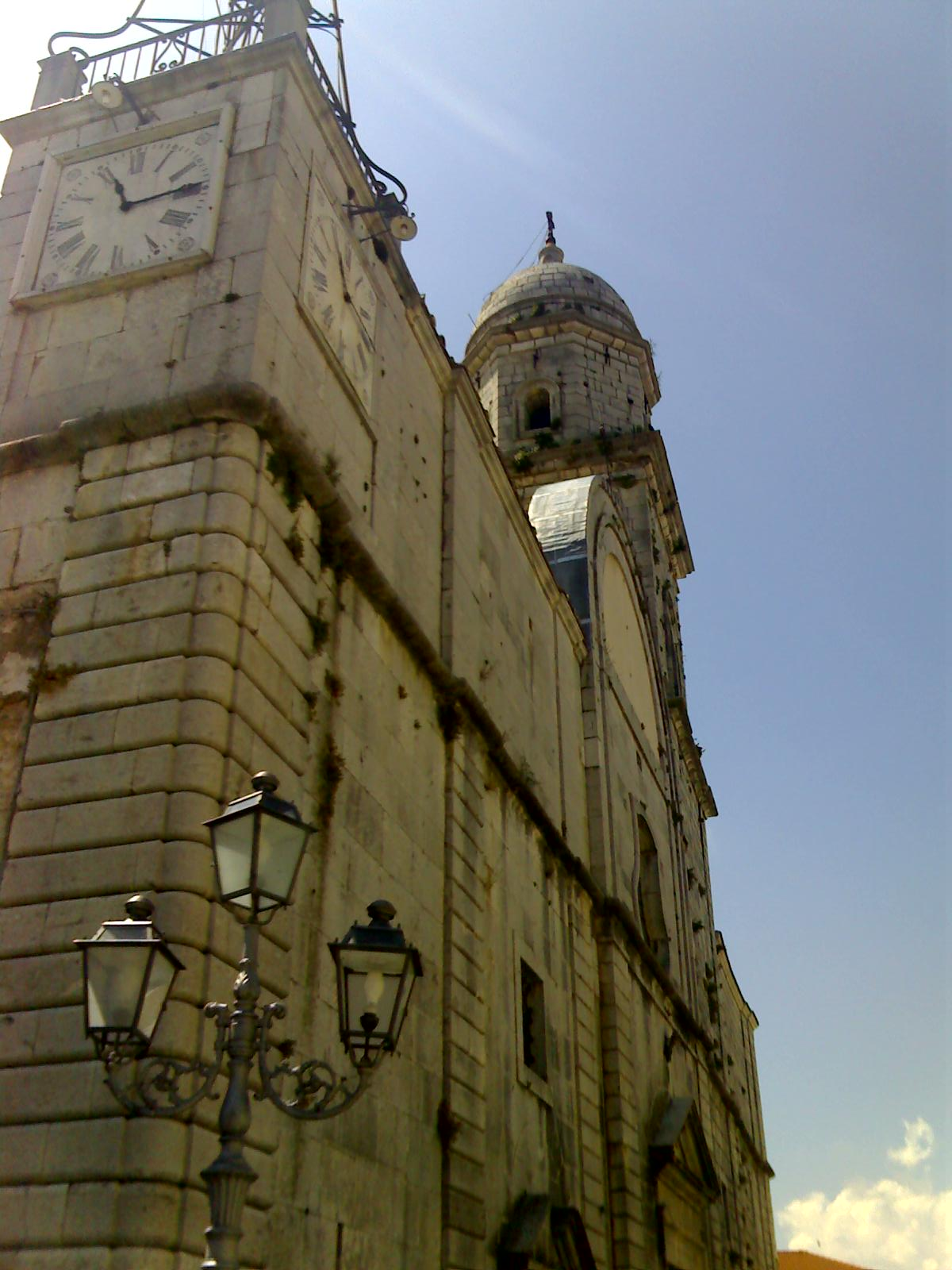
Co-cathedral in Nusco

The Archdiocese of Sant’Angelo dei Lombardi–Conza–Nusco–Bisaccia (Latin: Archidioecesis Sancti Angeli de Lombardis–Compsana–Nuscana–Bisaciensis) is an archdiocese of the Latin Church in Campania. It has existed since 1986. It is a suffragan of the archdiocese of Benevento.

== Organizational changes ==
The archdiocese of Conza existed from the eighth century to 1986. From 1818 to 1921, it was the archdiocese of Conza e Campagna, and then, from 1921 to 1986, the archdiocese of Conza-Sant'Angelo dei Lombardi-Bisaccia. After 1986, it became part of the archdiocese of Sant’Angelo dei Lombardi–Conza–Nusco–Bisaccia. The current archdiocese, therefore, has incorporated, with Conza, the diocese of Sant'Angelo dei Lombardi-Bisaccia and the diocese of Nusco.

== History ==
Conza, a city of the province of Avellino, Southern Italy, was twice destroyed by earthquakes (980, 1694), and was at one time nearly abandoned. The first known Bishop of Conza is Lando, who was present at the Roman synod of 743 held under Pope Zachary. In 989, the diocese of Conza was a suffragan (subordinate) of the archbishops of Salerno.

In 990, a very strong earthquake struck the area of Benevento. In Conza half the town was destroyed, and, according to the "Chronicon Cassinense", the bishop was killed in the disaster.

=== The archbishopric ===
On 22 July 1051, Pope Leo IX, who was visiting the monastery of Montecassino, confirmed the rights, privileges, and possessions of the Church of Salerno. These included the right of consecrating the bishops of Conza. Decisions by Pope Alexander II (1061–1073) and by Pope Gregory VII (1073–1085) also confirmed the subordinate status of the bishops of Conza to the archbishops of Salerno. The bishops resided either in their feudal stronghold of Santomenna or at Campagna.

On 20 July 1088, at the request of Roger Borsa, Duke of Apulia and Calabria, Pope Urban II again confirmed the rights and privileges of the archbishops of Salerno. He again stated that the diocese of Conza was a suffragan of the metropolitan of Salerno. He remarks, however, that the bishops of Acerenza and Conza have taken to calling themselves metropolitan archbishops, though he does not know why. He allows them to keep the title and he will grant pallia, but they are both still subordinate to the metropolitan of Salerno, and both the archbishop of Salerno and the papal legate must participate in the selection of an archbishop of Acerenza and of Conza.

The suffragan dioceses of the archdiocese of Conza, at the end of the 12th century, were: Muro Lucano, Satriano, Monteverde, Lacedonia, S. Angelo de' Lombardi, and Bisaccia.

=== Frederick II ===
The Emperor Frederick II was not an attentive monarch when it came to the appointment of bishops in his realms, particularly in southern Italy. On 25 September 1225, Pope Honorius III wrote him a particularly tart letter, announcing that he had taken action to fill episcopal posts which had long been vacant. These were Capua, Salerno, Brindisi, Conza, and Aversa. For Conza, he appointed the Prior of the monastery of S. Maria de Urbe, Andreas. The bearer of the letter was the new archbishop of Salerno, whom the pope expected Frederick to receive courteously (exhibitorem praesentium vultu sereno recipiat).

=== The Sede vacante of 1268 to 1274 ===
The previous archbishop of Conza had died in 1268, some time before the death of Pope Clement IV, on 29 November 1268. The meeting of the canons of the cathedral Chapter to elect a successor produced a double election, of Andrea de Albeto and of the priest Roger of Eliseum. Appeal was taken to Pope Clement IV, who assigned Cardinal Giovanni Gaetano Orsini, Cardinal Deacon of S. Niccolo in Carcere, to examine the case as papal Auditor. Hearings were held, and oaths were taken, but the case was not decided. The death of the pope brought on the longest vacancy in papal history, during which no legal rulings could be issued and no bishops appointed or approved.

Clement's successor, Pope Gregory X (Tedaldo Visconti), accepted the papal office in early February 1272, and reassigned the case to Cardinal Orsini. He then set out for Lyon, to preside at an ecumenical council, which was to open on 1 May 1274. But the pope subsequently decided, on 18 August 1274, to hand over the case to the Archbishop of Capua to rehear and issue a decision, and, with papal authority, to carry out the consecration of an archbishop for Conza.

In 1672, the city of Conza had a population estimated at 350 persons; in 1759, the population was estimated at 600 persons. The great earthquake of 1732 struck as Mass was in progress in the cathedral. The cathedral fell in. Fifty of those in attendance were killed, the other twenty-five wounded in various degrees of seriousness. Many houses were destroyed copmpletely, the rest were seriously damaged.

=== After Napoleon ===
Following the extinction of the Napoleonic Kingdom of Italy, the Congress of Vienna authorized the restoration of the Papal States and the Kingdom of Naples. Since the French occupation had seen the abolition of many Church institutions in the Kingdom, as well as the confiscation of most Church property and resources, it was imperative that Pope Pius VII and King Ferdinand IV reach agreement on restoration and restitution.

A concordat was finally signed on 16 February 1818, and ratified by Pius VII on 25 February 1818. Ferdinand issued the concordat as a law on 21 March 1818. The re-erection of the dioceses of the kingdom and the ecclesiastical provinces took more than three years. The right of the king to nominate the candidate for a vacant bishopric was recognized, as in the Concordat of 1741, subject to papal confirmation (preconisation). On 27 June 1818, Pius VII issued the bull De Ulteriore, in which he reestablished the metropolitan archbishopric of Conza. At the same time he abolished the diocese of Satriano, which had been united aeque principaliter with the diocese of Campagna, and incorporated the territory of Satriano into the diocese of Campagna. The diocese of Campagna was assigned to the archdiocese of Conza, in such a way that the archbishop of Conza was also the perpetual administrator of the diocese of Campagna.

=== Nineteenth Century ===
In 1885, the diocese of Conza had a total population of 75,371 in twenty-seven parishes. The seminary had eleven teachers and forty students.

== Chapter and cathedral ==
The cathedral church of Conza is dedicated to the Assumption of the body of the Virgin Mary into heaven. The original building was destroyed in the earthquakes of the late 10th century.

It was administered by a corporate body called the Chapter, composed of three dignities (the Archdeacon, the Cantor, and the Primicerius) and eight canons. There were also minor clergy, who carried out religious functions in the cathedral. In 1885, the Chapter consisted of three dignities (Archdeacon, Cantor, Primicerius) and six canons, one of whom was Canon Theologus.

== Diocese of Campagna ==
The city of Satriano, which was the seat of a bishop, was completely deserted. At the request of the Emperor Charles V, in his capacity as King of Naples, Pope Clement VII created the diocese of Campagna on 19 June 1525, uniting it with the diocese of Satriano, aeque personaliter (two dioceses with one and the same bishop). Both were assigned to the metropolitanate of Salerno. The city of Campagna belonged to the Marchesi Grimaldi. The cathedral church of Campagna was dedicated to S. Antoninus.

The see was vacant from 1793 to 1818, when Pope Pius VII placed it under the perpetual administratorship of the archbishop of Conza. In 1885, the diocese of Conza had a total population of 75,371 in twenty-seven parishes. The diocese of Campagna had ten parishes with 19,674 Catholics.

By a decree of Pope Benedict XV on 30 September 1921, the diocese of Campagna became independent of the archdiocese of Conza. On 4 August 1973, the Archbishop of Salerno, Gaetano Pollio (1969-1984), was also named bishop of Campagna. The three dioceses of Salerno, Acerno, and Campagna were held aeque principaliter. On 30 September 1986, by a decree of Pope John Paul II, the three dioceses were united into one entity, the archdiocese of Salerno-Campagna-Acerno.

== Diocesan Reorganization ==
Following the Second Vatican Council, and in accordance with the norms laid out in the council's decree, Christus Dominus chapter 40, Pope Paul VI ordered a reorganization of the ecclesiastical provinces in southern Italy. He ordered consultations among the members of the Congregation of Bishops in the Vatican Curia, the Italian Bishops Conference, and the various dioceses concerned.

On 18 February 1984, the Vatican and the Italian State signed a new and revised concordat. Based on the revisions, a set of Normae was issued on 15 November 1984, which was accompanied in the next year, on 3 June 1985, by enabling legislation. According to the agreement, the practice of having one bishop govern two separate dioceses at the same time, aeque personaliter, was abolished. The Vatican continued consultations which had begun under Pope John XXIII for the merging of small dioceses, especially those with personnel and financial problems, into one combined diocese.

On 30 September 1986, Pope John Paul II ordered that the dioceses of Conza, S. Angelo dei Lombardi, Bisaccio, and Nusco be merged into one diocese with one bishop, with the Latin title Archidioecesis Sancti Angeli de Lombardis-Compsana-Nuscana-Bisaciensis. The seat of the diocese was to be in S. Angelo dei Lombardi, and its cathedral was to serve as the cathedral of the merged diocese. The cathedrals in Conza, Bisaccio, and Nusco were to have the honorary titles of "co-cathedral"; the cathedral Chapters were each to be a Capitulum Concathedralis. There was to be only one diocesan Tribunal, in S. Angelo, and likewise one seminary, one College of Consultors, and one Priests' Council. The territory of the new diocese was to include the territory of the suppressed dioceses. The new diocese was to be a suffragan of the archdiocese of Benevento.

== Bishops of Conza ==
Erected: 8th Century
Latin Name: Compsana

- Lando (attested 743)

[Petrus]

- Petrus (attested 1059)

== Archbishops of Conza ==
Elevated: 11th Century
Latin Name: Compsana

=== 1100 to 1422 ===
...

- Robertus (attested 1128–1129)

...

- Herbertus (c. 1169–c. 1179?)
- Gervasius (attested 1184–1187)

...

- Pantaleon (1200–1222)
- [Anonymous] (1224) Archbishop-elect
- Jacobus (1225–1230)

...

- Marinus (before 1253)

Sede vacante (1253–1254)

- Nicolaus Bonifacii de Neapoli (1254–1266)
- [Anonymous] (1266-1268) Archbishop-elect

Sede vacante (1268–1274)

- Andreas de Albeto (1274–1277)
- Stephanus de Orinigo (1277–1279 Resigned)
- Laurentius, O.P. (1279–1294?)
- Adenulfus (1294–1301)
- Consilius (Gatti), O.P. (1301–1326)
- Leo da Montecavioso (1327–1332)
- Petrus (1332–1346)
- Laurentius (1346–1351)
- Philippus, O.Carm. (1351–1356)
- Bartholomaeus (1356–1388?)
- Mellus Albito (1390– after 1412) Roman Obedience
- Bernardus de Villaria (1388–1395) Avignon Obedience
- Nicholas (1395–1409) Avignon Obedience
- Nicholas da Cassia, O.Min. (1409–1422) Avignon Obedience

=== 1422 to 1811 ===
- Gaspard de Diano (20 May 1422 –1438)
- Latino Orsini (1438–1439)
- Raimondus, O.S.Bas. (1439–1455)
- Giovanni Conti (1455–1484 Resigned)
- Nicolaus Gratus dei Conti (1484–1494)
- Francesco Conti (8 Oct 1494 – 11 Sep 1517 Resigned)
- Camillo Gesualdo (11 Sep 1517 – 14 Jun 1535 Resigned)

Andrea Matteo Palmieri (1535 Resigned) Administrator

- Troiano Gesualdo (1535–1539) Administrator
- Niccolò Caetani di Sermoneta (1539–1546) Administrator
- Marcello Crescenzi (1546–1552) Administrator
- Ambrogio Catarino Politi, O.P. (1552–1553)
- Gerolamo Muzzarelli, O.P. (11 Dec 1553 – 1561)
- Alfonso Gesualdo di Conza (Gonza) (14 Apr 1561 – 18 Nov 1572 Resigned)
- Salvatore Caracciolo, C.R. (19 Nov 1572 – Nov 1573)
- Marcantonio Pescara (15 Mar 1574 – 1584)
- Scipione Gesualdo (28 Nov 1584 – 1608)
- Bartolomeo Cesi (cardinal) (10 Mar 1608 – 3 Mar 1614 Resigned)
- Curzio Cocci (3 Mar 1614 – Nov 1621 Died)
- Fabio Lagonissa (21 Feb 1622 – 1645 Resigned)
- Ercole Rangoni (archbishop) (24 Apr 1645 – 13 Feb 1650)
- Fabrizio Campana, O.S.B. (22 May 1651 – 17 Sep 1667)
- Giacomo Lenza, O.S.B. (14 Nov 1667 – Aug 1672)
- Paolo Caravita, O.S.B. (16 Jan 1673 – 26 Sep 1681)
- Gaetano Caracciolo, C.R. (8 Jun 1682 – 11 Aug 1709)
- Francesco Paolo Nicolai (2 Sep 1716 – 7 Apr 1731 Resigned)
- Giuseppe Nicolai (9 Apr 1731 – 27 Oct 1758)
- Marcello Capano Orsini (12 Feb 1759 – 28 Jun 1765)
- Cesare Antonio Caracciolo, C.R. (9 Dec 1765 – 27 Oct 1776)
- Ignazio Andrea Sambiase, C.R. (16 Dec 1776 – 26 May 1799)
- Gioacchino Maria Mancusi (26 Jun 1805 – 1811 Died)

== Archbishops of Conza e Campagna ==
United: 27 June 1818 with the Diocese of Satriano e Campagna
Latin Name: Compsana et Campaniensis

Sede vacante (1811–1818)

- Michelangelo Lupoli (25 May 1818 Confirmed – 30 Sep 1831 Confirmed, Archbishop of Salerno-Acerno)
- Gennaro Pellini (2 Jul 1832 Confirmed – 6 Oct 1835 Died)
- Leone Ciampa, O.F.M. Disc. (1 Feb 1836 Confirmed – 22 Dec 1848 Confirmed, Archbishop of Sorrento)
- Giuseppe Pappalardo (22 Dec 1848 Confirmed – 19 Dec 1849 Resigned)
- Gregorio De Luca (20 May 1850 Confirmed – 15 Aug 1878 Died)
- Salvatore Nappi (28 Feb 1879 – 18 Oct 1896 Resigned)
- Antonio Maria Buglione (18 Oct 1896 Succeeded – 20 Feb 1904 Died)
- Nicola Piccirilli (14 Nov 1904 – 25 Apr 1918 Appointed, Archbishop of Lanciano e Ortona)
- Carmine Cesarano, C.SS.R. (30 Sep 1918 – 30 Sep 1921 Appointed, Archbishop (Personal Title) of Campagna)

== Archbishops of Conza-Sant'Angelo dei Lombardi-Bisaccia ==
United: 30 September 1921 with the Diocese of Sant'Angelo dei Lombardi e Bisaccia
Territory Lost: 30 September 1921 to form the Diocese of Campagna
Latin Name: Compsana-Sancti Angeli de Lombardis-Bisaciensis
Metropolitan See

- Giulio Tommasi (30 Sep 1921 – 15 Aug 1936 Died)
- Aniello Calcara (30 Aug 1937 – 1 Jul 1940 Appointed, Archbishop of Cosenza)
- Antonio Melomo (28 Aug 1940 – 28 Jun 1945 Died)
- Cristoforo Domenico Carullo, O.F.M. (15 Sep 1946 – 31 Jan 1968 Died)
- Gastone Mojaisky-Perrelli (4 Aug 1973 – 18 Nov 1978 Resigned)
- Mario Miglietta (18 Nov 1978 – 21 Feb 1981 Appointed, Archbishop (Personal Title) of Ugento-Santa Maria di Leuca)
- Antonio Nuzzi (21 Feb 1981 – 31 Dec 1988 Appointed, Archbishop (Personal Title) of Teramo-Atri)

== Archbishops of Sant'Angelo dei Lombardi–Conza–Nusco–Bisaccia ==
United: 30 September 1986 with the Diocese of Nusco
Latin Name: Sancti Angeli de Lombardis-Compsana-Nuscana-Bisaciensis

- Mario Milano (14 Dec 1989 – 28 Feb 1998 Appointed, Archbishop (Personal Title) of Aversa)
- Salvatore Nunnari (30 Jan 1999 – 18 Dec 2004 Appointed, Archbishop of Cosenza-Bisignano)
- Francesco Alfano (14 May 2005 – 10 Mar 2012 Appointed, Archbishop of Sorrento-Castellammare di Stabia)
- Pasquale Cascio (27 Oct 2012 – )

== See also ==
Roman Catholic Diocese of Satriano e Campagna

== Bibliography ==
=== Episcopal lists ===
- Eubel, Conradus, ed. (1913). Hierarchia catholica (in Latin). Vol. I (second ed.). Münster: Libreria Regensbergiana.
- Eubel, Conradus, ed. (1914). Hierarchia catholica (in Latin). Vol. II (second ed.). Münster: Libreria Regensbergiana.
- Eubel, Conradus; Gulik, Guilelmus (1923). Hierarchia catholica (in Latin). Vol. III (second ed.). Münster: Libreria Regensbergiana.
- Gams, Pius Bonifatius (1873). Series episcoporum Ecclesiae catholicae: quotquot innotuerunt a beato Petro apostolo (in Latin). Ratisbon: Typis et Sumptibus Georgii Josephi Manz. pp. 852–853.
- Gauchat, Patritius (Patrice) (1935). Hierarchia catholica (in Latin). Vol. IV (1592-1667). Münster: Libraria Regensbergiana.
- Ritzler, Remigius; Sefrin, Pirminus (1952). Hierarchia catholica medii et recentis aevi (in Latin). Vol. V (1667-1730). Patavii: Messagero di S. Antonio.
- Ritzler, Remigius; Sefrin, Pirminus (1958). Hierarchia catholica medii et recentis aevi (in Latin). Vol. VI (1730-1799). Patavii: Messagero di S. Antonio.
- Ritzler, Remigius; Sefrin, Pirminus (1968). Hierarchia Catholica medii et recentioris aevi (in Latin). Vol. VII (1800–1846). Monasterii: Libreria Regensburgiana.
- Remigius Ritzler; Pirminus Sefrin (1978). Hierarchia catholica Medii et recentioris aevi (in Latin). Vol. VIII (1846–1903). Il Messaggero di S. Antonio.
- Pięta, Zenon (2002). Hierarchia catholica medii et recentioris aevi (in Latin). Vol. IX (1903–1922). Padua: Messagero di San Antonio. ISBN 978-88-250-1000-8.

=== Studies ===
- Cappelletti, Giuseppe (1870). Le chiese d'Italia: dalla loro origine sino ai nostri giorni (in Italian). Vol. vigesimo (20). Venezia: G. Antonelli. pp. 513–531.
- Cestaro, Antonio (1972). Le diocesi di Conza e di Campagna nell'età della Restaurazione. (in Italian). Roma: Edizioni di storia e letteratura 1972.
- D'Avino, Vincenzio (1848). Cenni storici sulle chiese arcivescovili, vescovili, e prelatizie (nullius) del regno delle due Sicilie (in Italian). Naples: dalle stampe di Ranucci. pp. 222–229. [article written by Bonaventura Ricotti]
- Gargano, G. (1925). "La Chiesa di Conza e i suoi Arcivescovi," (in Italian), in: La Guida Diocesana, Bisaccia (Avellino), 1925.
- Kamp, Norbert (1973). Kirche und Monarchie im staufischen Königreich Sizilien: Prosopographische Grundlegung; Bistümer und Bischöfe des Königreichs 1194-1266. 1. (in German). Münster: W. Fink, 1973.
- Kehr, Paul Fridolin (1962). Regesta pontificum Romanorum. Italia pontificia, Vol.IX: Samnium—Apulia—Lucania. ed. Walter Holtzmann. Berlin: Weidemann. (in Latin) pp. 506–509.
- Mattei-Cerasoli, L. (1918), "Di alcuni vescovi poco noti," (in Italian), in: Archivio storico per le provincie Napolitane XLIII (n.s. IV 1918), pp. 363–382.
- Ughelli, Ferdinando; Coleti, Niccolo (1720). Italia sacra sive De episcopis Italiæ, et insularum adjacentium (in Latin). Vol. Tomus sextus (6). Venice: apud Sebastianum Coleti. pp. 797–829.
- Gams, Pius Bonifatius (1873). Series episcoporum Ecclesiae catholicae: quotquot innotuerunt a beato Petro apostolo (in Latin). Ratisbon: Typis et Sumptibus Georgii Josephi Manz.
