= Castelfranci =

- Comune
- Comune di Castelfranci
- Coat of arms

- Location within Italy Location within Campania
- Coordinates: 40°55′56″N 15°2′39″E
- Country: Italy
- Region: Campania
- Province: Avellino (AV)

Government
  - Mayor: Generoso Cresta

Area
  - Total: 11.69 km^{2} (4.51 sq mi)
- Elevation: 450 m (1,480 ft)

Population (30 June 2017)
  - Total: 1,996
  - Density: 170.7/km^{2} (442.2/sq mi)
- Demonym: Castellesi
- Time zone: UTC+1 (CET)
  - Summer (DST): UTC+2 (CEST)
- Postal code: 83040
- Dialing code: 0827
- Patron saint: St. Nicholas of Bari
- Saint day: 9 May
- Website: Official website

Castelfranci (Neapolitan: Castafrancia; Irpino: Castiella) is a town and comune in the province of Avellino, Campania, southern Italy.
