= Giovanni Luigi Guarini =

Italian Roman Catholic prelate

Most Reverend Giovanni Luigi Guarini
- Bishop of Aquino
- Church: Catholic Church
- Diocese: Diocese of Aquino
- In office: 1579
- Predecessor: Adriano Fuscone
- Successor: Flaminio Filonardi

Personal details
- Died: November 1579 Aquino, Italy

Giovanni Luigi Guarini (died November 1579) was a Roman Catholic prelate who served as Bishop of Aquino (1579).

On 30 March 1579, Giovanni Luigi Guarini was appointed during the papacy of Pope Gregory XIII as Bishop of Aquino. He served as Bishop of Aquino until his death in November 1579.

== External links and additional sources ==
- Cheney, David M. "Diocese of Aquino e Pontecorvo". Catholic-Hierarchy.org. (for Chronology of Bishops) ^{[self-published]}
- Chow, Gabriel. "Diocese of Aquino (Italy)". GCatholic.org. (for Chronology of Bishops) ^{[self-published]}

Catholic Church titles
Preceded by Adriano Fuscone	Bishop of Aquino; 1579	Succeeded by Flaminio Filonardi
