= Salpe =

Salpe was an ancient Greek midwife cited by Pliny the Elder, and a writer of a work called the Paignia mentioned in Athenaeus' Deipnosophistae. It is uncertain whether Athenaeus and Pliny discuss the same person, or whether they were two distinct people.

== Pliny ==
Pliny cites Salpe six times in his Natural History. She is described by him as an obstetrix, though he ascribes general remedies to her, not simply those concerned with women's health. Her remedies only survive in Pliny's references to them, not in her own words. She uses both herbal and magical remedies to cure a variety of ailments including sunburn, stiff or numbed limbs, and dog bites.

== Athenaeus ==
In the Deipnosophistae, Athenaeus mentions a Salpe as the writer of Paignia. He cites Nymphodorus of Syracuse, probably writing in the third century BC, as claiming that Salpe, the writer of the Paignia, was not a nickname for a Mnaseas, but was a woman from Lesbos.

The Paignia is generally considered to have been a work of pornographic or erotic literature. Athenaeus associates the work with Botrys of Messana, a fifth-century author described as a "shameful writer" by Timaeus. Botrys' work was apparently similar to the pornographic sex-manual attributed to Philaenis. The work was probably written in prose, as Botrys' earlier paignia had been.

James Davidson argues that the Salpe mentioned by Athenaeus and the one cited by Pliny are likely to have been the same person. David Bain has argued against Davidson's suggestion, and I. M. Plant distinguishes between the two in his anthology of ancient women writers. More recently, Rebecca Flemming writes that "despite Bain's objections it remains tempting" to link Pliny's and Athenaeus' Salpe; she suggests that the original Paignia referred to by Athenaeus was the original source of Pliny's recipes, though he would have read them second-hand (or "more probably third- or fourth-hand").

== Works cited ==
- Bain, David (1998). "Salpe's ΠΑΙΓΝΙΑ: Athenaeus 332A and Plin. H. N. 28.38". The Classical Quarterly. 48 (1). doi:10.1093/cq/48.1.262.
- Davidson, James N. (1995). "Don't Try This at Home: Pliny's Salpe, Salpe's Paignia and Magic". The Classical Quarterly. 45 (2): 590–592. doi:10.1017/S000983880004372X. S2CID 170720854.
- Flemming, Rebecca (2007). "Women, Writing and Medicine in the Classical World". The Classical Quarterly. 57 (1): 257–279. doi:10.1017/S0009838807000225. S2CID 171045159.
- Plant, I. M., ed. (2004). Woman Writers of Ancient Greece and Rome: An Anthology. Norman: University of Oklahoma Press.
