= Adriano Fuscone =

16th-century Roman Catholic bishop

Most Reverend Adriano Fuscone
- Bishop of Aquino
- Church: Catholic Church
- Diocese: Diocese of Aquino
- In office: 1552–1578
- Predecessor: Galeazzo Florimonte
- Successor: Giovanni Luigi Guarini

Orders
- Consecration: 16 Dec 1554 by Giovanni Michele Saraceni

Personal details
- Died: 1578

Adriano Fuscone (died 1578) was a Roman Catholic prelate who served as Bishop of Aquino (1552–1578).

== Biography ==
On 22 Oct 1552, Adriano Fuscone was appointed during the papacy of Pope Julius III as Bishop of Aquino. On 16 Dec 1554, he was consecrated bishop by Giovanni Michele Saraceni, Archbishop of Acerenza e Matera, with Ascanio Ferreri, Bishop Emeritus of Montepeloso, and Giovanni Andrea Croce, Bishop of Tivoli, serving as co-consecrators. He served as Bishop of Aquino until his death in 1578.

== Episcopal succession ==
Episcopal succession of Adriano Fuscone

While bishop, he was the principal co-consecrator of:

- Romolo Cesi, Bishop of Narni (1566);
- Egidio Valenti, Bishop of Nepi e Sutri (1566);
- Matteo Andrea Guerra, Bishop of Fondi (1567);
- Jerome de Leonibus, Bishop of Sagone (1567);
- Giovan Mario de Alessandri, Bishop of Oppido Mamertina (1567);
- Girolamo Rustici, Bishop of Tropea (1570);
- Giulio Fioretti, Bishop of Chiron (1572); and
- Marco Saracini, Bishop of Volterra (1574).

== External links and additional sources ==
- Cheney, David M. "Diocese of Aquino e Pontecorvo". Catholic-Hierarchy.org. (for Chronology of Bishops) ^{[self-published]}
- Chow, Gabriel. "Diocese of Aquino (Italy)". GCatholic.org. (for Chronology of Bishops) ^{[self-published]}

Catholic Church titles
Preceded by Galeazzo Florimonte	Bishop of Aquino; 1552–1578	Succeeded by Giovanni Luigi Guarini
