= Gioacchino Illiano =

Italian priest and theologian (1935–2020)

- Bishop of Nocera Inferiore-Sarno
- Church: Catholic Church
- Diocese: Diocese of Nocera Inferiore-Sarno
- In office: 8 August 1987 – 24 March 2011
- Predecessor: Jolando Nuzzi
- Successor: Giuseppe Giudice
- Other post: Apostolic Administrator of Amalfi-Cava de' Tirreni (1990-1991)

Orders
- Ordination: 2 July 1961 by Demetrio Moscato
- Consecration: 3 October 1987 by Guerino Grimaldi

Personal details
- Born: 27 July 1935 Bacoli, Province of Naples, Kingdom of Italy
- Died: 6 February 2020 (aged 84) Nocera Superiore, Campania, Italy

Gioacchino Illiano (27 July 1935 – 6 February 2020) was an Italian Roman Catholic bishop.

Illiano was born in Italy and was ordained to the priesthood in 1961. He served as the bishop of the Roman Catholic Diocese of Nocera Inferiore-Sarno, Italy. from 1987 to 2011.
