= Archdiocese of Sorrento-Castellammare di Stabia =

Roman Catholic archdiocese in Italy

Coordinates: 43.6767°N 4.6278°E

Archdiocese of Sorrento-Castellammare di Stabia Archidioecesis Surrentina-Castri Maris o Stabiensis

Catholic
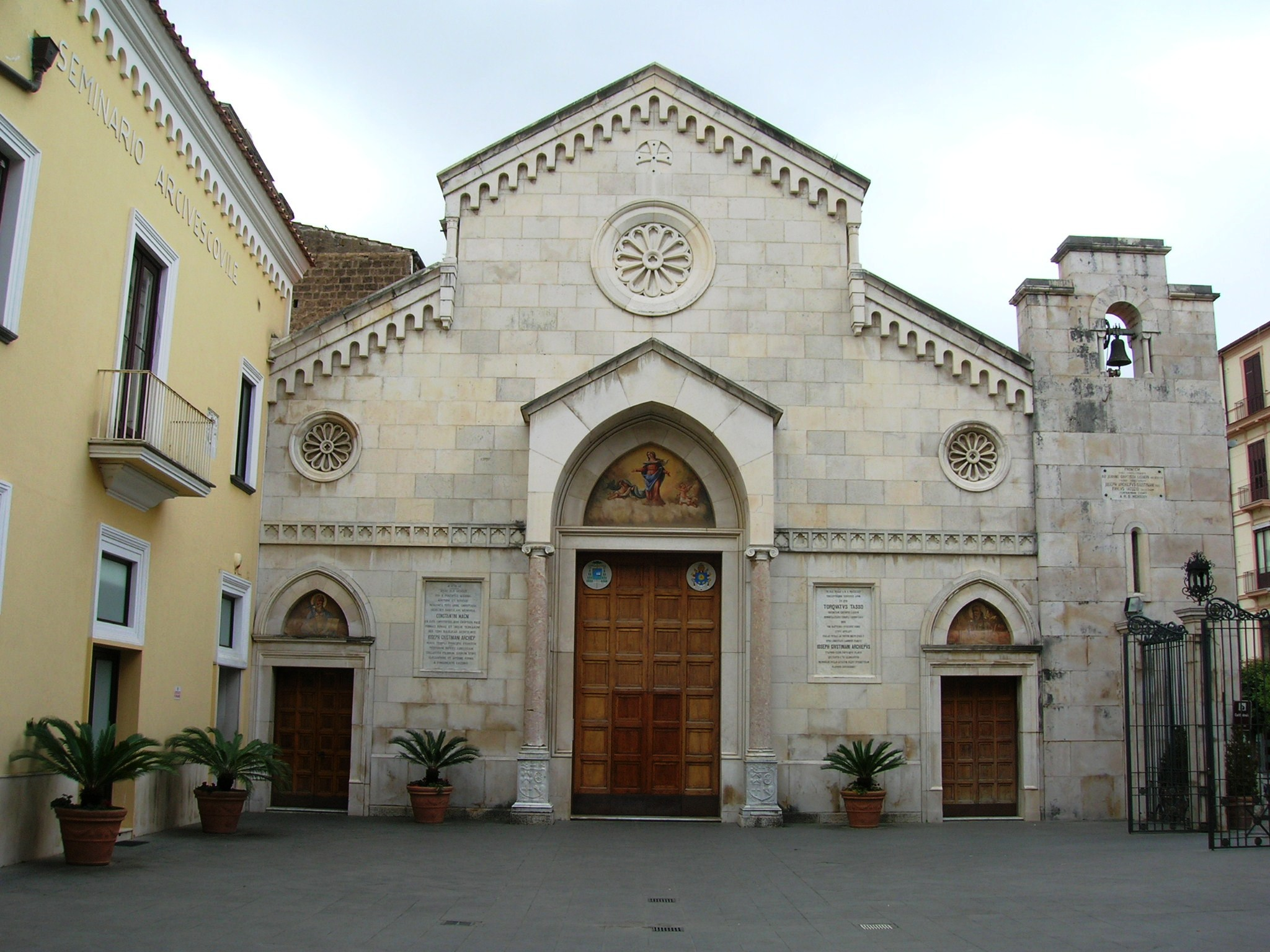
- Sorrento Cathedral

Location
- Country: Italy
- Ecclesiastical province: Naples

Statistics
- Area: 205 km^{2} (79 sq mi)
- Population: Total; Catholics: (as of 2017); 231,201 (est.); 227,000 (guess)
- Parishes: 88

Information
- Denomination: Catholic Church
- Rite: Roman Rite
- Established: 5th Century
- Cathedral: Cattedrale di Ss. Filippo e Giacomo (Sorrento)
- Co-cathedral: Concattedrale di S. Maria Assunta (Castellammare di Stabia)
- Secular priests: 121 (diocesan); 32 (Religious Orders); 5 Permanent Deacons

Current leadership
- Pope: Leo XIV
- Archbishop: Francesco Alfano

Website
- www.diocesisorrentocmare.it

The Archdiocese of Sorrento-Castellammare di Stabia (Latin: Archidioecesis Surrentina-Castri Maris o Stabiensis) is a Latin archdiocese of the Catholic Church in Campania, has existed in its current form since 1986. It is a suffragan of the Archdiocese of Naples, having lost its status as a metropolitan in 1979. The Diocese of Castellammare di Stabia was suppressed, and its territory united with the Archdiocese of Sorrento, in 1986. In 2014, in the diocese of Sorrento there was one priest for every 1,503 Catholics.

== History ==
In the tenth century Sorrento became a metropolitan see. Previous to that time it had been directly dependent upon the Holy See (Papacy), and its bishops attended the Roman synods.

In 1558 the Turks under Piyale Pasha effected a landing at Salerno, and plundered and burned the city, on which occasion the archives perished. The new bishop, Giulio Pavesi, sought to repair the damages. Bishop Filippo Anastasi (1699) defended the immunities of the Church and was forcibly exiled to Terracina.

=== Cathedral and Chapter ===
The cathedral of Sorrento was dedicated to the Apostles Philip and James. The cathedral has the care of souls (cura animarum), who are in the care of the Dean of the Chapter.

The cathedral was staffed and administered by a corporation, the Chapter, composed of five dignities (the Archdeacon, the Primicerius, the Cantor, the Dean, and the Treasurer) and twelve Canons.

Archbishop Giulio Pavesi presided over a provincial synod in 1567. Archbishop Lelio Brancaccio (1571–1574) presided over a provincial synod in 1574.

Bishop Antonio de Pezzo (1641–1659) presided over a diocesan synod in Sorrento in 1654. Bishop Gabriele Papa (1824–1837) held a diocesan synod in the cathedral of Sorrento on 5–8 June 1827.

Bishop Diego Pietra (1680) founded the seminary, afterwards enlarged by Bishop Filippo Anastasi (1699).

=== Concordat of 1818 ===
Following the extinction of the Napoleonic Kingdom of Italy, the Congress of Vienna authorized the restoration of the Papal States and the Kingdom of Naples. Since the French occupation had seen the abolition of many Church institutions in the Kingdom, as well as the confiscation of most Church property and resources, it was imperative that Pope Pius VII and King Ferdinand IV reach agreement on restoration and restitution. Ferdinand, however, was not prepared to accept the pre-Napoleonic situation, in which Naples was a feudal subject of the papacy. Lengthy, detailed, and acrimonious negotiations ensued.

In 1818, a new concordat with the Kingdom of the Two Sicilies committed the pope to the suppression of more than fifty small dioceses in the kingdom. Pope Pius VII, in the bull "De Utiliori" of 27 June 1818, suppressed the dioceses of Massa Lubrense, Vico Equense (Vicana), and Capri, and their territories were added to Sorrento. Sorrento was left with only one suffragan, the diocese of Castellamare. In the same concordat, the King was confirmed in the right to nominate candidates for vacant bishoprics, subject to the approval of the pope. That situation persisted down until the final overthrow of the Bourbon monarchy in 1860.

In 1860, the Bourbon monarchy in the south of Italy and Sicily was permanently suppressed, and the Kingdom of the Two Sicilies became part of the Savoyard Kingdom of Italy. Many of the clergy in the south followed the lead of Pius IX in resisting the king of Turin, who had annexed the entire Papal States, with the exception of the city of Rome. In 1861, Archbishop Francesco Apuzzo of Sorrento was, by order of the new Government, exiled to France.

=== Loss of metropolitan status ===
Following the Second Vatican Council, and in accordance with the norms laid out in the Council's decree, Christus Dominus chapter 40, major changes were made in the ecclesiastical administrative structure of southern Italy. Wide consultations had taken place with the bishops and other prelates who would be affected. Action, however, was deferred, first by the death of Pope Paul VI on 6 August 1978, then the death of Pope John Paul I on 28 September 1978, and the election of Pope John Paul II on 16 October 1978. Pope John Paul II issued a decree, "Quamquam Ecclesia," on 30 April 1979, ordering the changes. Three ecclesiastical provinces were abolished entirely: those of Conza, Capua, and Sorrento. A new ecclesiastical province was created, to be called the Regio Campana, whose Metropolitan was the Archbishop of Naples. The archbishop of Sorrento continued to enjoy the title of Archbishop, but he was no longer a metropolitan archbishop.

=== Acquisition of territory ===
On 18 February 1984, the Vatican and the Italian State signed a new and revised concordat, which was accompanied in the next year by enabling legislation. According to the agreement, the practice of having one bishop govern two separate dioceses at the same time, aeque personaliter, was abolished. The Vatican continued consultations which had begun under Pope John XXIII for the merging of small dioceses, especially those with personnel and financial problems, into one combined diocese. On 30 September 1986, Pope John Paul II ordered that the dioceses of Sorrento and Castellamare be merged into one diocese with one bishop, with the Latin title Archidioecesis Surrentina-Castri Maris. The seat of the diocese was to be in Sorrento, and the cathedral of Sorrento was to serve as the cathedral of the merged diocese. The cathedral in Castellamare was to become a co-cathedral, and the cathedral Chapter was to be a Capitulum Concathedralis. There was to be only one diocesan Tribunal, in Sorrento, and likewise one seminary, one College of Consultors, and one Priests' Council. The territory of the new diocese was to include the territory of the former dioceses of Sorrento and of Castellamare.

== Bishops and Archbishops ==
=== Diocese of Sorrento ===
- Renatus of Sorrento (5th century)

...

- Quingesius (attested 494)

...

- Valerius (453?)

...

- Rosarius (attested 499)

...

- Athanasius (6th century?)

...

- Joannes (attested 591, 594, 600)
- Amandus (600–617)

...

- Baculus (7th century)

...

- Hyacinthus (attested 679)

...

- Stephanus (attested 871)

...

- Leopardus

...

- Sergius (c. 980)

...

- Maraldus (attested 1005)

...

- Joannes (attested 1059–1071)

...

=== Archdiocese of Sorrento ===
Elevated: 1068

==== 1068 to 1500 ====
...

- Barbatus (attested 1110)

...

- Urso (attested 1141)
- Philippus (attested 1149)

...

- Alferius (died 1238)
- Petrus (c. 1240)
- Petrus (1252–1259)
- Ludovicus de Alexandro (attested 1266)
- Petrus de Corneliaco, O.Min. (1268– ? )
- Jacobus de Magistro Judice (1278–1285)
- Marcus Mirabello (1286–1305)
- Francesco (1306–1318)
- Ricardo (8 Jun 1319 – 1320)
- Matthaeus de Capua. O.Min. (1320–c.1332)
- Petrus (1332–1341)
- Andreas Seri Sale (Sersale) (1341–1348)
- Petrus (1348–1360?)
- Guilelmus de Aleyraco (1361–1374?)
- Franciscus de Fulgineo, O.E.S.A. (1374–1390?)
- Robertus Brancia (1390–1409) Roman Obedience
- Angelus (1410–1412) Roman Obedience
- Bartolomeo de Miserata (1412–1440?)
- Antonio Bretone (Ferrier) (1440–1442)
- Domizio Falangola (17 Oct 1442 – 8 Jan 1470)
- Scipione Cicinelli (15 Jan 1470 –1474)
- Giacomo de Sanctis (1474–1479)
- Nardo Mormile (1480–1493)
- Menelao Gennari (1493–1501)

==== from 1500 to 1800 ====
- Francisco de Remolins (31 Mar 1501 Confirmed –1512)
- Gisbertus de Remolins (22 Oct 1512 – 1525)
- Filippo Strozzi, O.P. (1525–1530 Resigned)
- Florent Coquerel (1530–1544)
- Bernardino Silverii-Piccolomini (1545–1552)
- Bartolomeo Albani (1552–1558)
- Giulio Pavesi, O.P. (1558–1571)
- Lelio Brancaccio (1571–1574)
- Giuseppe Donzelli, O.P. (1574–1588)
- Muzio Bongiovanni (27 Apr 1588 – 27 Nov 1590)
- Carlo Baldini (1591–1598)
- Gerolamo Provenzale (1 Jun 1598 – 22 Mar 1612)
- Giovanni Antonio Angrisani, C.R. (4 Jun 1612 – 29 Aug 1641)
- Antonio del Pezzo (27 Nov 1641 – 12 Mar 1659)
- Paolo Suardo, C.O. (10 Nov 1659 – 29 Jul 1679)
- Diego Petra (29 Apr 1680 – 1 Feb 1699)
- Filippo Anastasio (11 Apr 1699 – 13 Dec 1724 Resigned)
- Ludovico Agnello Anastasio (20 Dec 1724 – 19 Feb 1758)
- Giuseppe Sersale (13 Mar 1758 – 10 Jan 1759)
- Silvestro Pepe (4 Apr 1759 – 23 Jun 1803)

==== since 1800 ====
- Vincenzo Calà (1805–1817)
- Michele Spinelli, C.R. (1818–1824)
- Gabriele Papa (1824–1837)
- Nicola Giuseppe Ugo (1839–1843)
- Domenico Silvestri (17 Jun 1844 – 15 Sep 1848)
- Leone Ciampa, O.F.M. Disc. (22 Dec 1848 – 9 Sep 1854)
- Francesco Saverio Apuzzo (1855–1871)
- Mariano Ricciardi (24 Nov 1871 – 23 Aug 1876 Died)
- Leopoldo Ruggiero (1877–1886)
- Giuseppe Giustiniani (7 Jun 1886 – 2 Jul 1917)
- Paolo Jacuzio (9 Jul 1917 – 19 May 1944)
- Carlo Serena (22 Oct 1945 Succeeded – 30 Jul 1972)
- Raffaele Pellecchia (30 Jul 1972 Succeeded – 3 May 1977)
- Antonio Zama (27 Aug 1977 – 7 Jul 1988)

=== Archdiocese of Sorrento-Castellammare di Stabia ===
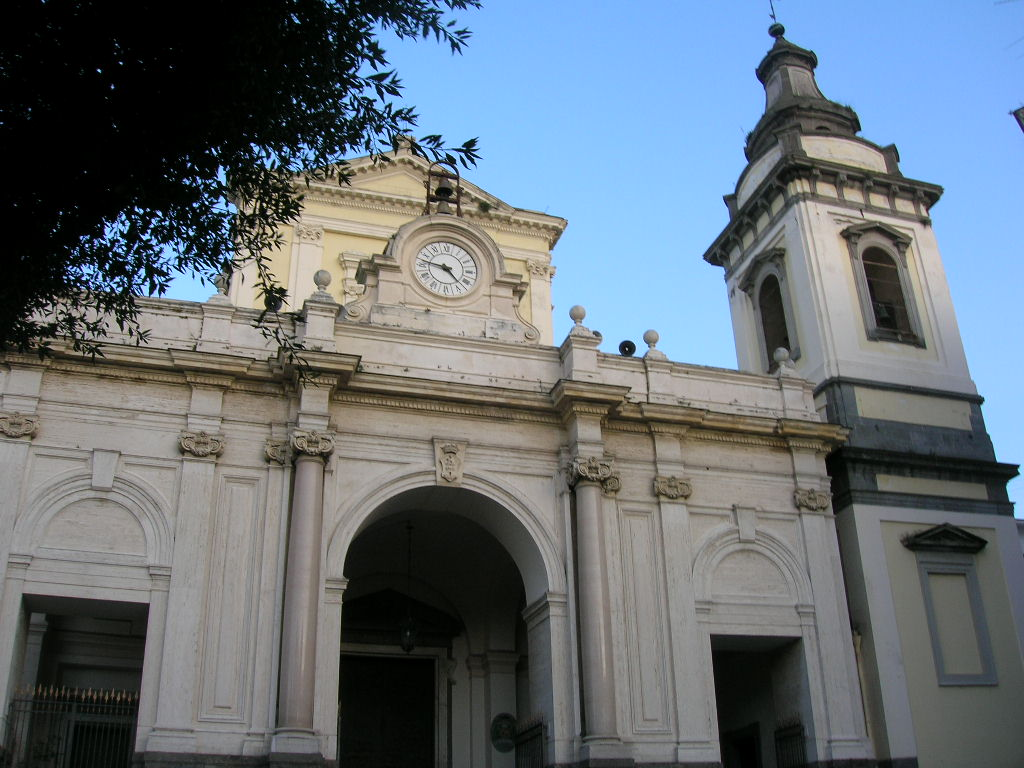
Co-cathedral of Castellammare di Stabia

United: 30 September 1986 with the Diocese of Castellammare di Stabia
Latin Name: Surrentinus-Castri Maris o Stabiensis
Metropolitan: Archdiocese of Naples

- Felice Cece (8 Feb 1989 – 10 Mar 2012 Retired)
- Francesco Alfano (10 Mar 2012 – )

== Bibliography ==
=== Reference works ===
- Gams, Pius Bonifatius (1873). Series episcoporum Ecclesiae catholicae: quotquot innotuerunt a beato Petro apostolo. Ratisbon: Typis et Sumptibus Georgii Josephi Manz. p. 926-927.(Use with caution; obsolete)
- Eubel, Conradus, ed. (1913). Hierarchia catholica (in Latin). Vol. Tomus 1 (second ed.). Münster: Libreria Regensbergiana. (in Latin)
- Eubel, Conradus, ed. (1914). Hierarchia catholica (in Latin). Vol. Tomus 2 (second ed.). Münster: Libreria Regensbergiana.
- Eubel, Conradus; Gulik, Guilelmus (1923). Hierarchia catholica (in Latin). Vol. Tomus 3 (second ed.). Münster: Libreria Regensbergiana.
- Gauchat, Patritius (Patrice) (1935). Hierarchia catholica. Vol. Tomus IV (1592-1667). Münster: Libraria Regensbergiana.
- Ritzler, Remigius; Sefrin, Pirminus (1952). Hierarchia catholica medii et recentis aevi. Vol. Tomus V (1667-1730). Patavii: Messagero di S. Antonio.
- Ritzler, Remigius; Sefrin, Pirminus (1958). Hierarchia catholica medii et recentis aevi. Vol. Tomus VI (1730-1799). Patavii: Messagero di S. Antonio.
- Ritzler, Remigius; Sefrin, Pirminus (1968). Hierarchia Catholica medii et recentioris aevi (in Latin). Vol. VII (1800–1846). Monasterii: Libreria Regensburgiana.
- Remigius Ritzler; Pirminus Sefrin (1978). Hierarchia catholica Medii et recentioris aevi (in Latin). Vol. VIII (1846–1903). Il Messaggero di S. Antonio.
- Pięta, Zenon (2002). Hierarchia catholica medii et recentioris aevi (in Latin). Vol. IX (1903–1922). Padua: Messagero di San Antonio. ISBN 978-88-250-1000-8.

=== Studies ===
- Bonaventura da Sorrento (1877). Sorrento: Sorrento sacra e Sorrento illustre. Epitome della storia sorrentina pel p. Bonaventura da Sorrento ... (in Italian). Sorrento: Tipografia all'insegna di S. Francesco d'Assisi.
- Camera, Matteo (1848), "Sorrento," in: Vincenzo D'Avino (1848). Cenni storici sulle chiese arcivescovili, vescovili, e prelatizie (nullius) del Regno delle Due Sicilie (in Italian). dalle stampe di Ranucci. pp. 641-651.
- Capasso, Bartolommeo (1854). Memorie storiche della chiesa sorrentina compilate da Bartolommeo Capasso (in Italian). Napoli: Stabilimento dell'antologia legale.
- Capone, A. (1927, 1929). Il duomo di Salerno. (in Italian) 2 vol. Salerno 1927-29.
- Cappelletti, Giuseppe (1866). Le chiese d'Italia: dalla loro origine sino ai nostri giorni (in Italian). Vol. decimonono (19). Venice: G. Antonelli. pp. 675–725.
- Carbone, Primo (2003). La Chiesa salernitana nel Risorgimento tra rivoluzione e controrivoluzione: dal brigantaggio rurale all'opposizione borghese (in Italian). Napoli: Controcorrente.
- Collezione degli atti emanati dopo la pubblicazione del Concordato dell'anno 1818: contenente i brevi e le lettere apostoliche, i reali decreti e rescritti, le circolari ed istruzioni pubblicate da aprile 1840 a tutto dicembre 1841; non che una copiosa appendice a' precedenti volumi. 9 (in Italian and Latin). Vol. Parte nona (9). Napoli: Stamperia dell'Iride. 1842.
- Crisci, Generoso (1976). Il cammino della Chiesa salernitana: nell'opera dei suoi vescovi (in Italian). Napoli: Libreria editrice Redenzione.
- Crisci, Generoso; Campagna, Angelo (1962). Salerno sacra: ricerche storiche (in Italian). Salerno: Edizioni della Curia arcivescovile 1962.
- De Angelis, Michele (1936). Il duomo di Salerno nella sua storia, nelle sue vicende e nei suoi monumenti. (in Italian) Salerno, 1936.
- Kamp, Norbert (1973). Kirche und Monarchie im staufischen Königreich Sizilien. Prosopographische Grundlegung. Bistümer und Bischöfe des Königreichs 1194-1266. 1. Abruzzen und Kampanien Münich 1973, pp. 376–381. (in German)
- Kehr, Paul Fridolin (1925). Italia pontificia Vol. VIII (Berlin: Weidmann 1925), pp. 333–366. (in Latin)
- Lanzoni, Francesco (1927). Le diocesi d'Italia dalle origini al principio del secolo VII (an. 604). Faenza: F. Lega, pp. 250–252. (in Italian)
- Paesano, Giuseppe (1846). Memorie per servire alla storia della Chiesa Salernitana (in Italian). Vol. Parte prima. Napoli: Manfredi. Paesano, Giuseppe (1852). Parte seconda.
- Savio, Fedele (1902). "I vescovi di Salerno nei secoli IX e X," in: Atti della R. Accademia delle scienze di Torino 37 (1902), pp. 104–113. (in Italian)
- Ughelli, Ferdinando; Coleti, Niccolo (1720). Italia sacra sive De episcopis Italiæ, et insularum adjacentium (in Latin). Vol. Tomus sextus (6). Venice: apud Sebastianum Coleti. pp. 591–630.
