= Arminio (disambiguation) =

Arminio is an opera composed by George Frideric Handel.

Arminio may also refer to:

- Arminio (Biber), an opera composed by Heinrich Ignaz Franz Biber
- Arminio Fraga (born 1957), Brazilian economist
- Franco Arminio (born 1960), Italian poet and writer
- Fulgenzio Arminio Monforte (1620–1680), Italian Roman Catholic prelate
- Gilberto Arminio de Almeida Rêgo (1895–1970), Brazilian football referee
- Victoriano Sánchez Arminio (1942–2023), Spanish football referee
