= Benedetto Giacinto Sangermano =

Italian Roman Catholic prelate

Most Reverend Benedetto Giacinto Sangermano
- Bishop of Nusco
- Church: Catholic Church
- Diocese: Diocese of Nusco
- In office: 1680–1702
- Predecessor: Fulgenzio Arminio Monforte
- Successor: Giacinto Dragonetti

Orders
- Ordination: 1 April 1673
- Consecration: 13 October 1680 by Carlo Pio di Savoia

Personal details
- Born: 7 January 1638 Bisignano, Italy
- Died: 7 June 1702 (age 64) Nusco, Italy

Benedetto Giacinto Sangermano (7 January 1638 – 7 June 1702) was a Roman Catholic prelate who served as Bishop of Nusco (1680–1702).

== Biography ==
Benedetto Giacinto Sangermano was born in Bisignano, Italy on 7 January 1638 and ordained a priest on 1 April 1673. On 7 October 1680, he was appointed during the papacy of Pope Clement IX as Bishop of Nusco. On 13 October 1680, he was consecrated bishop by Carlo Pio di Savoia, Cardinal-Priest of San Crisogono, with Francesco Casati, Titular Archbishop of Trapezus, and Giuseppe Bologna, Archbishop Emeritus of Benevento, serving as co-consecrators. He served as Bishop of Nusco until his death on 7 June 1702.

== External links and additional sources ==
- Cheney, David M. "Diocese of Nusco". Catholic-Hierarchy.org. (for Chronology of Bishops) ^{[self-published]}
- Chow, Gabriel. "Diocese of Nusco (Italy)". GCatholic.org. (for Chronology of Bishops) ^{[self-published]}

Catholic Church titles
Preceded by Fulgenzio Arminio Monforte	Bishop of Nusco; 1680–1702	Succeeded by Giacinto Dragonetti
