= Alessandro Gadaletta =

Roman Catholic bishop

Most Reverend Alessandro Gadaletta
- Bishop of Nusco
- Church: Catholic Church
- Diocese: Diocese of Nusco
- In office: 1563–1572
- Predecessor: Luigi Cavalcanti
- Successor: Pietro Persio

Personal details
- Died: 1572 Nusco, Italy

Alessandro Gadaletta (died 1572) was a Roman Catholic prelate who served as Bishop of Nusco (1563–1572).

== Biography ==
On 30 Jan 1563, Alessandro Gadaletta was appointed by Pope Pius IV as Bishop of Nusco. He served as Bishop of Nusco until his death in 1572. While bishop, he was the principal consecrator of Lelio Giordano, Bishop of Acerno.

== External links and additional sources ==
- Cheney, David M. "Diocese of Nusco". Catholic-Hierarchy.org. (for Chronology of Bishops) ^{[self-published]}
- Chow, Gabriel. "Diocese of Nusco (Italy)". GCatholic.org. (for Chronology of Bishops) ^{[self-published]}

Catholic Church titles
Preceded by Luigi Cavalcanti	Bishop of Nusco; 1563–1572	Succeeded by Pietro Persio
