= Diocese of Zé Doca =

Catholic ecclesiastical territory

Diocese of Zé Doca Dioecesis Zedocanus

Catholic

Location
- Country: Brazil
- Ecclesiastical province: São Luís do Maranhão

Statistics
- Area: 40,000 km^{2} (15,000 sq mi)
- Population: Total; Catholics: (as of 2004); 284,932; 260,000 (91.2%)

Information
- Rite: Latin Rite
- Established: 16 October 1961 (65 years ago)
- Cathedral: Catedral Santo Antônio de Pádua

Current leadership
- Pope: Leo XIV
- Bishop: João Kot, O.M.I.
- Metropolitan Archbishop: Gilberto Pastana de Oliveira
- Bishops emeritus: Carlo Ellena

The Roman Catholic Diocese of Zé Doca (Latin: Dioecesis Zedocanus) is a diocese located in the city of Zé Doca in the ecclesiastical province of São Luís do Maranhão in Brazil. Until 1991, it was known as the Diocese of Cândido Mendes.

== History ==
- 16 October 1961: Established as Territorial Prelature of Cândido Mendes from the Territorial Prelature of Pinheiro
- 13 October 1983: Promoted as Diocese of Cândido Mendes
- 5 July 1991: Renamed as Diocese of Zé Doca

== Bishops ==
- Bishops of Zé Doca (Roman rite), below
  - Bishop Jan Kot (2014.07.23-present)
  - Bishop Carlo Ellena (2004.02.18 – 2014.07.23)
  - Bishop Walmir Alberto Valle, I.M.C. (1985.11.05 – 2002.11.06), diocese renamed 1991.07.05; appointed Coadjutor Bishop of Joaçaba, Santa Catarina
- Bishop of Cândido Mendes (Roman Rite), below
  - Bishop Guido Maria Casullo (1983.10.13 – 1985.11.05)
- Prelate of Cândido Mendes (Roman Rite), below
  - Bishop Guido Maria Casullo (1965.12.20 – 1983.10.13)
