= Benedetto Rocci =

Bishop of nusco (1658–1661)

Most Reverend Benedetto Rocci
- Bishop of Nusco
- Church: Catholic Church
- Diocese: Diocese of Nusco
- Predecessor: Pietro Paolo Russo
- Successor: Angelo Picchetti

Orders
- Ordination: 4 September 1615
- Consecration: 26 May 1658 by Benedetto Odescalchi

Personal details
- Died: October 1661 Nusco, Italy

Benedetto Rocci, O. Carm. (died 1661) was a Roman Catholic prelate who served as Bishop of Nusco (1658–1661).

== Biography ==
Benedetto Rocci was ordained a priest in the Order of Our Lady of Mount Carmel on 4 September 1615. On 6 May 1658, he was appointed during the papacy of Pope Alexander VII as Bishop of Nusco. On 26 May 1658, he was consecrated bishop by Benedetto Odescalchi, Cardinal-Deacon of Santi Cosma e Damiano. He served as Bishop of Nusco until his death in October 1661.

== External links and additional sources ==
- Cheney, David M. "Diocese of Nusco". Catholic-Hierarchy.org. (for Chronology of Bishops) ^{[self-published]}
- Chow, Gabriel. "Diocese of Nusco (Italy)". GCatholic.org. (for Chronology of Bishops) ^{[self-published]}

Catholic Church titles
Preceded by Pietro Paolo Russo	Bishop of Nusco; 1658–1661	Succeeded by Angelo Picchetti
