= Guido Maria Casullo =

His Excellency, The Most Reverend Guido Maria Casullo
- Bishop of Cândido Mendes
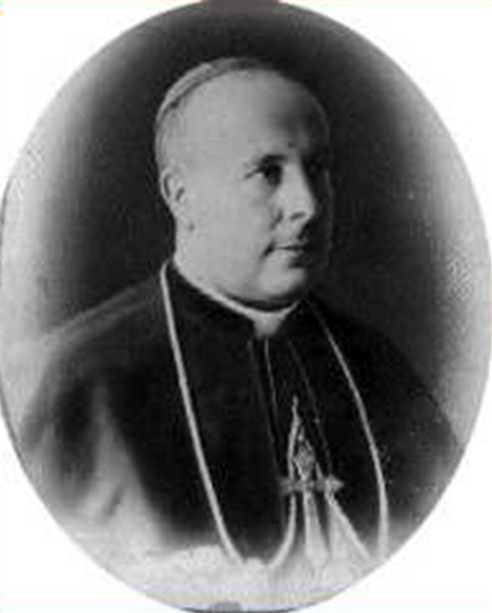
- Bishop Guido Maria Casullo
- Church: Catholic Church
- Diocese: Diocese of Cândido Mendes
- In office: October 13, 1983–November 5, 1985
- Previous posts: Prelate of Cândido Mendes (1965–1983); Auxiliary Bishop of Pinheiro (1963–1965); Bishop of Nusco (1951–1963)

Personal details
- Born: May 27, 1909 Monteleone di Puglia, Apulia, Italy
- Died: January 10, 2004 (aged 94) Fortaleza, Brazil
- Buried: St. Joseph's Cathedral, Fortaleza
- Motto: "Omni spes vitae" transl. For all the hope of life

Ordination history
History
Episcopal consecration
- Principal consecrator: Agostino Mancinelli
- Co-consecrators: Gioacchino Pedicini, Pasquale Venezia
- Place: Ariano Irpino Cathedral

Guido Maria Casullo (May 27, 1909 – January 10, 2004) was a Catholic prelate who was a bishop in both Italy and Brazil.

== Biography ==
Guido Maria Casullo was born on May 27, 1909, in Monteleone di Puglia, then a municipality in the Province of Avellino, but nowadays in the Apulian Province of Foggia. He was baptized on June 2 of that year. On November 4, 1920, he entered the Diocesan Seminary of Ariano di Puglia (now Ariano Irpino) and was ordained a deacon on January 6, 1932. He was then ordained a priest on July 16, 1932.

On May 27, 1951, Casullo was appointed the Bishop of Nusco and was ordained to the episcopate on July 15, 1951, in the Ariano Irpino Cathedral. Archbishop Agostino Mancinelli acted as principal consecrator, while Bishops Gioacchino Pedicini and Pasquale Venezia acted as co-consecrators. As a bishop, he took as his Latin episcopal motto "Omni spes vitae," which translates as "For all the hope of life."

Casullo served as a Conciliar Father in all four sessions of the Second Vatican Council, where he insisted on the role of missionary work. On February 11, 1963, given a choice between being assigned to Africa or Brazil, he was appointed as an auxiliary bishop in the Diocese of Pinheiro in Brazil. At the same time, he was appointed the Titular Bishop of Utica. Casullo left Italy for Brazil on May 12 of that year, stopping at the Sanctuary of Fátima in Portugal along the way, and arriving in Rio de Janeiro on May 17. Upon arriving, he began an intensive Portuguese language course. He finally arrived in Pinheiro on June 7, 1963.

On December 20, 1965, he was appointed the territorial prelate of the Prelature of Cândido Mendes. Casullo resigned as Titular Bishop of Utica on May 26, 1978. With the elevation of the Prelature of Cândido Mendes to a diocese, he was appointed the first Bishop of Cândido Mendes on October 13, 1983. Having reached the retirement age of 75, Casullo submitted his resignation to the Pope on November 5, 1985, and assumed emeritus status in the diocese. He had the choice of retiring to either Luanda, São Luiz, or Fortaleza and, upon the advice of the Cardinal Prefect for the Congregation of Bishops, chose Fortaleza, where he moved to the Montese neighborhood on August 19, 1986.

On January 10, 2004, Casullo died at the Hospital Gastroclínica in Fortaleza, Brazil, of a heart attack at the age of 94. A funeral was held on January 12, and he was buried in the crypt of the Fortaleza Cathedral.

Catholic Church titles
| Preceded by Pasquale Mores | Bishop of Nusco; 1951–1963 | Succeeded by Gastone Mojaisky-Perrelli |
| Preceded by – | Auxiliary Bishop of Pinheiro; 1963–1965 | Succeeded by – |
| Preceded by Oronzo Caldarola | — TITULAR — Bishop of Utica; 1963–1978 | Succeeded by Jean Yves Marie Sahuquet |
| New title Territorial prelature erected | Prelate of Cândido Mendes; 1965–1983 | Succeeded by Himself as Bishop of Cândido Mendes |
| Preceded by Himself as Prelate of Cândido Mendes | Bishop of Cândido Mendes; 1983–1985 | Succeeded by Walmir Alberto Valle |
