= Pietro Persio =

Italian Roman Catholic prelate

Most Reverend Pietro Persi
- Bishop of Nusco
- Church: Catholic Church
- Diocese: Diocese of Nusco
- In office: 1573–1578
- Predecessor: Alessandro Gadaletta
- Successor: Patrizio Lunato Laosio

Personal details
- Died: 1578 Nusco, Italy

Pietro Persio (died 1578) was a Roman Catholic prelate who served as Bishop of Nusco (1573–1578).

== Biography ==
On 23 Jan 1573, Pietro Persio was appointed by Pope Gregory XIII as Bishop of Nusco. He served as Bishop of Nusco until his death in 1578.

== External links and additional sources ==
- Cheney, David M. "Diocese of Nusco". Catholic-Hierarchy.org. (for Chronology of Bishops) ^{[self-published]}
- Chow, Gabriel. "Diocese of Nusco (Italy)". GCatholic.org. (for Chronology of Bishops) ^{[self-published]}

Catholic Church titles
Preceded by Alessandro Gadaletta	Bishop of Nusco; 1573–1578	Succeeded by Patrizio Lunato Laosio
