= Gerolamo Acciabianca =

Italian Roman Catholic prelate

Most Reverend Gerolamo Acciabianca
- Bishop of Nusco
- Church: Catholic Church
- Diocese: Diocese of Nusco
- In office: 1523–1537
- Predecessor: Marino Acciabianca
- Successor: Pietro Paolo Parisio

Personal details
- Died: 1537 Nusco, Italy

Gerolamo Acciabianca (died 1537) was a Roman Catholic prelate who served as Bishop of Nusco (1523–1537).

== Biography ==
On 17 June 1523, Gerolamo Acciabianca was appointed by Pope Adrian VI as Bishop of Nusco. He served as Bishop of Nusco until his death in 1537.

== See also ==
- Catholic Church in Italy

== External links and additional sources ==
- Cheney, David M. "Diocese of Nusco". Catholic-Hierarchy.org. (for Chronology of Bishops) ^{[self-published]}
- Chow, Gabriel. "Diocese of Nusco (Italy)". GCatholic.org. (for Chronology of Bishops) ^{[self-published]}

Catholic Church titles
Preceded by Marino Acciabianca	Bishop of Nusco; 1523–1537	Succeeded by Pietro Paolo Parisio
