= Marino Acciabianca =

Italian Roman Catholic prelate

Most Reverend Marino Acciabianca
- Bishop of Nusco
- Church: Catholic Church
- Diocese: Diocese of Nusco
- In office: 1514–1523
- Predecessor: Antonio Maramaldo
- Successor: Gerolamo Acciabianca

Personal details
- Died: 1523 Nusco, Italy

Marino Acciabianca (died 1523) was a Roman Catholic prelate who served as Bishop of Nusco (1514–1523).

== Biography ==
On 16 December 1513, Marino Acciabianca was appointed by Pope Leo X as Coadjutor Bishop of Nusco and succeeded to the bishopric in 1514. He served as Bishop of Nusco until his resignation in 1523.

== See also ==
- Catholic Church in Italy

== External links and additional sources ==
- Cheney, David M. "Diocese of Nusco". Catholic-Hierarchy.org. (for Chronology of Bishops) ^{[self-published]}
- Chow, Gabriel. "Diocese of Nusco (Italy)". GCatholic.org. (for Chronology of Bishops) ^{[self-published]}

Catholic Church titles
Preceded by Antonio Maramaldo	Bishop of Nusco; 1514–1523	Succeeded by Gerolamo Acciabianca
