= Giovanni Battista Zuccato =

Italian Roman Catholic prelate

Most Reverend Giovanni Battista Zuccato
- Bishop of Nusco
- Church: Catholic Church
- Diocese: Diocese of Nusco
- In office: 1607–1614
- Predecessor: Lazaro Pellizzari
- Successor: Michael Rezzi

Personal details
- Born: 1543 Milan, Italy
- Died: 14 April 1618 (aged 74–75) Nusco, Italy

Giovanni Battista Zuccato (1543 – 14 April 1618) was a Roman Catholic prelate who served as Bishop of Nusco (1607–1614).

== Biography ==
On 19 November 1607, Giovanni Battista Zuccato was appointed by Pope Paul V as Bishop of Nusco. He served as Bishop of Nusco until his resignation in 1614. He died on 14 April 1618.

== See also ==
- Catholic Church in Italy

== External links and additional sources ==
- Cheney, David M. "Diocese of Nusco". Catholic-Hierarchy.org. (for Chronology of Bishops) ^{[self-published]}
- Chow, Gabriel. "Diocese of Nusco (Italy)". GCatholic.org. (for Chronology of Bishops) ^{[self-published]}

Catholic Church titles
Preceded by Lazaro Pellizzari	Bishop of Nusco; 1607–1614	Succeeded by Michael Rezzi
