= Francesco Arcudio =

Italian Roman Catholic prelate

Most Reverend Francesco Arcudio
- Bishop of Nusco
- Church: Catholic Church
- Diocese: Diocese of Nusco
- In office: 1639–1641
- Predecessor: Michael Rezzi
- Successor: Giovanni Mauro

Orders
- Consecration: 25 December 1639 by Alessandro Cesarini (iuniore)

Personal details
- Born: 1589 Soleto, Kingdom of Naples
- Died: 7 October 1641 (age 52) Nusco, Kingdom of Naples

Francesco Arcudio, C.R. (1589 – 7 October 1641) was a Roman Catholic prelate who served as Bishop of Nusco (1639–1641).

== Biography ==
Francesco Arcudio was born in Soleto, then part of the Kingdom of Naples, and ordained a priest in the Congregation of Clerics Regular of the Divine Providence. On 19 December 1639, he was appointed by Pope Urban VIII as Bishop of Nusco. On 25 December 1639, he was consecrated bishop by Alessandro Cesarini (iuniore), Cardinal-Deacon of Sant'Eustachio, with Marcantonio Bragadin (cardinal), Bishop of Vicenza, and Giovanni Battista Scanaroli, Titular Bishop of Sidon, serving as co-consecrators. He served as Bishop of Nusco until his death on 7 October 1641.

== See also ==
- Catholic Church in Italy

== External links and additional sources ==
- Cheney, David M. "Diocese of Nusco". Catholic-Hierarchy.org. (for Chronology of Bishops) ^{[self-published]}
- Chow, Gabriel. "Diocese of Nusco (Italy)". GCatholic.org. (for Chronology of Bishops) ^{[self-published]}

Catholic Church titles
Preceded by Michael Rezzi	Bishop of Nusco; 1639–1641	Succeeded by Giovanni Mauro
