= Angelo Picchetti =

Italian Roman Catholic prelate

Most Reverend Angelo Picchetti
- Church: Catholic Church
- Diocese: Diocese of Nusco
- In office: 1662–1668
- Predecessor: Benedetto Rocci
- Successor: Fulgenzio Arminio Monforte

Personal details
- Born: 1591 Monticelli, Italy
- Died: 28 September 1668 (age 77) Nusco, Italy

Angelo Picchetti (1591–1668) was a Roman Catholic prelate who served as Bishop of Nusco (1662–1668).

== Biography ==
Angelo Picchetti was born in Monticelli, (Note: Several places in Italy are or have been called Monticelli. One source reports that Picchetti owned a villa at Monte San Biagio (called Monticelli or Monte Celio in his time), and it is possible that that was also his birthplace.) Italy in 1591. On 16 January 1662, he was appointed during the papacy of Pope Alexander VII as Bishop of Nusco. He served as Bishop of Nusco until his death on 28 September 1668.

== External links and additional sources ==
- Cheney, David M. "Diocese of Nusco". Catholic-Hierarchy.org. (for Chronology of Bishops) ^{[self-published]}
- Chow, Gabriel. "Diocese of Nusco (Italy)". GCatholic.org. (for Chronology of Bishops) ^{[self-published]}

Catholic Church titles
Preceded by Benedetto Rocci	Bishop of Nusco; 1662–1668	Succeeded by Fulgenzio Arminio Monforte
