= Giovannuccio Pasquali =

Roman Catholic prelate

Most Reverend Giovannuccio Pasquali
- Bishop of Nusco
- Church: Catholic Church
- Diocese: Diocese of Nusco
- In office: 1446–1471
- Successor: Stefano Moscatelli

Personal details
- Died: 1471 Nusco, Italy

Giovannuccio Pasquali (died 1471) was a Roman Catholic prelate who served as Bishop of Nusco (1446–1471).

== Biography ==
Giovannuccio Pasquali was ordained a priest in the Order of Friars Minor. In 1446, he was appointed by Pope Eugene IV as Bishop of Nusco. He served as Bishop of Nusco until his death in 1474.

== External links and additional sources ==
- Cheney, David M. "Diocese of Nusco". Catholic-Hierarchy.org. (for Chronology of Bishops) ^{[self-published]}
- Chow, Gabriel. "Diocese of Nusco (Italy)". GCatholic.org. (for Chronology of Bishops) ^{[self-published]}

Catholic Church titles
Preceded by	Bishop of Nusco; 1446–1471	Succeeded by Stefano Moscatelli
