= Antonio Maramaldo =

Italian Roman Catholic prelate

Most Reverend Antonio Maramaldo
- Bishop of Nusco
- Church: Catholic Church
- Diocese: Diocese of Nusco
- In office: 1485–1514
- Predecessor: Stefano Moscatelli
- Successor: Marino Acciabianca

Personal details
- Died: 1514 Nusco, Italy

Antonio Maramaldo (died 1514) was a Roman Catholic prelate who served as Bishop of Nusco (1485–1514).

On 21 November 1485, Antonio Maramaldo was appointed by Pope Innocent VIII as Bishop of Nusco. He served as Bishop of Nusco until his death in 1514.

== External links and additional sources ==
- Cheney, David M. "Diocese of Nusco". Catholic-Hierarchy.org. (for Chronology of Bishops) ^{[self-published]}
- Chow, Gabriel. "Diocese of Nusco (Italy)". GCatholic.org. (for Chronology of Bishops) ^{[self-published]}

Catholic Church titles
Preceded by Stefano Moscatelli	Bishop of Nusco; 1485–1514	Succeeded by Marino Acciabianca
