= Stefano Moscatelli =

Italian Roman Catholic prelate

Most Reverend Stefano Moscatelli
- Bishop of Nusco
- Church: Catholic Church
- Diocese: Diocese of Nusco
- In office: 1471–1485
- Predecessor: Giovannuccio Pasquali
- Successor: Antonio Maramaldo

Personal details
- Died: 1485 Nusco, Italy

Stefano Moscatelli (died 1485) was a Roman Catholic prelate who served as Bishop of Nusco (1471–1485).

== Biography ==
On 11 Oct 1471, Stefano Moscatelli was appointed by Pope Sixtus IV as Bishop of Nusco. He served as Bishop of Nusco until his death in 1485.

== External links and additional sources ==
- Cheney, David M. "Diocese of Nusco". Catholic-Hierarchy.org. (for Chronology of Bishops) ^{[self-published]}
- Chow, Gabriel. "Diocese of Nusco (Italy)". GCatholic.org. (for Chronology of Bishops) ^{[self-published]}

Catholic Church titles
| Preceded by Giovannuccio Pasquali | Bishop of Nusco; 1471–1485 | Succeeded by Antonio Maramaldo |
