= Pietro Paolo Russo =

Italian Roman Catholic prelate

Most Reverend Pietro Paolo Russo
- Bishop of Nusco
- Church: Catholic Church
- Diocese: Diocese of Nusco
- In office: 1649–1657
- Predecessor: Aniello Campagna
- Successor: Benedetto Rocci

Orders
- Consecration: 7 March 1649 by Bernardino Spada

Personal details
- Born: 1611 Santomenna, Italy
- Died: May 1657 (aged 45–46) Nusco, Italy

Pietro Paolo Russo (1611–1657) was a Roman Catholic prelate who served as Bishop of Nusco (1649–1657).

== Biography ==
Pietro Paolo Russo was born in Santomenna, Italy in 1611. On 1 March 1649, he was appointed during the papacy of Pope Innocent X as Bishop of Nusco. On 7 March 1649, he was consecrated bishop by Bernardino Spada, Cardinal-Priest of San Pietro in Vincoli, with Sallustio Pecólo, Bishop Emeritus of Venosa, and Donato Pascasio, Bishop of Trevico, serving as co-consecrators. He served as Bishop of Nusco until his death in May 1657.

== External links and additional sources ==
- Cheney, David M. "Diocese of Nusco". Catholic-Hierarchy.org. (for Chronology of Bishops) ^{[self-published]}
- Chow, Gabriel. "Diocese of Nusco (Italy)". GCatholic.org. (for Chronology of Bishops) ^{[self-published]}

Catholic Church titles
Preceded by Aniello Campagna	Bishop of Nusco; 1649–1657	Succeeded by Benedetto Rocci
