= Patrizio Lunato Laosio =

Italian Roman Catholic prelate

Most Reverend Patrizio Lunato Laosio
- Bishop of Nusco
- Church: Catholic Church
- Diocese: Diocese of Nusco
- In office: 1578–1602
- Predecessor: Pietro Persio
- Successor: Lazaro Pellizzari

Personal details
- Died: 22 April 1602 Nusco, Italy

Patrizio Lunato Laosio (died 22 April 1602) was a Roman Catholic prelate who served as Bishop of Nusco (1578–1602).

== Biography ==
On 15 Oct 1578, Patrizio Lunato Laosio was appointed by Pope Gregory XIII as Bishop of Nusco. He served as Bishop of Nusco until his death on 22 April 1602.

== External links and additional sources ==
- Cheney, David M. "Diocese of Nusco". Catholic-Hierarchy.org. (for Chronology of Bishops) ^{[self-published]}
- Chow, Gabriel. "Diocese of Nusco (Italy)". GCatholic.org. (for Chronology of Bishops) ^{[self-published]}

Catholic Church titles
Preceded by Pietro Persio	Bishop of Nusco; 1578–1602	Succeeded by Lazaro Pellizzari
