= Cristoforo Domenico Carullo =

Italian Catholic prelate (1889–1968)

His Excellency, The Most Reverend Cristoforo Domenico Carullo O.F.M.
- Archbishop of Conza-Sant'Angelo dei Lombardi-Bisaccia
- Church: Catholic Church
- In office: 1946–1968
- Other post: Bishop of Lacedonia (1940–1968)

Orders
- Ordination: 26 July 1914
- Consecration: 28 April 1940

Personal details
- Born: 7 August 1889 Stefanaconi, Calabria, Italy
- Died: 31 January 1968 (aged 78)

Cristoforo Domenico Carullo, O.F.M. (7 August 1889 – 31 January 1968) was an Italian Catholic prelate and a Franciscan friar. He served as the Bishop of Lacedonia from 1940 to 1968 and as the Archbishop of Conza-Sant'Angelo dei Lombardi-Bisaccia from 1946 to 1968.

== Biography ==
Carullo was born on 7 August 1889 in Stefanaconi in Calabria, Italy. He was ordained a priest on 26 July 1914 in the Order of Friars Minor and appointed Bishop of Lacedonia ad personam on 2 February 1940, being ordained on 28 April 1940 and succeeding Giulio Tommasi. Archbishop Enrico Montalbetti acted as principal consecrator, while Bishops Felice Cribellati and Demetrio Moscato acted as co-consecrators. He held the position until 1968.

On 15 September 1946, he was appointed the Archbishop of Conza-Sant'Angelo dei Lombardi-Bisaccia and held this title coextensively with his title of Lacedonia until his death. Carullo died on 31 January 1968.

Catholic Church titles
Preceded by Giulio Tommasi	Bishop of Lacedonia; 1940–1968	Succeeded by Agapito Simeoni
Preceded by Antonio Melomo	Archbishop of Conza-Sant'Angelo dei Lombardi-Bisaccia; 1946–1968	Succeeded by Gastone Mojaisky-Perrelli
