= Roman Catholic Diocese of Nusco =

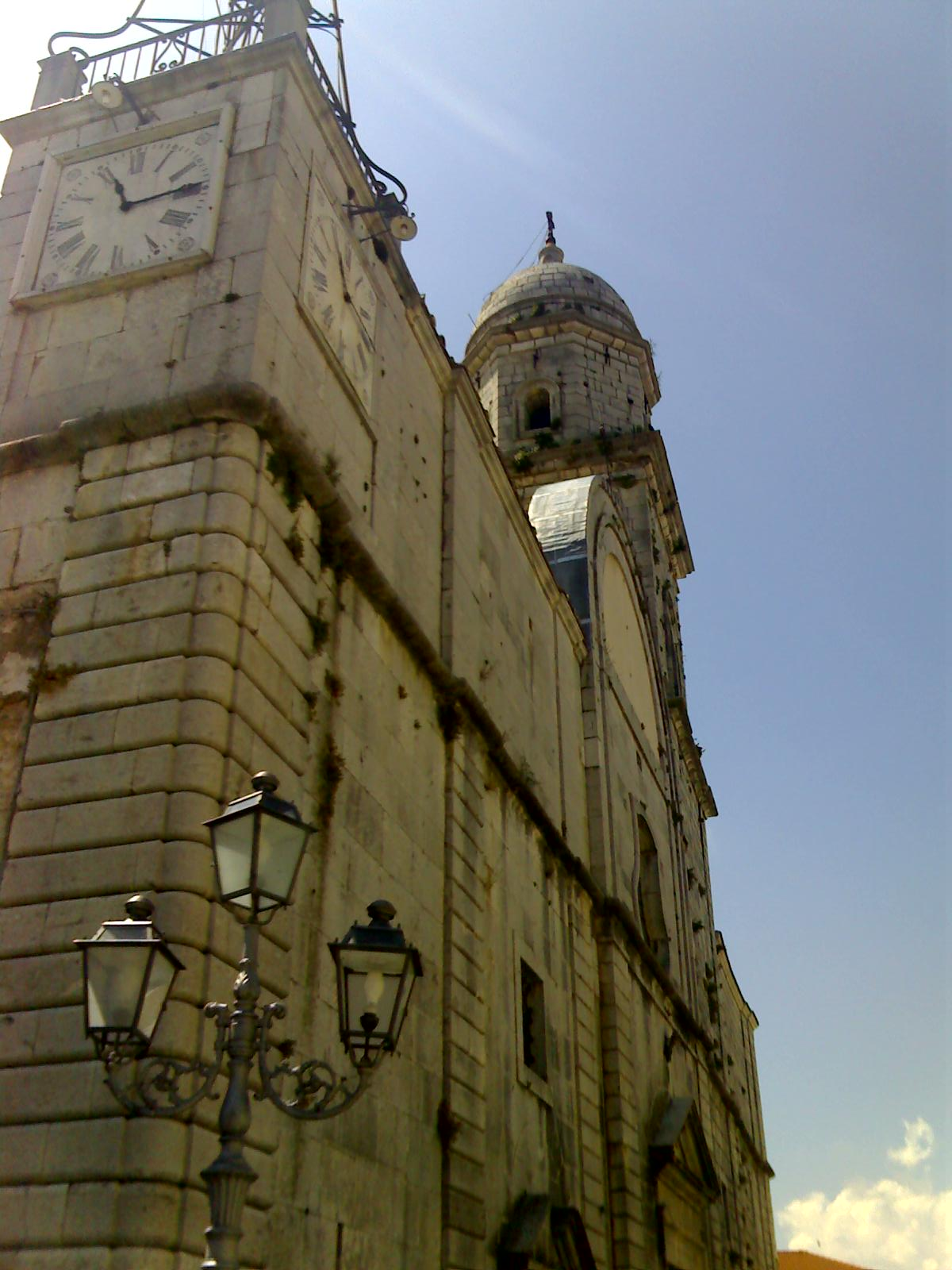
Cathedral in Nusco

Diocese of Nusco was a Roman Catholic ecclesiastical territory in Campania, southern Italy, and was a suffragan of the archdiocese of Salerno. In 1986 the diocese was suppressed, and its territory was united with the archdiocese of Conza-Sant'Angelo dei Lombardi-Bisaccia, to form the Archdiocese of Conza-Sant'Angelo dei Lombardi-Nusco-Bisaccia.

== History ==
Nusco is in the Italian civil province of Avellino. The town is 22.08 mi (35.54 km) from Salerno in a direct line, but 44.3 mi (71.3 km) by land transportation, which takes one hour and ten minutes. In 1753, the town had a population estimated at 1,100 persons. In 2017, there were 4,148 inhabitants. In 1980, the entire diocese had a population of 32,775.

The diocese of Nusco dates from the eleventh century.

The cathedral of Nusco was originally dedicated in honor of S. Stephen the Protomartyr, but as its bishop Amatus came to be honored as a saint, the title of the cathedral was changed to S. Amatus. The cathedral was administered by a Chapter, composed of four dignities (the Archdeacon, the Archpriest, the Primicerius Major, and the Primicerius Minor) and six canons. In 1614, there were four dignities and eight canons.

The diocese of Nusco was a suffragan of the archdiocese of Salerno.

=== Concordat of 1818 ===
Following the extinction of the Napoleonic Kingdom of Italy, the Congress of Vienna authorized the restoration of the Papal States and the Kingdom of Naples. Since the French occupation had seen the abolition of many Church institutions in the Kingdom, as well as the confiscation of most Church property and resources, it was imperative that Pope Pius VII and King Ferdinand IV reach agreement on restoration and restitution. Ferdinand, however, was not prepared to accept the pre-Napoleonic situation, in which Naples was a feudal subject of the papacy. Lengthy, detailed, and acrimonious negotiations ensued.

In 1818, a new concordat with the Kingdom of the Two Sicilies committed the pope to the suppression of more than fifty small dioceses in the kingdom. On 27 June 1818, in the bull "De Utiliori", Pope Pius VII restored the ecclesiastical provinces in the Kingdom of Naples, and reorganized the suffragans. The archdiocese of Salerno was assigned as its suffragans the dioceses of Capaccio, Policastro, Marsico, and Nusco; the diocese of Acerno was given to the archbishop of Salerno in administratorship. In the case of Nusco, the diocese of Montemarano was completely suppressed, and its territory and town incorporated into the diocese of Nusco.

=== Diocesan Reorganization ===
Following the Second Vatican Council, and in accordance with the norms laid out in the council's decree, Christus Dominus chapter 40, Pope Paul VI ordered a reorganization of the ecclesiastical provinces in southern Italy. Pope Paul VI ordered consultations among the members of the Congregation of Bishops in the Vatican Curia, the Italian Bishops Conference, and the various dioceses concerned. After twenty years, problems and objections were still apparent.

On 18 February 1984, the Vatican and the Italian State signed a new and revised concordat. Based on the revisions, a set of Normae was issued on 15 November 1984, which was accompanied in the next year, on 3 June 1985, by enabling legislation. According to the agreement, the practice of having one bishop govern two separate dioceses at the same time, aeque personaliter, was abolished. The Vatican continued consultations which had begun under Pope John XXIII for the merging of small dioceses, especially those with personnel and financial problems, into one combined diocese.

On 30 September 1986, Pope John Paul II ordered that the dioceses of Sant'Angelo dei Lombardi, Conza, Nusco, and Bisaccia be merged into one diocese with one bishop, with the Latin title Archidioecesis Sancti Angeli de Lombardis-Compsana-Nuscana-Bisaciensis. The seat of the diocese was to be in Sant'Angelo dei Lombardi, and the cathedral of Sant'Angelo dei Lombardi was to serve as the cathedral of the merged diocese. The cathedrals in Conza, Nusco, and Bisaccia were to become co-cathedrals, and their cathedral Chapters were each to be a Capitulum Concathedralis. There was to be only one diocesan Tribunal, in Sant'Angelo dei Lombardi, and likewise one seminary, one College of Consultors, and one Priests' Council. The territory of the new diocese was to include the territory of the suppressed dioceses of Conza, Nusco, and Bisaccia. The new archdiocese was to be a suffragan of the archdiocese of Benevento.

The first archbishop of the new archdiocese of Sant'Angelo dei Lombardi-Conza-Nusco-Bisaccia was Antonio Nuzzi, who had been Bishop of Nusco from 21 February 1981 to 30 September 1986.

== Bishops of Nusco ==
=== to 1600 ===
- Amatus of Nusco (1076-1093)
- Guido (1104)
- Rogerius (attested 1143–1147)
- Willelmus attested 1164, 1167)
- Rogerius (1198)

...

- Lucas (c. 1240?)
- Jacobus, O.Min. (by 1285).
- P[ - - - ]

...

- Rogerius Gesualdo (d. 1350)
- Franciscus (1350–1365)
- Arnaldus (1365–1374)
- Angelo Vitale (1375–1394) Roman Obedience
- Petrus, O.Min. (13 ?–1392) Avignon Obedience
- Marcus de Porres (1394–1396) Roman Obedience
- Angelo Barrili (1396–1400) Roman Obedience
- Bernardus (1400– ? )
- Guillelmus
- Antonius (1418–1435)
- Carluccio Paolucci (1435–1446)
- Giovannuccio Pasquali, O.F.M. (1446–1471)
- Stefano Moscatelli (11 October 1471 – 1485)
- Antonio Maramaldo (21 November 1485 – 1514)
- Marino Acciabianca (1514 – 1523 Resigned)
- Gerolamo Acciabianca (17 June 1523 – 1537)
- Pietro Paolo Parisio (11 January 1538 – 11 May 1545)
- Luigi Cavalcanti (1 June 1545 –1563)
- Alessandro Gadaletta (30 January 1563 – 1572)
- Pietro Persio (23 Jan 1573 – 1578)
- Patrizio Lavosio (1578–1602)

=== 1500 to 1800 ===
- Lazaro Pellizzari, O.P. (1602–1607)
- Giovanni Battista Zuccato (1607–1614 Resigned)
- Michael Rezzi (Resti) (1614–1639)
- Francesco Arcudio (1639–1641)
- Giovanni Mauro, O.F.M. Conv. (13 Jan 1642 – 1 November 1644)
- Aniello Campagna (6 Mar 1645 – Jan 1648)
- Pietro Paolo Russo (1 Mar 1649 – May 1657)
- Benedetto Rocci, O. Carm. (6 May 1658 – October 1661)
- Angelo Picchetti (16 January 1662 – 28 September 1668)
- Fulgenzio Arminio Monforte, O.S.A. (1669–1680 Resigned)
- Benedetto Giacinto Sangermano (1680–1702)
- Giacinto Dragonetti, C.O. (5 Mar 1703 –1724)
- Nicolò Tupputi (1724–1740)
- Gaetano d’Arco (6 March 1741 – 25 May 1753 Died)
- Francesco Antonio Bonaventura (26 November 1753 – 15 June 1788)
- Francesco Saverio de Vivo (27 February 1792 Confirmed – 1797)

=== 1800 to 1986 ===
Matteo Aceto (1818–1819)

- Pasquale de Nicolais (1820–1835)
- Francesco-Paolo Mastropasqua (1837–1848)
- Giuseppe Autelitano (1849–1854)
- Michele Adinolfi (1854–1860)
- Gaetano Stiscia (23 March 1860 – 24 April 1870 Died)
- Giovanni Acquaviva, C.O. (22 December 1871 – 26 January 1893 Died)
- Giuseppe Consenti, C.SS.R. (26 January 1893 –1893)
- Emilio Alfonso Todisco Grande (12 June 1893 – August 1896 Died)
- Michele Arcangelo Pirone (30 November 1896 – 6 February 1909 Died)
- Angelo Giacinto Scapardini, O.P. (29 April 1909 – 10 September 1910)
- Luigi Paulini (11 September 1911 – 10 March 1919 Appointed, Bishop of Concordia)
- Pasquale Mores (15 December 1919 – 31 January 1950 Retired)
- Guido Maria Casullo (29 May 1951 –1963)
- Gastone Mojaisky-Perrelli (10 May 1963 – 18 November 1978 Resigned)
- Mario Miglietta (18 November 1978 –1981)
- Antonio Nuzzi (21 February 1981 –1986)

== See also ==
- Roman Catholic Archdiocese of Sant'Angelo dei Lombardi-Conza-Nusco-Bisaccia
- List of Catholic dioceses in Italy

== Books ==
- Eubel, Conradus (1890), "Die Bischöfe, Cardinale und Päpste aus dem Minoritenorden," (in German), in: Römische Quartalschrift für Christliche Altertumskunde 4 (1890), pp. 185–258.
- Eubel, Conradus, ed. (1913). Hierarchia catholica (in Latin). Vol. Tomus 1 (second ed.). Münster: Libreria Regensbergiana.
- Eubel, Conradus, ed. (1914). Hierarchia catholica (in Latin). Vol. Tomus 2 (second ed.). Münster: Libreria Regensbergiana.
- Eubel, Conradus; Gulik, Guilelmus (1923). Hierarchia catholica (in Latin). Vol. 3 (second ed.). Münster: Libreria Regensbergiana.
- Gams, Pius Bonifatius (1873). Series episcoporum Ecclesiae catholicae: quotquot innotuerunt a beato Petro apostolo (in Latin). Ratisbon: Typis et Sumptibus Georgii Josephi Manz. pp. 908–909.
- Gauchat, Patritius (Patrice) (1935). Hierarchia catholica (in Latin). Vol. IV (1592-1667). Münster: Libraria Regensbergiana.
- Ritzler, Remigius; Sefrin, Pirminus (1952). Hierarchia catholica medii et recentis aevi (in Latin). Vol. V (1667-1730). Patavii: Messagero di S. Antonio.
- Ritzler, Remigius; Sefrin, Pirminus (1958). Hierarchia catholica medii et recentis aevi (in Latin). Vol. VI (1730-1799). Patavii: Messagero di S. Antonio.
- Ritzler, Remigius; Sefrin, Pirminus (1968). Hierarchia Catholica medii et recentioris aevi (in Latin). Vol. VII (1800–1846). Monasterii: Libr. Regensburgiana.
- Ritzler, Remigius; Pirminus Sefrin (1978). Hierarchia catholica Medii et recentioris aevi (in Latin). Vol. VIII (1846–1903). Il Messaggero di S. Antonio.
- Pięta, Zenon (2002). Hierarchia catholica medii et recentioris aevi (in Latin). Vol. IX: 1903–1922. Padua: Messagero di San Antonio. ISBN 978-88-250-1000-8.

=== Studies ===
- Cappelletti, Giuseppe (1870). Le chiese d'Italia: dalla loro origine sino ai nostri giorni (in Italian). Vol. vigesimo (20). Venezia: G. Antonelli. pp. 401–407, 412–414.
- Cuozzo, E. (1979), "Amato di Montecassino e Amato di Nusco: una stessa persona?" (in Italian). Benedictina 26 (1979), pp. 323–348.
- D'Avino, Vincenzio (1848). Cenni storici sulle chiese arcivescovili, vescovili, e prelatizie (nullius) del regno delle due Sicilie (in Italian). Naples: dalle stampe di Ranucci. pp. 491–499. [article written by Giuseppe Paesano].
- Kehr, Paul Fridolin (1935). Italia pontificia. Vol. VIII: Regnum Normannorum — Campania. Berlin: Weidmann. (in Latin) pp. 377–378.
- Mattei-Cerasoli, Leone (1919). "Da archivii e biblioteche: Di alcuni vescovi poco noti". (in Italian). In: Archivio storico per le province Neapolitane 44 (Napoli: Luigi Lubrano 1919). pp. 310–335.
- Torelli, Felice (1848). La chiave del Concordato dell'anno 1818 e degli atti emanati posteriormente al medesimo. (in Italian) Volume 1, second edition Naples: Stamperia del Fibreno, 1848.
- Ughelli, Ferdinando; Coleti, NIccolo (1721). Italia sacra sive De episcopis Italiæ, et insularum adjacentium (in Latin). Vol. Tomus septimus (7). Venice: apud Sebastianum Coleti. pp. 532–541.
