= Mario Miglietta =

Italian Catholic archbishop

His Excellency, The Most Reverend Mario Miglietta
- Archbishop-Bishop of Ugento-Santa Maria di Leuca
- In office: 21 February 1981–14 November 1992
- Predecessor: Gastone Mojaisky Perrelli
- Successor: Antonio Nuzzi
- Previous posts: Archbishop of Conza-Sant'Angelo dei Lombardi-Bisaccia (1978–1981); Bishop of Nusco (1978–1981)

Personal details
- Born: 25 January 1925 Leverano, Apulia, Italy
- Died: 17 January 1996 (aged 70) Albano Laziale, Rome, Italy
- Buried: Santa Maria di Leuca, Apulia
- Denomination: Roman Catholic
- Education: Pontifical Lateran University

Ordination history of Mario Miglietta
History
Priestly ordination
- Ordained by: Francesco De Filippis
Episcopal consecration
- Principal consecrator: Corrado Ursi
- Co-consecrators: Giuseppe Caprio, Aldo Garzia
- Place: Molfetta Cathedral, Province of Bari, Apulia, Italy

Mario Miglietta (25 January 1925 – 17 January 1996) was an Italian Catholic archbishop.

Miglietta served as the Bishop of Nusco, as Archbishop of Conza-Sant'Angelo dei Lombardi-Bisaccia, and then as Archbishop-Bishop of Ugento-Santa Maria di Leuca.

== Biography ==
Miglietta was born on 25 January 1925 in Leverano, a comune in Apulia, southern Italy. His father was from the town of Trepuzzi, on the Salento peninsula, where Mario Miglietta spent his holidays. Giuseppe Miglietta, the uncle of Mario and his father's brother, was the archpriest of Leverano and was an influence on Mario's decision to enter the priesthood. As a boy, he entered the minor diocesan seminary and eventually completed his theological studies.

=== Priestly ministry ===
Miglietta was ordained a priest by Archbishop Francesco De Filippis and incardinated in the Archdiocese of Brindisi-Ostuni on 10 August 1947. He was named to the position of vice-rector of the Pius XI Pontifical Regional Seminary of Puglia in Molfetta in 1947. On 25 October 1949, he was made prefect of philosophical studies and a professor of religion in the seminary. From 1951 to 1952, he lived in Rome to study at the Pontifical Lateran University, where he earned a degree in dogmatic theology. In October 1953, he was made vice-rector of theological studies of the Puglia seminary and a professor homiletics. From 1 October 1965 to December 1968, he served as pro-rector and from December 1968 to February 1979, he held the position of rector. He was known to repeat "If they knock on the walls of the Molfetta seminary, the walls will reply 'Don Mario!'."

=== Episcopal ministry ===
In 1978, Miglietta was appointed Bishop of Nusco. He was consecrated a bishop in the Molfetta Cathedral on 14 January 1979 by Cardinal Corrado Ursi with Cardinal Giuseppe Caprio and Bishop Aldo Garzia as co-consecrators. He held this position until 1981.

Miglietta would recount that on the day he was to be appointed Archbishop of Conza-Sant'Angelo dei Lombardi-Bisaccia, Pope Paul VI died. Therefore, his appointment had to be postponed until the election of Pope John Paul I, who was then unable to sign the appointment due to his sudden death. Finally, on 18 November 1978, Pope John Paul II appointed him to the archbishopric. Shortly after being made archbishop, Miglietta suffered a heart attack, which was followed by the devastating Irpinia earthquake of 1980. His time as archbishop involved ministering to the victims of the earthquake.

Cardinal Sebastiano Baggio, then Prefect of the Congregation for Bishops, proposed that he be transferred to the Diocese of Ugento-Santa Maria di Leuca. He was eventually appointed Archbishop-Bishop of Ugento-Santa Maria di Leuca in 1981 (archbishop being conferred as a personal title), a position he held until 14 November 1992 when he resigned for health reasons. While Archbishop-Bishop of Ugento-Santa Maria di Leuca, one of the priests from his diocese, Fr. Antonio Bello, was appointed Bishop of Molfetta-Ruvo-Giovinazzo-Terlizzi.

Miglietta died on 17 January 1996 after an emergency hospitalization in the Regina Apostolorum hospital in Albano Laziale. It was his desire to be buried in the Basilica of Santa Maria di Leuca. After his funeral mass was celebrated in Ugento on 19 January, he was buried in a cemetery in Levarano. His body remained there for 13 years until Vito De Grisantis, the Bishop of Ugento-Santa Maria di Leuca, presided over the rite of transfer of the body and had it exhumed and buried beneath the altar of St. Francis of Paola in the Basilica of Leuca, in accordance with Miglietta's wishes.

Academic offices
| Preceded by Giuseppe Carata | Rector of the Pius XI Pontifical Regional Seminary of Puglia; 1968–1979 | Succeeded by Tommaso Tridente |
Catholic Church titles
| Preceded by Gastone Mojaisky Perrelli | Bishop of Nusco; 1978–1981 | Succeeded by Antonio Nuzzi |
| Preceded by Gastone Mojaisky Perrelli | Archbishop of Conza-Sant'Angelo dei Lombardi-Bisaccia; 1978–1981 | Succeeded by Antonio Nuzzi |
| Preceded by Michele Mincuzzi | Archbishop-Bishop of Ugento-Santa Maria di Leuca; 1981–1992 | Succeeded by Domenico Caliandro |
