= Luigi Maglione =

Italian cardinal (1877-1944)

His Eminence Luigi Maglione
- Cardinal-Priest of Santa Pudenziana
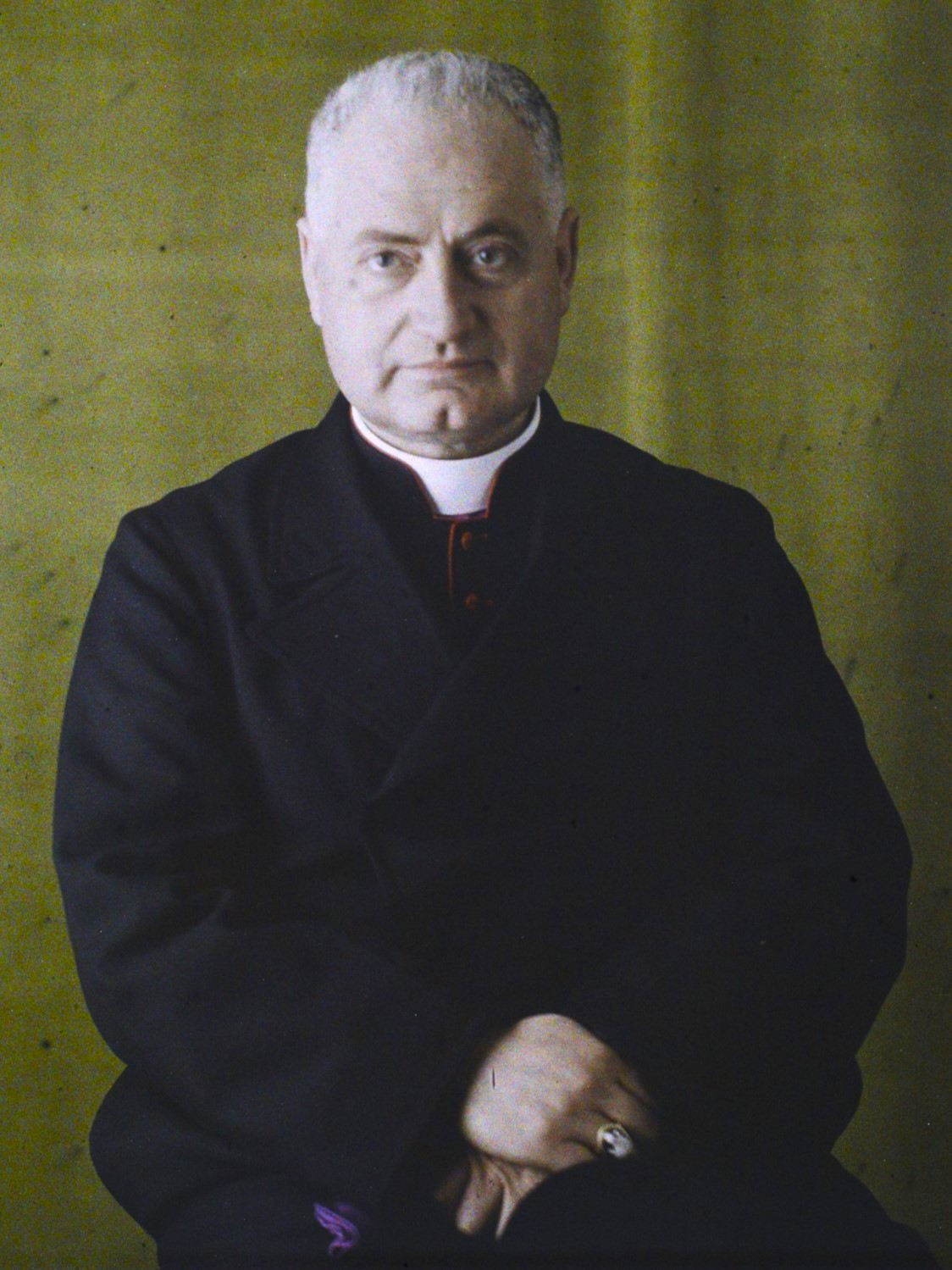
- Portrait by Georges Chevalier, 1927
- Appointed: 18 June 1936
- Term ended: 22 August 1944
- Predecessor: Francis Alphonsus Bourne
- Successor: Jules-Géraud Saliège
- Other post: Cardinal Secretary of State (1939–1944)
- Previous posts: Apostolic Nuncio to Switzerland (1920–1926); Titular Archbishop of Caesarea in Palestina (1920–1935); Apostolic Nuncio to France (1926–1935); Prefect of the Sacred Congregation for Extraordinary Ecclesiastical Affairs (1939–1944)

Orders
- Ordination: 25 July 1901
- Consecration: 26 September 1920 by Pietro Gasparri
- Created cardinal: 16 December 1935 by Pope Pius XI
- Rank: Cardinal-Priest

Personal details
- Born: Luigi Maglione; 2 March 1877 Casoria, Kingdom of Italy
- Died: 22 August 1944 (aged 67) Casoria, Italy
- Denomination: Roman Catholic
- Motto: Fides et labor (Faith and work)
- Coat of arms

Styles of Luigi Maglione
- Reference style: His Eminence
- Spoken style: Your Eminence
- Informal style: Cardinal
- See: None

Luigi Maglione (Italian pronunciation: [luˈidʒi maʎˈʎone]; 2 March 1877 – 22 August 1944) was an Italian prelate of the Catholic Church who joined the diplomatic service of the Holy See in 1908 and served as a papal nuncio from 1920 to 1935. After a few years working in the Roman Curia, he was Secretary of State from 1939 until his death in 1944. He became an archbishop in 1920 and a cardinal in 1935.

== Early career and education ==
Born in Casoria, Maglione was educated at the Almo Collegio Capranica and Pontifical Gregorian University, from where he obtained doctorates in philosophy and theology, in Rome. He was ordained a priest on 25 July 1901, and then did pastoral work in the Archdiocese of Naples until 1903.

Maglione studied at the Pontifical Ecclesiastical Academy from 1905 to 1907; he later taught there from 1915 to 1918. He served an official of the Vatican Secretariat of State from 1908 to 1918, rising to become a Privy Chamberlain (17 June 1910) and a Domestic Prelate (22 February 1918). He was also a provisional papal representative to the League of Nations and a special papal envoy to Switzerland.

== Nunciatures ==
On 1 September 1920, Maglione was appointed Nuncio to Switzerland and Titular Archbishop of Cesarea di Palestina by Pope Benedict XV. He received his episcopal consecration on the following 26 September from Cardinal Pietro Gasparri, with Archbishops Bonaventura Cerretti and Lorenzo Schioppa serving as co-consecrators, in the church of Santa Maria in Trastevere. Maglione was named Apostolic Nuncio to France on 23 June 1926. In France he was initially considered pro-German, but became so trusted by the French Government that he was reported to have had a hand in the Hoare-Laval Pact during the Italo-Ethiopian War. During his nunciature in France, on 25 July 1930, Maglione ordained Yves Congar to the priesthood.

== Cardinal Secretary of State ==
Pope Pius XI created Maglione Cardinal-Priest of Santa Pudenziana in the consistory of 16 December 1935, and then prefect of the Sacred Congregation of the Council on 22 July 1938. Maglione was one of the cardinal electors who participated in the 1939 papal conclave, which selected Pope Pius XII. Pius XII, who was a former schoolmate of Maglione's, tapped Maglione to succeed him as Vatican Secretary of State on 10 March 1939.

His tenure as secretary of state included most of World War II and the Holocaust, much of his work being documented in the eleven volumes of the Holy See's wartime documents, Actes et documents du Saint Siège relatifs à la Seconde Guerre Mondiale. After falling under Nazi occupation, Lithuania appealed to the Vatican to reintegrate its dioceses into the country and replace its bishops, to which Maglione responded, "The government of Kaunas should appreciate, that the Holy See cannot run behind armies and change bishops as combatant troops occupy new territories belonging to countries other than their own."

The relationship between Maglione and the pontiff was so close that Italians were known to joke that whenever Pius XII went out without his maglione (Italian for "sweater"), he caught cold. Maglione vigorously defended Pius XII's wartime diplomacy, once declaring:

"If you ask why the documents sent by the Pontiff to the Polish bishops have not been made public, know that it seems better in the Vatican to follow the same norms, the Polish bishops themselves follow...Isn’t this what has to be done? Should the father of Christianity increase the misfortunes of Poles in their own country?"

Maglione died a year before the war's end in Casoria from neuritis and circulatory ailments. Upon his death, Pius XII assumed the duties of the office himself, with assistance from Domenico Tardini and Giovanni Battista Montini (who later became Pope Paul VI).

Catholic Church titles
Preceded by Bonaventura Cerretti	Apostolic Nuncio to France; 23 June 1926 – 22 July 1938	Succeeded by Valerio Valeri
Preceded by Eugenio Pacelli	Cardinal Secretary of State; 10 March 1939 – 22 August 1944	Vacant Title next held by Domenico Tardini
