= Carmelo Cassati =

Italian prelate of the Catholic Church

Carmelo Cassati, M.S.C.
- Bishop of the Archdiocese of Trani-Barletta-Bisceglie (emeritus)
- Church: Roman Catholic Church
- See: Roman Catholic Archdiocese of Trani-Barletta-Bisceglie
- In office: 1990–1999
- Predecessor: Giuseppe Carata
- Successor: Giovanni Battista Pichierri
- Previous post: Prelate

Orders
- Ordination: 17 December 1949

Personal details
- Born: 6 April 1924 Eufemia-Tricase, Italy
- Died: 3 February 2017 (aged 92) Tricase, Italy

Carmelo Cassati (6 April 1924 – 3 February 2017) was an Italian prelate of the Catholic Church.

Cassati was born in Tricase and ordained a priest on 17 December 1949 from the religious order of the Missionaries of the Sacred Heart. In 1950, he was sent as a Missionary to Brazil and then, in 1951, to Peru. The Apostolic Nuncio of Peru, Giovanni Panico, appointed him his secretary.

Cassati was appointed auxiliary bishop of the Diocese of Pinheiro, as well as titular bishop of Nova Germania, on 27 April 1970 and ordained on 28 June 1970. Cassati was appointed bishop of Pinheiro diocese on 17 June 1975. Cassati resigned from the Titular see of Nova Germania in 1978, followed by an appointment to Diocese of Tricarico on 12 February 1979. Cassati was appointed bishop of the Diocese of Lucera and Diocese of San Severo on 7 September 1985, resigning from Lucera on 30 September 1986. Cassati's final appointment was to the Archdiocese of Trani-Barletta-Bisceglie on 15 December 1990. Cassati remained with the diocese until his retirement on 13 November 1999. Cassati had lived in Eufemia-Tricase until his death at the age of 92.8 years.
