= Domenico Tardini =

Italian cardinal (1888-1961)

His Eminence Domenico Tardini
- Cardinal-Deacon of Sant'Apollinare alle Terme Neroniane-Alessandrine
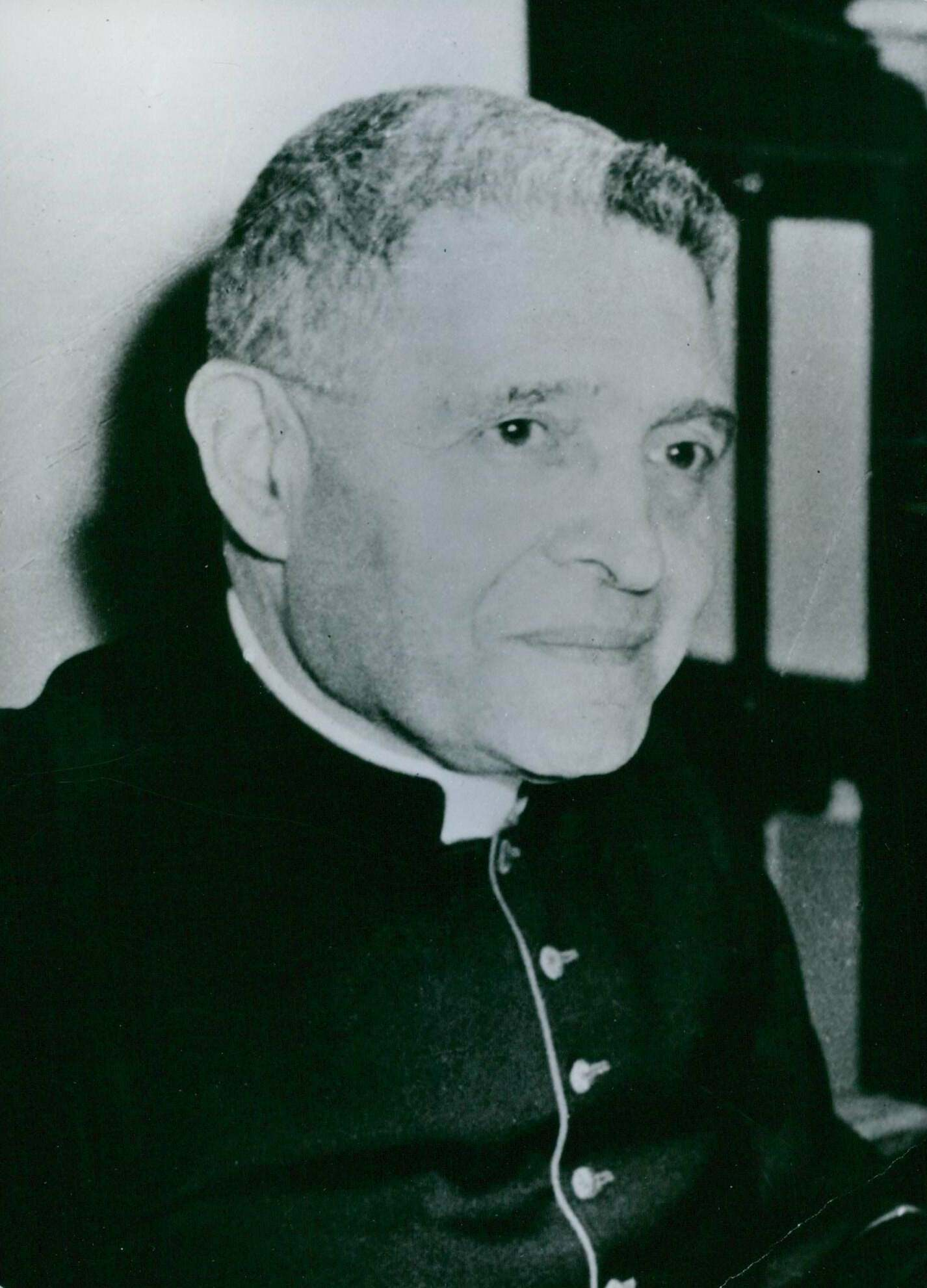
- Tardini in 1958
- Church: Roman Catholic Church
- Appointed: 15 December 1958
- Predecessor: Domenico Jorio
- Successor: Joaquín Anselmo María Albareda y Ramoneda
- Previous posts: Cardinal Secretary of State (1958–1961); Archpriest of St. Peter's Basilica (1959–1961); Titular Archbishop of Laodicea in Syria (1958)

Orders
- Ordination: 21 September 1912
- Consecration: 27 December 1958 by Pope John XXIII
- Created cardinal: 15 December 1958 by Pope John XXIII
- Rank: Cardinal-deacon

Personal details
- Born: Domenico Tardini; 29 February 1888 Rome, Kingdom of Italy
- Died: 30 July 1961 (aged 73) Rome, Italy
- Denomination: Roman Catholic

Styles of Domenico Tardini
- Reference style: His Eminence
- Spoken style: Your Eminence
- Informal style: Cardinal
- See: None

Domenico Tardini (29 February 1888 – 30 July 1961) was a longtime aide to Pope Pius XII in the Secretariat of State. Pope John XXIII named him Cardinal Secretary of State and, in this position the most prominent member of the Roman Curia in Vatican City.

== Early life ==
He attended the Angelo Braschi School and entered the Pontifical Roman Seminary in 1903 from which he graduated with honours in philosophy and theology. 21 September 1912 he was ordained a priest. He accepted a call to teach liturgy and theology at the Roman Seminary and the Collegio Urbano of the Propaganda Fide. In 1923, he was nominated by Pope Pius XI to be general assistant of the Catholic Action movement. In 1925, the Pope nominated him to a second organisation, Società della Gioventù Cattolica Italiana. From 1921 onward, he worked as well in the Congregation of Ordinary Ecclesiastical Affairs where he was named Sustituto in 1929 and Secretary in 1937. With Giovanni Battista Montini, later Pope Paul VI, he was the main assistant to Cardinal Secretary of State Eugenio Pacelli, later Pope Pius XII, until 1939.

== Secretariat of State ==
Ordination history of Domenico Tardini
History
Priestly ordination
- Date: 21 September 1912
Episcopal consecration
- Principal consecrator: Pope John XXIII
- Co-consecrators: Girolamo Bortignon, Gioacchino Muccin
- Date: 27 December 1958
Cardinalate
- Elevated by: Pope John XXIII
- Date: 15 December 1958
Episcopal succession
Bishops consecrated by Domenico Tardini as principal consecrator
- Manuel Fernández-Conde y García del Rebollar: 8 March 1959
- Gastone Mojaisky Perrelli: 1 November 1959

After his election as Pope Pius XII, Pacelli appointed Luigi Maglione as his successor as Cardinal Secretary of State. Maglione did not exercise the influence of his predecessor, who as Pope continued his close relation with Monsignori Giovanni Battista Montini and Tardini. After the death of Maglione in 1944, Pius left the position vacant and named Tardini head of its foreign section and Montini head of the internal section. Tardini and Montini continued serving there until 1952, when Pius XII decided to elevate both of them into the College of Cardinals an honour which both turned down. When Tardini thanked him for not appointing him, Pius XII replied with a smile:

- "Monsignore mio, you thank me, for not letting me do what I wanted to do. I replied, "Yes Holy Father, I thank you for everything you have done for me, but even more, what you have not done for me. The Pope smiled.

In November 1952, he was named Pro-Secretary of the State for Extraordinary Ecclesiastical Affairs by Pope Pius XII, essentially co-serving as functional Secretary of State with Giovanni Battista Montini, who became Pro-Secretary of State for Ordinary Ecclesiastical Affairs. In addition they were granted the privilege to wear Episcopal Insignia. Tardini continued in that position until the death of Pius XII.

Tardini loved children and "adopted" the orphans of Villa Nazareth, for whom he organised recognition and assistance. Televised audiences with Pope Pius XII, and visits of Pope John XXIII and high-ranking foreign dignitaries, all arranged by Tardini, facilitated fundraising for the needy children.

== Papabile and Cardinal Secretary of State ==
After the death of Pope Pius XII on 9 October 1958, Tardini, though not a cardinal and not even a bishop, was prominently mentioned as a possible successor because of his familiarity with and closeness to Pius. Instead, following the conclave, Tardini was named Secretary of State by the newly-elected Pope John XXIII, filling the previous vacancy. Having declined being made Cardinal by Pius XII in 1953, he accepted the red hat in the consistory of 15 December 1958 with the title of Cardinal-Deacon of S. Apollinare alle Terme Neroniane-Alessandrine. He was ordained as a titular archbishop later that month.

Tardini did not seek the honour of the appointment, finally, of Cardinal Secretary of State. On the very night of the election of John XXII or as the first papal appointment next morning (biographers differ on this) Tardini met with the new Pope, who asked him to become his Secretary of State. He went reluctantly:

He did not give me any choice. I told the Holy Father, that I would not serve under him, because new policies would need new people. I reminded him that I frequently disagreed with him in the past. I reminded him that I was tired and worn out and that my health was getting worse. I told him about my long cherished ambition of at last giving myself entirely to the orphan boys of Villa Nazareth. It made no difference. The Pope listened to me with kindness and interest but to every point he replied, I understand but I want you to be my Secretary of State. Finally I knelt down and offered him my obedience.

As Secretary of State, Tardini broke the taboo on discussing Vatican finances in October 1959, holding a press conference with Vatican-accredited journalists during a pay dispute with Vatican employees. On 20 January 1959, Pope John XXIII summoned Cardinal Tardini to float the idea of an Ecumenical Council. It would involve all bishops of every rite. Tardini's response was positive to the point that the Pope was surprised. John XXIII later referred to this discussion as the decisive moment for his decision to hold an ecumenical council. Tardini assisted in the preparations for Vatican II, giving at times his own interpretation of the forthcoming epochal event. Reportedly, he tried to resign several times for health reasons but was asked to stay on by the disarmingly witty John XXIII.

Tardini died in Rome on 30 July 1961 of a massive heart attack. He was buried in the Carmel at Vetralla. At the first anniversary of his death, Pope John XXIII left the Vatican to pay his respects at his burial site.

== Writings ==
- Domenico Tardini, Leone XIII, Le glorie de un pontificato, Nel venticinquesimo della morte, Roma 1928
- Domenico Tardini, Diario inedito (1933–1936) Manoscrito, 1936
- Domenico Tardini, San Tommaso d’Aquino e la Romanita, 1937
- Domenico Tardini, Gioachino Belli poeta delle plebe di Roma, 1941
- Domenico Cardinale Tardini, Pio XII, Tipografia Poliglotta Vaticana, 1960

== Honours ==
- 1935: Grand Officer in the Order of Leopold.

== Literature ==
- Carlo Felice Casula, Domenico Tardini 1888 – 1961, Edizione Studium Roma, Roma, 1988
- Peter Hebblethwaite, John XXIII, Pope of the Council, Revised Edition, HarperCollins, London, 1994
- Pascalina Lehnert, Ich durfte Ihm Dienen, Erinnerungen an Papst Pius XII., Naumann, Würzburg, 1984
- Giulio Nicolini, Il Cardinale Domenico Tardini, Messagero, Padova, ISBN 88-7026-340-1
- Pio XII, La Allocuzione nel consistorio Segreto del 12 Gennaio 1953 in Pio XII, Discorsi e Radiomessagi di Sua Santita, Vatican City, 1953
- John F. Pollard, Money and the Rise of the Modern Papacy: Financing the Vatican, 1850–1950, Cambridge University Press, 2005
- Giancarlo Zizola, L’Utopia di Papa Giovanni Citadelle Editrice, Assisi, 1973
- Burkhart Schneider, Pius XII, Friede, das Werk der Gerechtigkeit, Musterschmidt, Frankfurt, Göttingen, 1968

== Notes ==
Political offices
Preceded by Vacant (1944–1958); Luigi Maglione (1944)	Cardinal Secretary of State; 14 December 1958 – 30 July 1961	Succeeded by Amleto Giovanni Cicognani
