= Fulgenzio Arminio Monforte =

Italian Roman Catholic prelate

Most Reverend Fulgenzio Arminio Monforte
- Bishop of Nusco
- Church: Catholic Church
- Diocese: Diocese of Nusco
- In office: 1669–1680
- Predecessor: Angelo Picchetti
- Successor: Benedetto Giacinto Sangermano

Orders
- Consecration: 7 April 1669 by Francesco Maria Brancaccio

Personal details
- Born: 1620 Avellino, Italy
- Died: 1680 (age 60) Nusco, Italy

Fulgenzio Arminio Monforte, O.S.B. (1620–1680) was a Roman Catholic prelate who served as Bishop of Nusco (1669–1680).

== Biography ==
Fulgenzio Arminio Monforte was born in Avellino, Italy in 1620 and ordained a priest in the Order of Saint Benedict. On 1 April 1669, he was appointed during the papacy of Pope Clement IX as Bishop of Nusco. On 7 April 1669, he was consecrated bishop by Francesco Maria Brancaccio, Cardinal-Bishop of Frascati, wit Stefano Brancaccio, Titular Archbishop of Hadrianopolis in Haemimonto, and Emmanuele Brancaccio, Bishop of Ariano, serving as co-consecrators. He served as Bishop of Nusco until his death in 1680.

== Episcopal succession ==
While bishop, he was the principal co-consecrator of:

- Giuseppe Armenj (Armenio), Bishop of Teramo (1670); and
- Henri Provana, Bishop of Nice (1671).

== External links and additional sources ==
- Cheney, David M. "Diocese of Nusco". Catholic-Hierarchy.org. (for Chronology of Bishops) ^{[self-published]}
- Chow, Gabriel. "Diocese of Nusco (Italy)". GCatholic.org. (for Chronology of Bishops) ^{[self-published]}

Catholic Church titles
Preceded by Angelo Picchetti	Bishop of Nusco; 1669–1680	Succeeded by Benedetto Giacinto Sangermano
