= Gastone Mojaisky Perrelli =

20th-century Italian Catholic archbishop

His Excellency, The Most Reverend Gastone Mojaisky Perrelli
- Archbishop-Bishop of Nusco
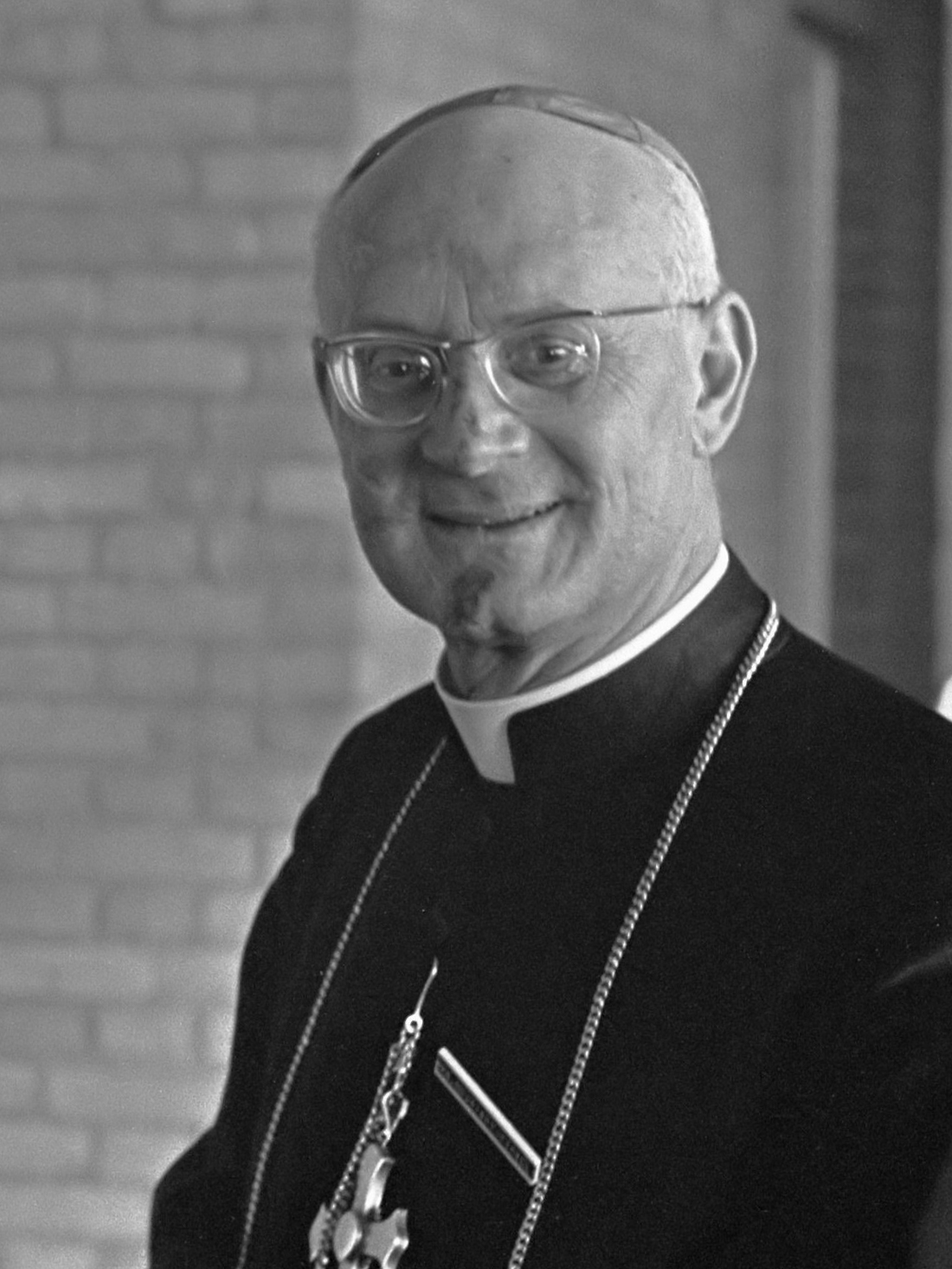
- Gastone Mojaisky Perrelli in 1967
- Church: Catholic Church
- In office: 10 May 1963–18 November 1978
- Other post: Archbishop of Coza-Sant'Angelo dei Lombardi-Bisaccia (1973–1978)
- Previous posts: Titular Archbishop of Amida (1959–1963); Apostolic Delegate to the Congo and Ruanda-Urundi (1959–1962); Apostolic Delegate to British East Africa and British West Africa (1957–1959)

Personal details
- Born: Gastone Mojaisky; 6 August 1914 Buonalbergo, Campania, Kingdom of Italy
- Died: 5 March 2008 (aged 93) Naples, Campania, Italy
- Buried: Buonalbergo, Campania, Italy
- Education: Pontifical Lateran University, Sapienza University of Rome

Ordination history of Gastone Mojaisky Perrelli
History
Priestly ordination
- Ordained by: Orazio Mazzella
- Place: Buonalbergo
Episcopal consecration
- Principal consecrator: Domenico Tardini
- Co-consecrators: Pietro Sigismondi, Vittorio Longo
Episcopal succession
Bishops consecrated by Gastone Mojaisky Perrelli as principal consecrator
- Pierre Bouckaert: 8 October 1961
- Jacques Mbali: 12 November 1961
- Joseph Sibomana: 3 December 1961
- Ferdinando Palatucci: 22 December 1968

Gastone Mojaisky Perrelli (born Gastone Mojaisky, 6 August 1914 – 5 March 2008) was an Italian Catholic archbishop. He served as Apostolic Delegate to the Congo and Ruanda-Urundi and then to British East Africa and British West Africa, during which time he held the Titular Archbishopric of Amida. He later served as Archbishop-Bishop of Nusco and as Archbishop of Conza-Sant'Angelo dei Lombardi-Bisaccia.

== Biography ==
=== Formation ===
Gastone Mojaisky was born on 6 August 1937 in Buonalbergo, a comune in the province of Benevento and the Italian region of Campania. He was born to the noble family of a Russian ambassador who was at the service of the tsar. He was the son of Alceste Perrelli of the noble family of Buonalbergo (after which the city was named) and Carlo, a lawyer and municipal secretary whose family had taken refuge in Buonalbergo for political reasons and established kinship with the illustrious families of the area, including the Perrelli, Mogavero, Cosentini, and D'Amore families, the latter two originally being from Benevento and San Marco dei Cavoti.

In Buonalbergo, Mojaisky Perrelli was raised in the Christian religion by his family, who turned to the Catholic Church after the untimely death of Alceste Perrelli and the unexpected devotion of Anna Mojaisky, Gastone's sister, who, in memory of her mother, professed her religious vows and took the name Sister Alceste before dying at a young age in 1934.

Mojaisky Perrelli was raised by his stepmother Donna Emilia D'Amore. After finishing his studies in Naples at G.B. Vico high school, he decided to enter the priesthood. He entered the Pontifical Seminary of Benevento and received his cassock as a seminarian on 14 November 1932 from Archbishop Adeodato Giovanni Piazza.

In 1937, at the Church of San Nicola di Bari in Buonalbergo, Mojaisky Perrelli was ordained a priest by Archbishop Orazio Mazzella. He later graduated from the Pontifical Lateran University, where he studied canon law, and from the Sapienza University of Rome, where he studied classical letters. He then added to his surname that of his mother, Perrelli.

=== Diplomatic career ===
During his schooling and university education, he became fluent in five languages, which enabled him to be sent to Bolivia in 1942 as secretary of the Apostolic Nunciature to Bolivia. While there, he was appointed the chargé d'affaires ad interim in 1945.

In 1946, he was sent to Santiago de Chile, then moved to Switzerland three years later as an auditor of the Apostolic Nunciature to Switzerland in Bern. In 1951, he was sent as an advisor to the Nunciature in Mexico. While rector of the Apostolic Nunciatures in Cuba and in Guatemala, he was sent by Pope Pius XII to Mombasa in 1957 as Apostolic Delegate to British East Africa and British West Africa, an assignment he later held in Léopoldville. He was given in addition the position of Apostolic Delegate to the Congo and Ruanda-Urundi on 8 August 1959.

=== Episcopal ministry ===
Mojaisky Perrelli was appointed Titular Archbishop of Amida on 8 August 1959 and was ordained a bishop on 1 November of that year by Cardinal Domenico Tardini and co-consecrators Archbishop Pietro Sigismondi and Bishop Vittorio Longo. He was a Council Father in all four periods of the Second Vatican Council from 1962 to 1965.

Mojaisky Perrelli was appointed Archbishop-Bishop of Nusco on 10 May 1963 (archbishop being granted to him as a personal title).

He was appointed Archbishop of Conza-Sant'Angelo dei Lombardi-Bisaccia on 4 August 1973, both of which he held simultaneously until 1978. In these roles, he distinguished himself for his noble, strong-willed, austere, and upright character. On 18 November 1978, after a heated conflict with the local clergy, he resigned his pastoral offices and lived near the shrine of the Most Holy Savior in Montella in near-hermitage.

In the mid-1980s, he moved to Naples, where he lived in retirement and holding the title of Archbishop Emeritus of Nusco, in a community of Vincentian priests in Via Vergini. There, he died at dawn on 5 March 2008.

Following the solemn funeral Mass celebrated by Archbishop Andrea Mugione on 7 March in Sant'Angelo dei Lombardi, he was buried in the family tomb in Buonalbergo. During his life, he was appointed a Knight of the Grand Cross of the Sacred Military Constantinian Order of Saint George.

== See also ==
- Catholic Church in Italy
- Papal diplomacy

Diplomatic posts
Preceded by James Knox	Apostolic Delegate to British East Africa and British West Africa; 1957–1959	Succeeded by Guido del Mestri
Preceded by Alfredo Bruniera	Apostolic Delegate to the Congo and Ruanda-Urundi; 1959–1962	Succeeded by Vito Roberti
Catholic Church titles
Preceded by Carlo Chiarlo	— TITULAR — Archbishop of Amida; 1959–1963	Succeeded by Robert Picard de La Vacquerie
Preceded by Guido Maria Casullo	Bishop of Nusco; 1963–1978	Succeeded by Mario Miglietta
Preceded by Cristoforo Domenico Carullo	Archbishop of Conza-Sant'Angelo dei Lombardi-Bisaccia; 1973–1978	Succeeded by Mario Miglietta
