= Antonio Nuzzi =

Italian Catholic archbishop

His Excellency, The Most Reverend Antonio Nuzzi
- Archbishop-Bishop of Teramo-Atri
- In office: 31 December 1998 – 24 August 2002

Orders
- Ordination: 7 August 1949
- Consecration: 15 March 1981 by Sebastiano Baggio

Personal details
- Born: 3 August 1926 Bojano, Molise, Italy
- Died: 8 September 2016 (aged 90)
- Denomination: Roman Catholic

Antonio Nuzzi (3 August 1926 – 8 September 2016) was an Italian Catholic archbishop.

Nuzzi served as Archbishop of Sant'Angelo dei Lombardi-Conza-Bisaccia and as Bishop of Nusco. He then was the head of the combined Archdiocese of Sant' Angelo dei Lombardi-Conza-Nusco-Bisacci. Lastly, he served as Bishop of Teramo-Atri.

== Biography ==
Antonio Nuzzi was born on 3 August 1926 in Bojano, a comune in the Province of Campobasso and the Italian region of Molise.

Nuzzi was ordained a priest on 2 April 1949 and was incardinated in the Archdiocese of Conza-Sant'Angelo dei Lombardi-Bisaccia. Pope John Paul II appointed him Archbishop of Sant'Angelo dei Lombardi-Bisaccia and Bishop of Nusco on 21 February 1981. He was consecrated a bishop on 15 March of that year by Sebastiano Baggio, the Prefect of the Congregation for Bishops, with Archbishop Pietro Santoro and Bishop Angelo Criscito as co-consecrators.

After unification of the Diocese of Nusco with the Archdiocese of Sant'Angelo dei Lombardi-Conza-Bisaccia, Nuzzi was appointed the first Archbishop of Sant'Angelo dei Lombardi-Conza-Nusco-Bisaccia. On 31 December 1988, he was appointed Archbishop-Bishop of Teramo-Atri.

On 24 August 2002, Pope John Paul II accepted his resignation due to age. He died on 8 September 2016.

Catholic Church titles
Preceded by Mario Miglietta	Bishop of Nusco; 1981–1986	Diocese suppressed
Preceded by Mario Miglietta	Archbishop of Sant'Angelo dei Lombardi-Bisaccia; 1981–1986	Succeeded by Himself as Archbishop of Conza-Sant'Angelo dei Lombardi-Bisacci
Preceded by Himself as Archbishop of Sant'Angelo dei Lombardi-Bisaccia	Archbishop of Conza-Sant'Angelo dei Lombardi-Bisacci; 1986–1988	Succeeded by Mario Milano as Archbishop of Sant'Angelo dei Lombardi-Conza-Nusco-Bisaccia
Preceded by Abele Conigli	Bishop of Teramo-Atri; 1988–2002	Succeeded by Vincenzo D’Addario
