= Aniello Campagna =

17th-century Roman Catholic bishop

Most Reverend Aniello Campagna
- Bishop of Nusco
- Church: Catholic Church
- Diocese: Diocese of Nusco
- In office: 1645–1648
- Predecessor: Giovanni Mauro
- Successor: Pietro Paolo Russo

Orders
- Consecration: 19 Mar 1645 by Ciriaco Rocci

Personal details
- Born: 1607 Naples, Italy
- Died: Jan 1648 (age 41)

Aniello Campagna (1607–1648) was a Roman Catholic prelate who served as Bishop of Nusco (1645–1648).

== Biography ==
Aniello Campagna was born in 1607 in Naples, Italy. On 6 Mar 1645, he was appointed during the papacy of Pope Innocent X as Bishop of Nusco. On 19 Mar 1645, he was consecrated bishop by Ciriaco Rocci, Cardinal-Priest of San Salvatore in Lauro, with Alfonso Sacrati, Bishop Emeritus of Comacchio, and Ranuccio Scotti Douglas, Bishop of Borgo San Donnino, serving as co-consecrators. He served as Bishop of Nusco until his death in Jan 1648.

== External links and additional sources ==
- Cheney, David M. "Diocese of Nusco". Catholic-Hierarchy.org. (for Chronology of Bishops) ^{[self-published]}
- Chow, Gabriel. "Diocese of Nusco (Italy)". GCatholic.org. (for Chronology of Bishops) ^{[self-published]}

Catholic Church titles
Preceded by Giovanni Mauro	Bishop of Nusco; 1645–1648	Succeeded by Pietro Paolo Russo
