= Pierpaolo Parisio =

Italian bishop and Cardinal

His Eminence Pierpaolo Parisio
- Cardinal-Priest of Santa Balbina
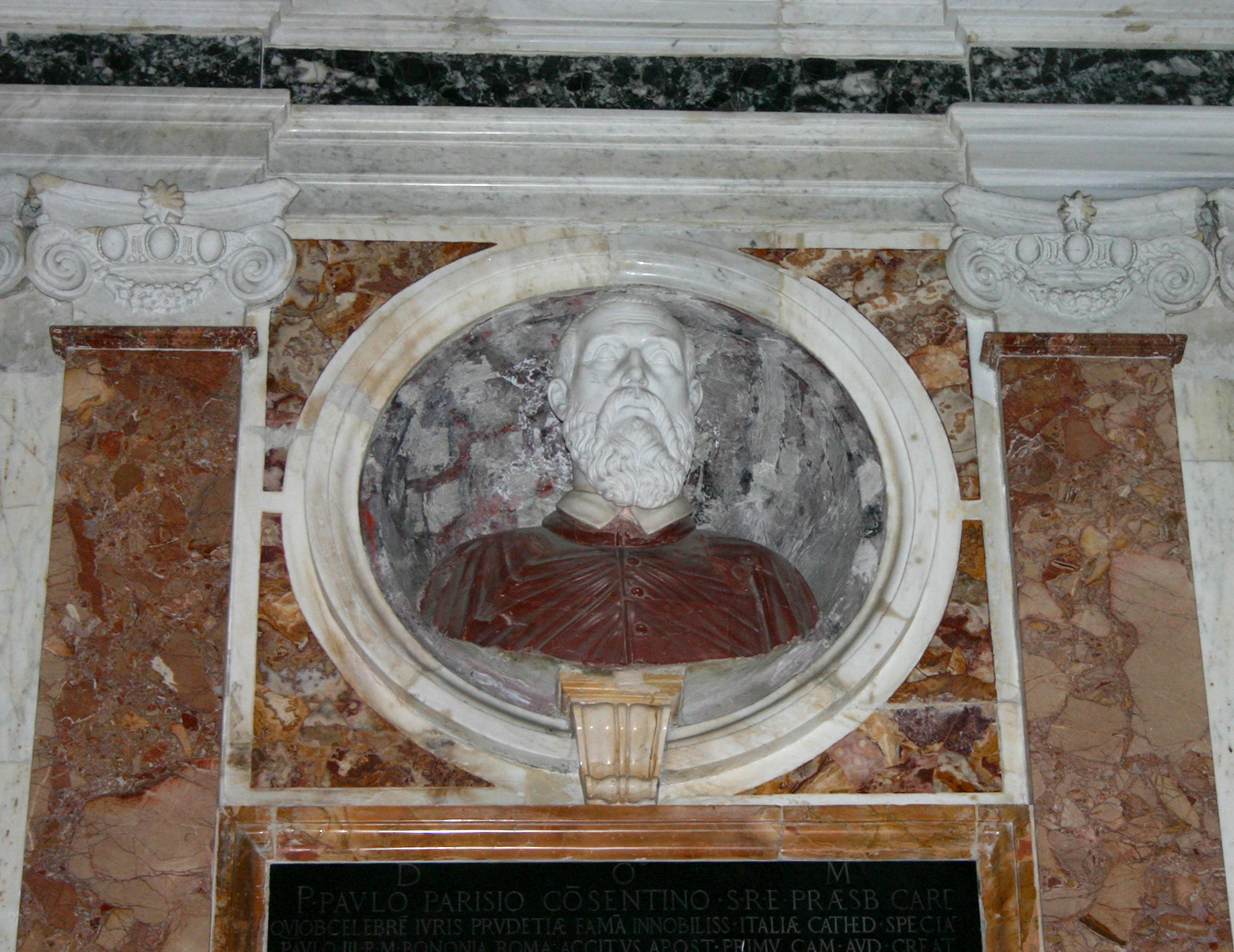
- Bust of Cardinal Pierpaolo Parisio
- Church: Catholic Church

Personal details
- Born: 1473 Cosenza, Italy
- Died: 11 May 1545 (aged 71–72) Rome, Italy

Pierpaolo Parisio (1473–1545) was an Italian bishop and Cardinal.

== Biography ==
Born at Cosenza in 1473, he was appointed on Sep 1528 by Pope Clement VII as bishop of Anglona e Tursi and on 11 Jan 1538 by Pope Paul III as bishop of Nusco. On 19 Dec 1539, he was created cardinal and installed as Cardinal-Priest of Santa Balbina on 28 Jan 1540. He died on 11 May 1545 in Rome, Italy.

== External links and additional sources ==
- Cheney, David M. "Diocese of Tursi-Lagonegro". Catholic-Hierarchy.org. (for Chronology of Bishops) ^{[self-published]}
- Chow, Gabriel. "Diocese of Tursi-Lagonegro (Italy)". GCatholic.org. (for Chronology of Bishops) ^{[self-published]}
- Cheney, David M. "Diocese of Nusco". Catholic-Hierarchy.org. (for Chronology of Bishops) ^{[self-published]}
- Chow, Gabriel. "Diocese of Nusco (Italy)". GCatholic.org. (for Chronology of Bishops) ^{[self-published]}

Catholic Church titles
Preceded by Gianvincenzo Carafa	Bishop of Anglona e Tursi; 1528-1538	Succeeded by Bernardino Elvino
Preceded by Gerolamo Acciabianca	Bishop of Nusco; 1538-1545	Succeeded by Luigi Cavalcanti
Preceded by Gasparo Contarini	Cardinal-Priest of Santa Balbina; 1540-1545	Succeeded by Jacopo Sadoleto
