= Giacinto Dragonetti =

Italian jurist and writer

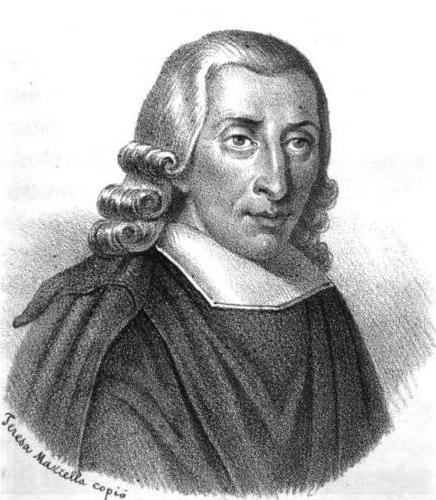
Giacinto Dragonetti (1847)

Giacinto Dragonetti (28 November 1738 – 7 September 1818) was an Italian jurist and writer. He is best known for his short book A Treatise on Virtues and Rewards, published anonymously in 1766. In it, Dragonetti advances a theory of action based on awarding virtues, as compared to the incentives/punishment-based approach in modern economics. In the introduction to the treatise, Dragonetti states "Men have made millions of laws to punish crimes, and they haven't even established one to reward virtues".

Dragonetti was born in L'Aquila to an old noble family, later moving to Rome and then to Naples in 1760. Here he became a disciple of Antonio Genovesi. His A Treatise on Virtues and Rewards, published two years after Cesare Beccaria's On Crimes and Punishments, met with success and was translated into French, English, Russian and Spanish.

His treatise on virtues was evidently read by Thomas Paine, who quotes "that wise observer of government, Dragonetti" in both Common Sense and a 1792 pamphlet.
