= Amatus of Nusco =

Italian Roman Catholic saint

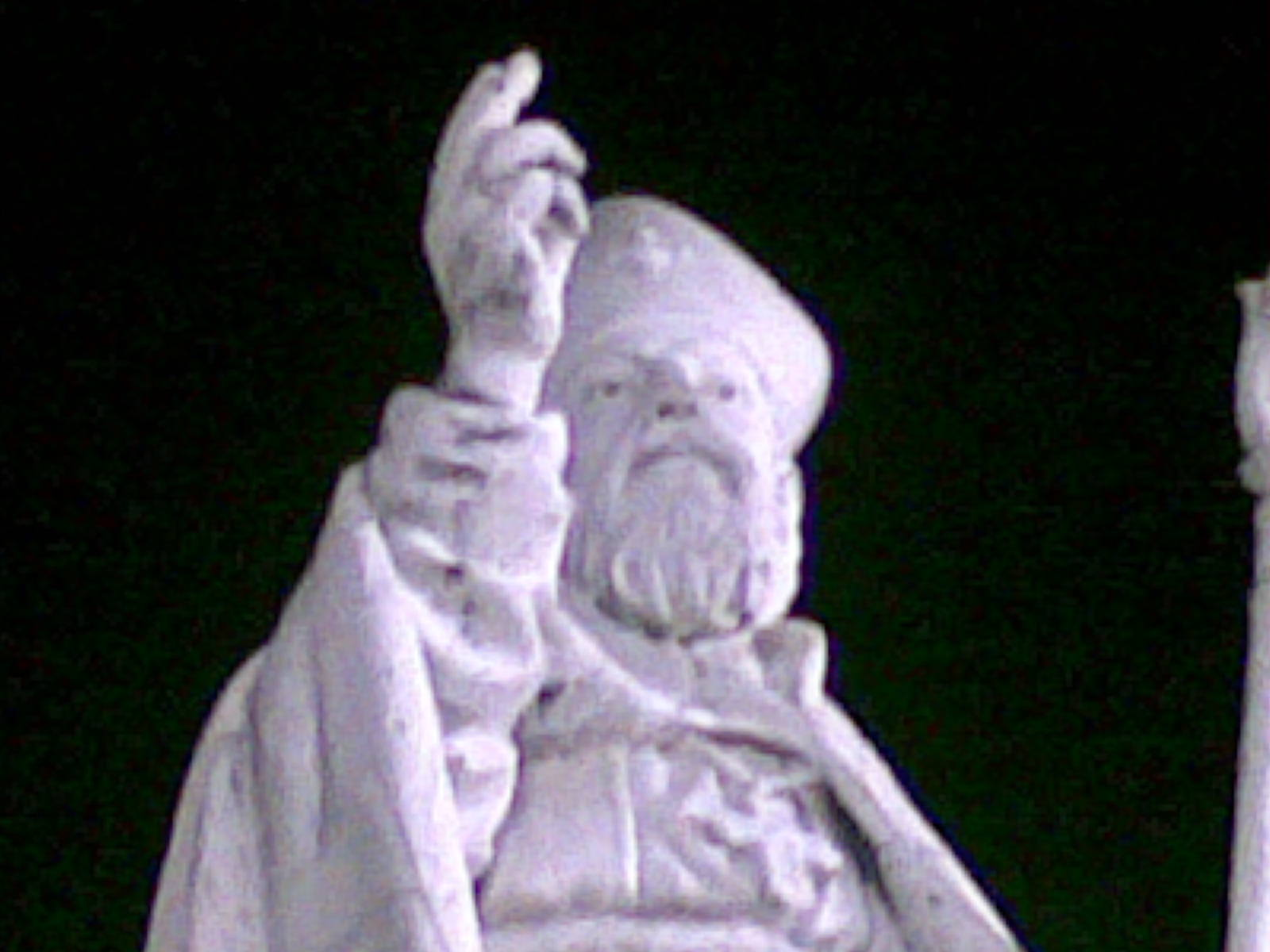
- Sant'Amato da Nusco
- Born: c. 1003
- Died: c. 1093
- Venerated in: Roman Catholic Church

Amatus of Nusco, in Italian Amato di Nusco (c. 1003–1093) was the first bishop of Nusco in Irpinia, southern Italy. The most likely account of him is that he was of noble birth, a native of the South of Italy, that he distributed all his worldly goods to the poor, became a priest, and afterwards a monk in the Abbey of Montevergine. He probably died on 30 September 1093. Numerous miracles were reported at the site of his tomb and his cult developed to the point where he became recognised as a saint in the Roman Catholic Church, celebrated in the Roman Martyrology on 30 September.

The monks of Montevergine regarded him as a disciple of William of Vercelli and accordingly argued for 30 September 1193 as the date of his death.

== Sources ==
- http://www.santiebeati.it/dettaglio/90414
