= St. Joseph's Cathedral, Fortaleza =

St. Joseph's Cathedral
- Catedral Metropolitana de São José
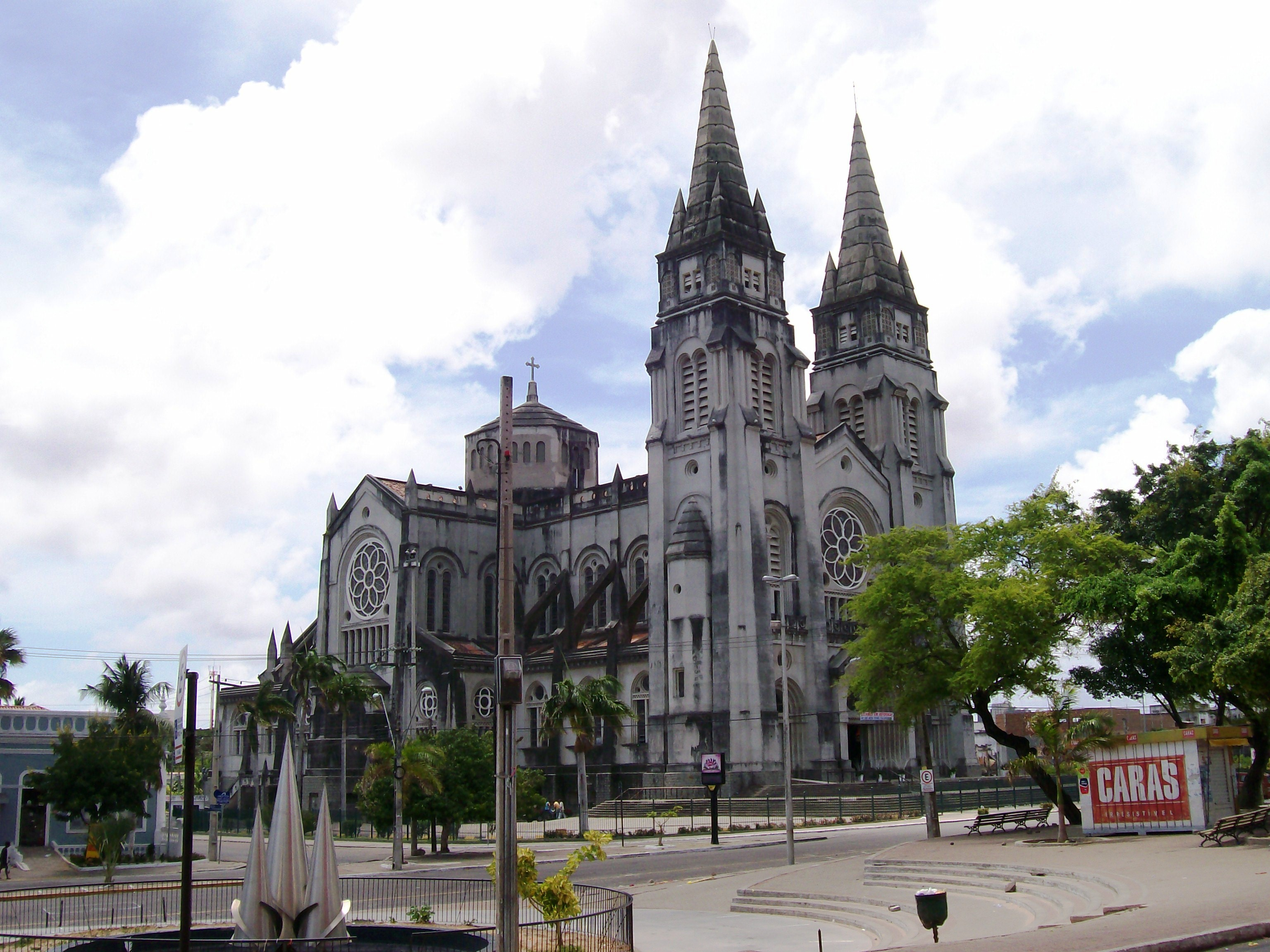
- St. Joseph's Cathedral
- 3.7248°S 38.5245°W
- Location: Fortaleza
- Country: Brazil
- Denomination: Roman Catholic Church

History
- Status: cathedral

Architecture
- Architectural type: church

Administration
- Archdiocese: Archdiocese of Fortaleza

The St. Joseph's Cathedral (Portuguese: Catedral Metropolitana de São José) also called Metropolitan Cathedral of St. Joseph is a Catholic church, home of the Archdiocese of Fortaleza, located in Fortaleza in Brazil. The present church was built on the site of the old church.

It took forty years to complete the building, beginning in 1939 and being inaugurated in 1978. It can accommodate five thousand people and its towers reach 75 meters high. French architect George Maunier signed the draft eclectic style with a predominance of neo-Gothic, with references to the Cologne Cathedral in Germany and very similar to the Chartres Cathedral in Chartres, France. São José is the saint linked to the cathedral which is also known as the Metropolitan Cathedral of Fortaleza.

== See also ==
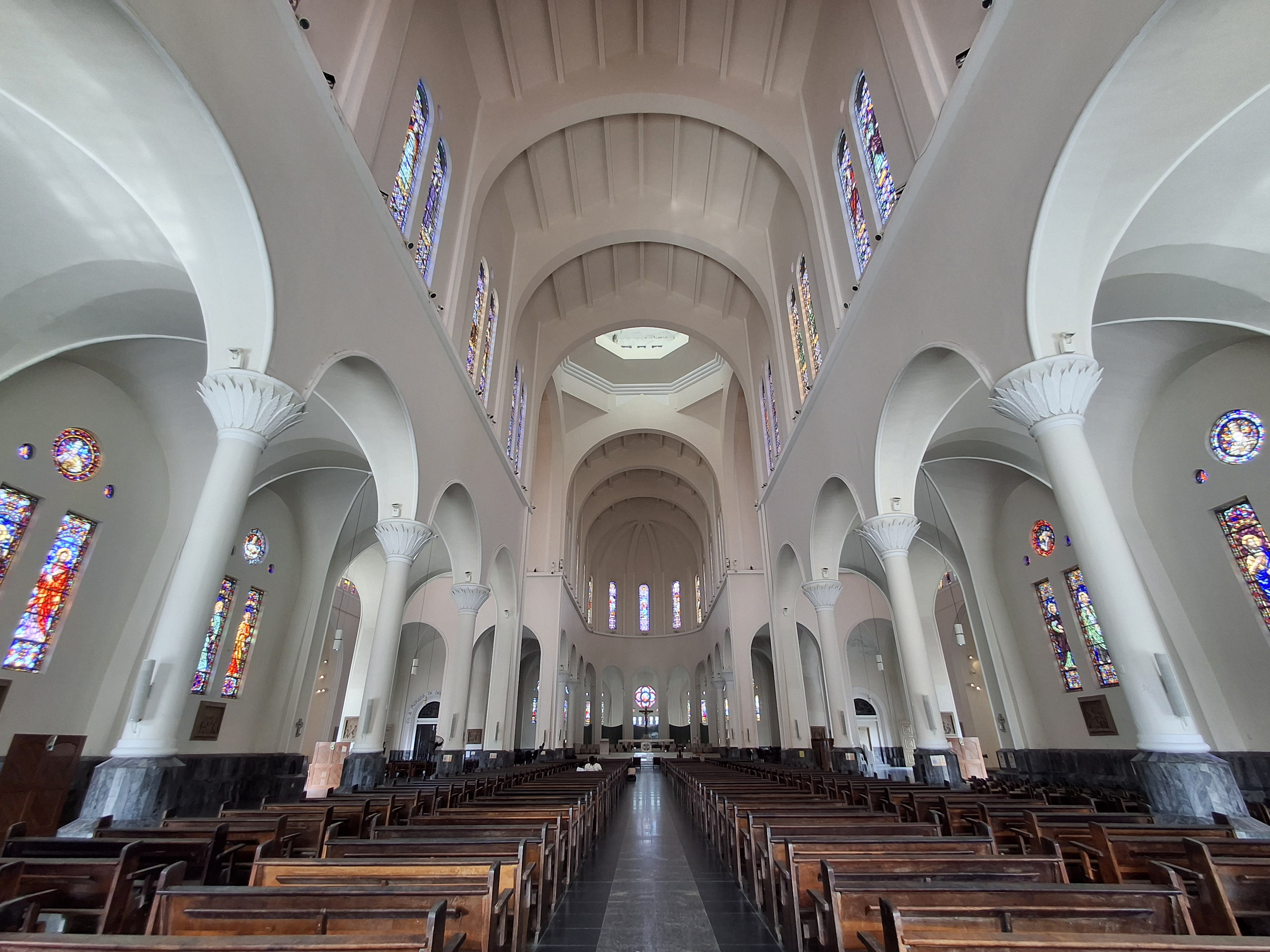
Internal view

- Roman Catholicism in Brazil
- St. Joseph's Cathedral (disambiguation)

== Texte du titre ==
- Media related to Catedral Metropolitana de Fortaleza at Wikimedia Commons
