= Franco Arminio =

Italian poet and writer

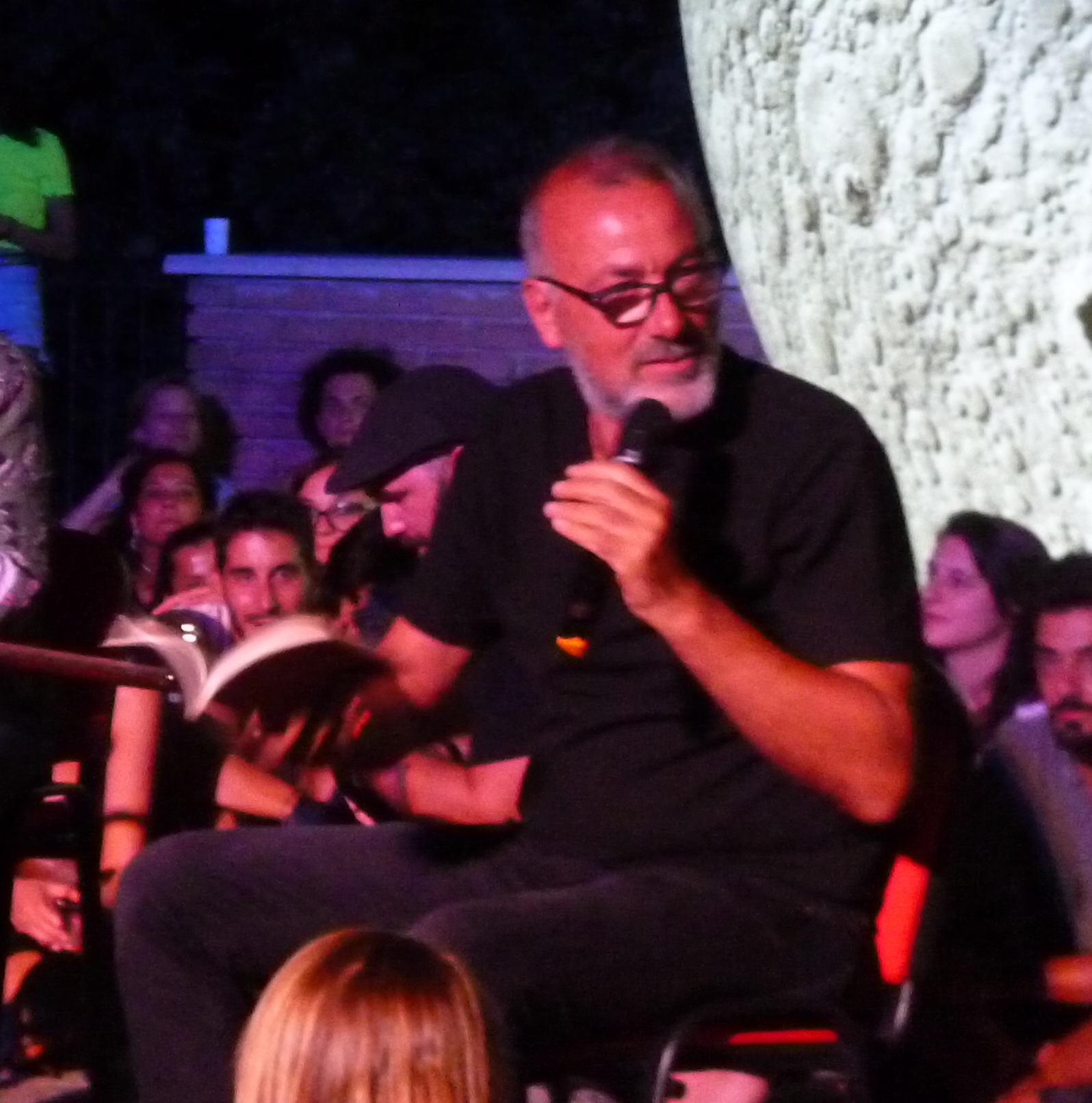
Arminio in 2019

Franco Arminio (born 1960) is an Italian poet and writer.

== Biography ==
Arminio was born in Bisaccia. His poetry focuses on the conditions of the Italian peripheral areas, particularly the south. He has also produced various documentaries and worked as a journalist for several national publications.

In 2018, he received the Brancati Prize for poetry. On 5 February 2022, one of his poems was recited by actor Filippo Scotti during the final evening of the Sanremo Music Festival.

In 2024, he co-hosted the cultural program La biblioteca dei sentimenti on Rai 3.
