= Diocese of Pinheiro =

Catholic ecclesiastical territory

Diocese of Pinheiro Dioecesis Pinerensis

Catholic

Location
- Country: Brazil
- Ecclesiastical province: São Luís do Maranhão

Statistics
- Area: 14,744 km^{2} (5,693 sq mi)
- Population: Total; Catholics: (as of 2004); 435,240; 348,192 (80.0%)

Information
- Rite: Latin Rite
- Established: 22 July 1939 (87 years ago)
- Cathedral: Catedral Santo Inácio de Loiola

Current leadership
- Pope: Leo XIV
- Bishop: Elio Rama, I.M.C.
- Metropolitan Archbishop: Gilberto Pastana de Oliveira
- Bishops emeritus: Ricardo Pedro Paglia, M.S.C.

The Roman Catholic Diocese of Pinheiro (Latin: Dioecesis Pinerensis) is a diocese located in the city of Pinheiro in the ecclesiastical province of São Luís do Maranhão in Brazil.

== History ==
- 22 July 1939: Established as Territorial Prelature of Pinheiro from the Territorial Prelature of São José do Grajaú and Metropolitan Archdiocese of São Luís do Maranhão
- 16 October 1979: Promoted as Diocese of Pinheiro

== Bishops ==
- Apostolic Administrator
  - Carlos Carmelo de Vasconcellos Motta † (1940 - 1944) Archbishop of São Luís do Maranhão
- Prelates of Pinheiro (Roman Rite)
  - José Maria Lemerder † (1944 - 1946) Died
  - Alfonso Maria Ungarelli, M.S.C. † (13 Nov 1948 - 1 Mar 1975) Retired
  - Carmelo Cassati, M.S.C. (17 Jun 1975 - 12 Feb 1979) Appointed, Bishop of Tricarico
  - Ricardo Pedro Paglia, M.S.C. (3 Jul 1979 - 16 Oct 1979) Appointed Bishop here
- Bishops of Pinheiro (Roman rite)
  - Ricardo Pedro Paglia, M.S.C. (16 Oct 1979 – 17 Oct 2012) Retired
  - Elio Rama, I.M.C. (17 Oct 2012–present)

=== Auxiliary bishops ===
- Guido Maria Casullo (1963-1965), appointed Prelate of Cândido Mendes, Maranhão
- Carmelo Cassati, M.S.C. (1970-1975), appointed Prelate here
