= Nusco =

- Comune
- Comune di Nusco
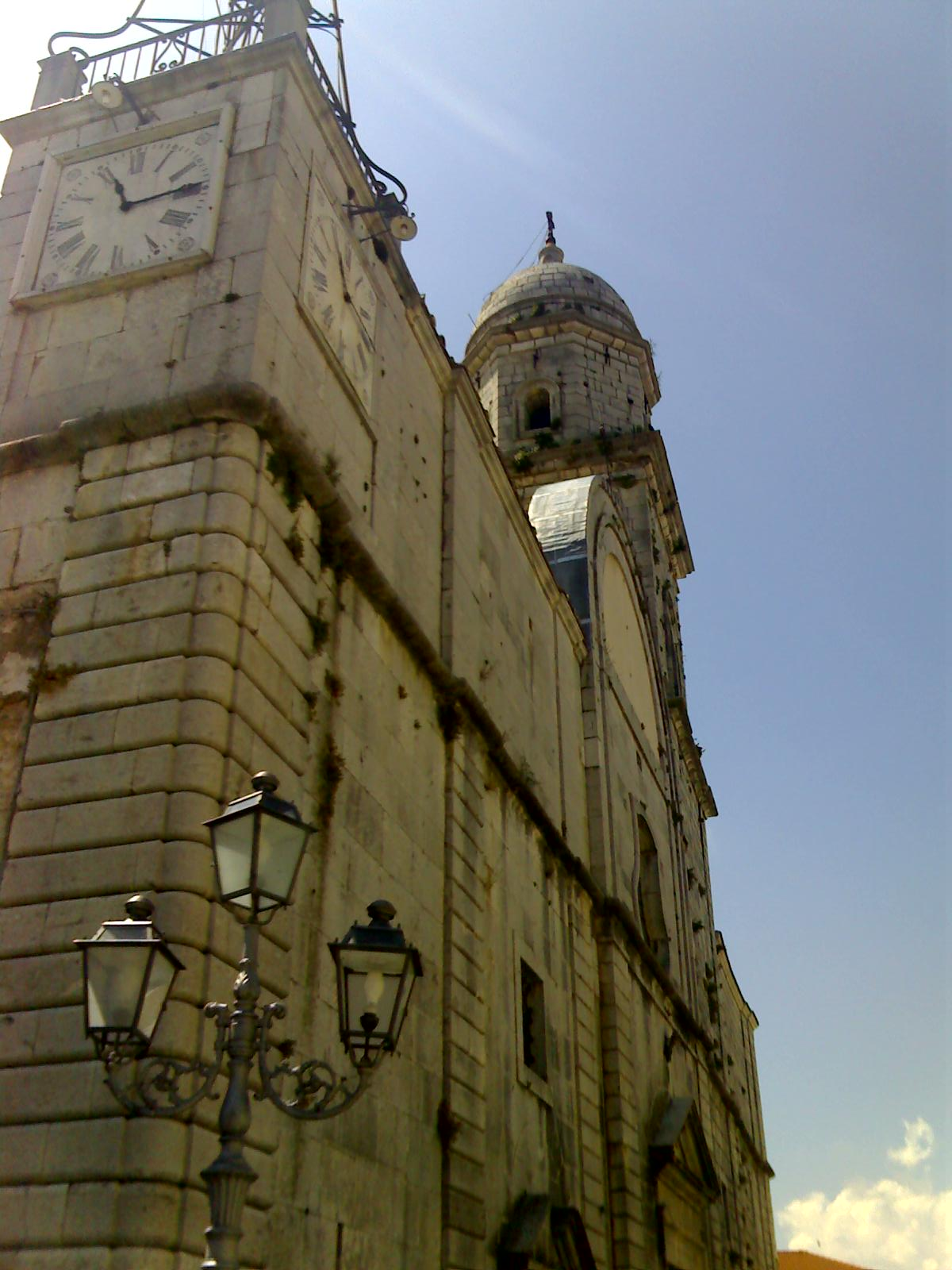
- Cathedral of Nusco.

- Location within Italy Location within Campania
- Coordinates: 40°53′13″N 15°5′2″E
- Country: Italy
- Region: Campania
- Province: Avellino (AV)
- Frazioni: Ponteromito

Government
  - Mayor: Antonio Iuliano

Area
  - Total: 53.6 km^{2} (20.7 sq mi)
- Elevation: 914 m (2,999 ft)

Population (30 November 2017)
  - Total: 4,148
  - Density: 77.4/km^{2} (200/sq mi)
- Demonym: Nuscani
- Time zone: UTC+1 (CET)
  - Summer (DST): UTC+2 (CEST)
- Postal code: 83051
- Dialing code: 0827
- ISTAT code: 064066
- Patron saint: Sant'Amato
- Saint day: 30 September
- Website: Official website

Nusco (Irpino: Nùscu) is a town and comune in the province of Avellino (Campania region) in the south of Italy, east of Naples, with a population of around 4,100. It is situated in the mountains between the valleys of the Calore Irpino and Ofanto rivers. It is one of I Borghi più belli d'Italia ("The most beautiful villages of Italy").

== History ==
Hannibal crossed this area during the Punic Wars. According to legend, some of Hannibal's elephants became ensconced in the mud of the river to the east. As his elephants drowned, the General mourned the death of these great beasts. As such, the river that extends through this valley became known as, and remains known as, the Ofanto (a corruption of Italian "elefante") River.

The Lombards built a castle in Nusco to defend the valley from the Ofanto river to the Calore. It played a very important role in Irpinia life until the 17th century. In 1656, plague struck Irpinia, killing up to a third of Nusco's population. In addition to the high death toll, the plague irrevocably changed Nusco's social structure. The town started to lose its economic power, and until the second half of the 20th century Nusco's history was strictly linked to the history of the Church.

For years, Nusco experienced the poverty and misery typical of rural towns. Vestiges of feudal relationships left the peasant farmers with little wealth. In the late 19th century, families left Nusco for other, wealthier regions of Italy, as well as for new opportunities in South America and the United States. These emigrants from Nusco never forgot their roots. Some later returned to their homeland.

The 1980 Irpinia earthquake did not destroy the oldest and most important buildings.

== Main sights ==
- The Lombard castle, built around the 9th century.
- The Cathedral, whose Renaissance portal was moved to the church of St. Anthony in 1548.
- The Church of Saint Stephen, holding the remains of Saint Amatus of Nusco.
- The Church of Saint Anthony, which stands beneath the remains of the old castle, just beyond the Superior Gate that allowed entrance into the eastern section of the medieval town.
- Every year in mid-January, the inhabitants organize "La Notte dei Falò" (Bonfire Night), a traditional event where they light large fires in the streets.

== Twinned towns ==
- Lanciano, Italy
- Vinci, Italy

== People ==
- Nicholas Laucella (1882 – 1952), Principal Flautist with the New York Philharmonic and the Metropolitan Opera Orchestra
- Ciriaco De Mita (1928 – 2022), Politician who served as Prime Minister of Italy from April 1988 to July 1989.

== See also ==
- Roman Catholic Archdiocese of Sant’Angelo dei Lombardi–Conza–Nusco–Bisaccia
- Roman Catholic Diocese of Nusco

== Sources and external links ==
- Official website
