= Jusepe de Ribera =

Spanish painter (1591–1652)

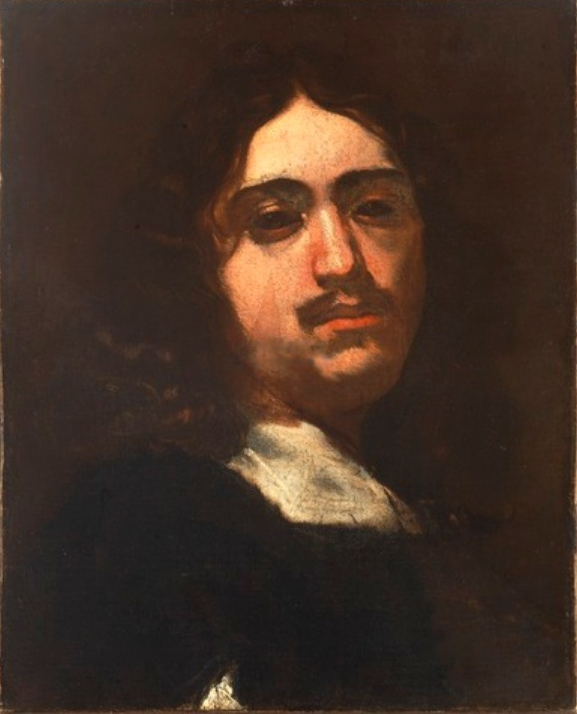
- Self-portrait, c. 1630
- Baptised: 17 February 1591; Játiva, Valencia, Spain
- Died: 3 November 1652 (aged 61); Mergellina, Naples, Italy
- Occupations: Painter and printmaker
- Years active: 1611–1652
- Known for: Drunken Silenus, Magdalena Ventura with Her Husband and Son, The Martyrdom of Saint Philip, Clubfooted Boy, The Holy Family with Saints Anne and Catherine of Alexandria
- Movement: Spanish Baroque

Signature
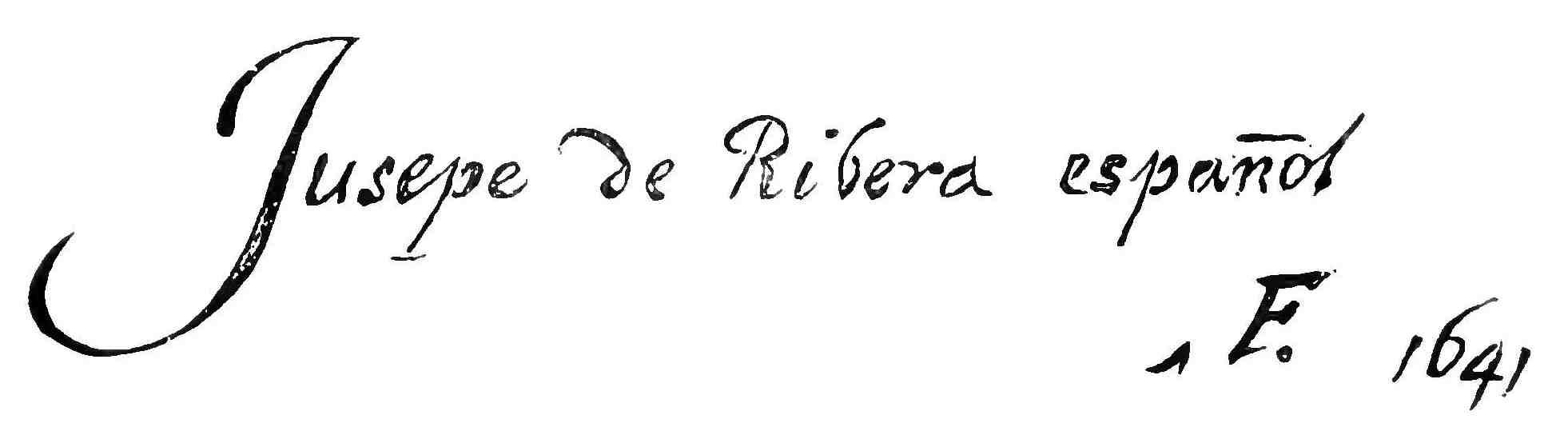

Jusepe de Ribera (Valencian: [josep ðe riˈβeɾa]; baptised 17 February 1591 – 3 November 1652) was a Spanish painter and printmaker. Ribera, Francisco de Zurbarán, Bartolomé Esteban Murillo, and Diego Velázquez, are regarded as the major artists of Spanish Baroque painting. Referring to a series of Ribera exhibitions held in the late 20th century, Philippe de Montebello wrote "If Ribera's status as the undisputed protagonist of Neapolitan painting had ever been in doubt, it was no longer. Indeed, to many it seemed that Ribera emerged from these exhibitions as not simply the greatest Neapolitan artist of his age but one of the outstanding European masters of the seventeenth century." Jusepe de Ribera has also been referred to as José de Ribera (usual in Spanish and French), and was called Lo Spagnoletto (Italian for "the Little Spaniard") by his contemporaries and early historians.

Ribera created history paintings, including traditional Biblical subjects and episodes from Greek mythology. He is perhaps best known for his numerous views of martyrdom, which at times are brutal scenes depicting bound saints and satyrs as they are flayed or crucified in agony. Less familiar are his occasional, but accomplished portraits, still lifes and landscapes. Nearly half of his surviving work consist of half length portraits of workers and beggars, often older individuals in ragged clothes, posing as various philosophers, saints, apostles and allegorical figures. Ribera's paintings, particularly his early work, are characterized by stark realism using a chiaroscuro or tenebrist style. His later work embraced a greater use of color, softer light, and more complex compositions, although he never entirely abandoned his Caravaggisti leanings.

Very little is known about the first 20 years of his life and there are many gaps concerning his later life and career. He was baptized on 17 February 1591, in Játiva, Spain, his father identified as a shoemaker. He is not recorded again until 1611, when records show he was paid for a painting (now lost) for a church in Parma, Italy. Documents show he was a member of the Accademia di San Luca in Rome by October 1613 and living in a house in the Via Margutta in 1615–16, at that time known as "the foreigner's quarter", apparently living a bohemian life with his brothers and other artists. Anecdotal accounts written at the time indicate he quickly earned a reputation as an outstanding painter after arriving in Rome and was earning great profits, but also noted his laziness and extravagant spending.

Ribera moved to Naples in late 1616, under Spanish rule at that time, and in November married Caterina Azzolino, the daughter of Sicilian painter Giovanni Bernardino Azzolini. There he remained for the rest of his life, setting up a workshop with many pupils, securing commissions, and establishing an international reputation. In 1626 he received the Cross of the Order of Christ from Pope Urban VIII. His health began to deteriorate in 1643 and his productivity declined from that time on, and by 1649 he was experiencing financial hardships as well. However, when his health permitted, he continued to produce several acclaimed paintings into the last year of his life.

== Life ==
=== Early biographies ===
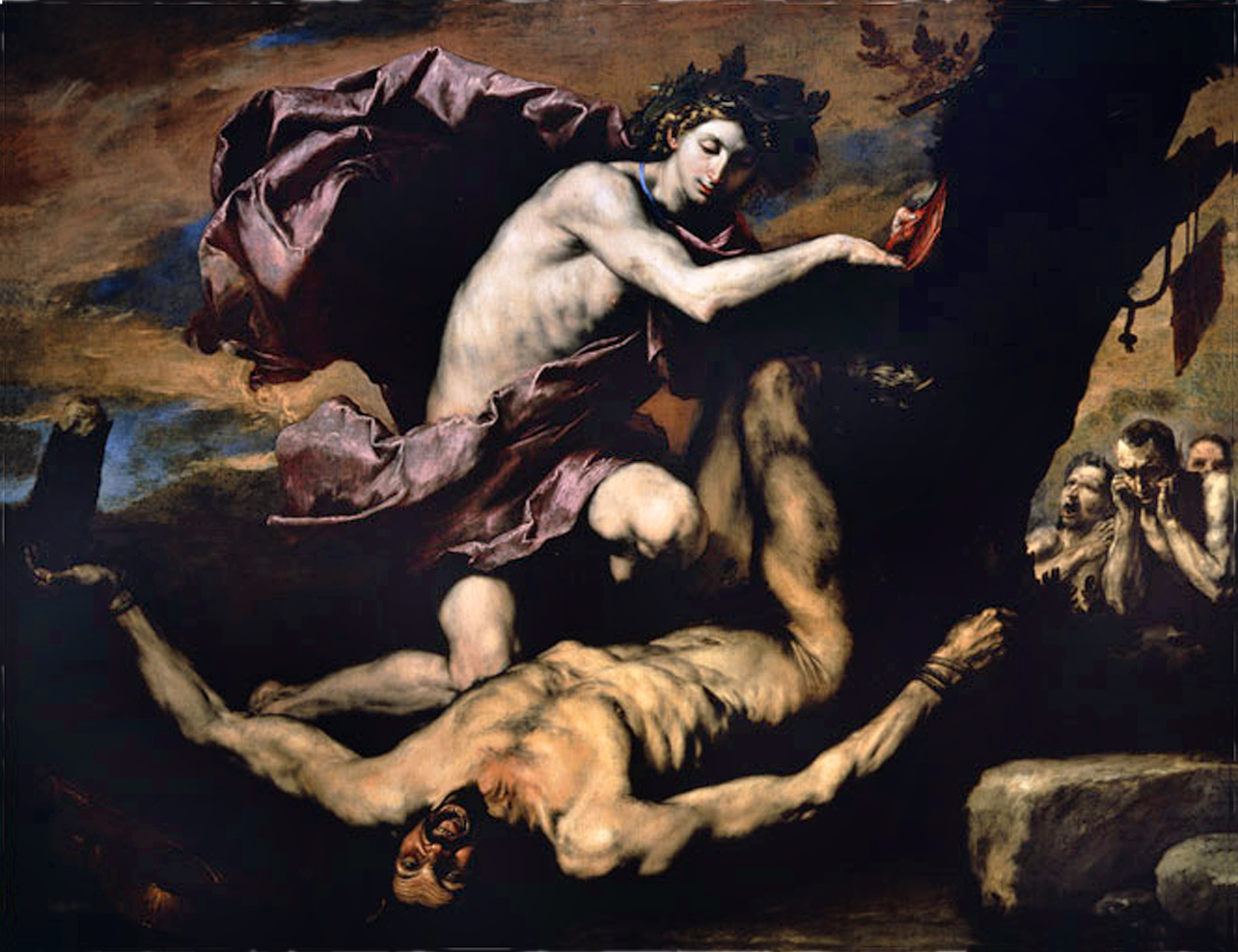
Apollo and Marsyas, 1637, 182 x 232 cm., National Museum of San Martino

His Italian biographers have many tales to tell of Ribera's stormy, picaresque career, and picture "Lo Spagnoletto's" life as an endless series of professional intrigues and rivalries, attempted poisonings due to gelosia di mestiere, conspiracies and brawls, triumphs and adversities, dramatic love affairs. Alterations of dark patches and dazzling light, glooms and raptures – just as in his paintings. Perhaps we would do better to keep to the records and established dates of Ribera's life." Jacques Lassaigne (1952)

Biographers of Ribera in the 17th and 18th century, including Bernardo de' Dominici, Carlo Celano, and Palomino de Castro y Velasco produced a substantial amount of information on the artist's life that is now known to be erroneous. Much of this misinformation was pervasive well into the 20th century and is occasionally still repeated today. It was long believed he was born in 1587, De Dominici saying he was from Gallipoli, Apulia while Celano stated he was from Lecce. One said he descended from nobility, and another identified his father as a Spanish army officer. Research and documents emerged in the 20th century have proven these false. Other episodes and events in Ribera's life remain unverified. Early accounts (still repeated today) state that Ribera began his art education in Valencia, where he was a pupil of Francesc Ribalta. Although this is entirely plausible, there is no real evidence to confirm it.

De Dominici's biography described Ribera as an egotistical and condescending individual of reprehensible behavior. He was reputed to have been chief of the so-called Cabal of Naples, his abettors being a Greek painter, Belisario Corenzio and the Neapolitan Battistello Caracciolo. However, there are no real documents or records to substantiate (or discredit) this other than these early biographies. De Dominici's biography has been called "barefaced lies" by one modern historian, and "a caricature" by another, although the latter noted a critical examination of it can still provide some insights.

=== Early life (1591–1616) ===
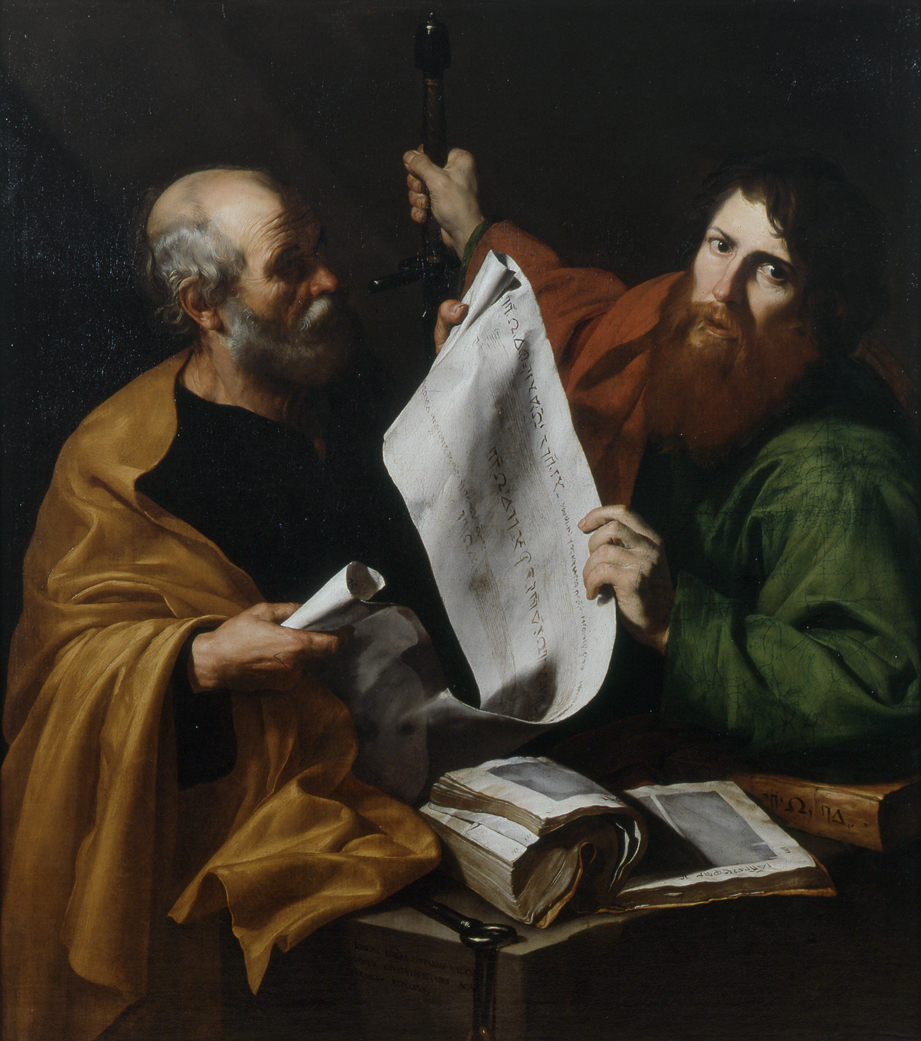
Saint Peter and Saint Paul, ca. 1616, oil on canvas, 126 x 112 cm., Musée des Beaux-Arts de Strasbourg

Little information is available on Ribera's youth. It was as recent as 1923 that the year of his birth was positively established. He was baptized on 17 February 1591, in Játiva, Spain, about 60 km. (37 mi.) south of Valencia. His parents were identified as Simón and Margarita (née Cucó) Ribera, married in 1588, and his father's occupation a shoemaker. Other baptismal records show the couple had two other sons, Jerónimo (b.1588) and Juan (b.1593). A gap of 20 years follows his baptism record, including information regarding his childhood, education, teachers, and when he left Spain.

Ribera's move to the Italian peninsula and his training as an artist have been subjects of interest to art historians in recent decades. His 18th century biographer Palomino wrote that he apprenticed with the Spanish painter Francesc Ribalta in Valencia, and this was generally accepted by historians into the mid to late 20th century, although no proof of this connection exists. Recently, historians have begun to question this scenario. There is some evidence to suggest Ribera might have been in Italy as early as 1608-1609 (age 17 or 18), or even as early as 1605-1606 (age 14 or 15). Marriage records show that his father, Simón, married a second time in 1597 when Jusepe was six years old, and a third time in 1607 when he was 16, suggesting some disruption and lack of continuity in Ribera youth. Recent decades have also shed light on Ribera's presumed teacher Francesc Ribalta, whose early works exhibit a mannerist style, and is now known to have only reached his final and mature period, reflecting a realist and Caravaggesque current about 1614, at which point Ribera is already documented working in Italy. Some historians also believe Ribera's drawing technique shows a thoroughly Italian education and influences.

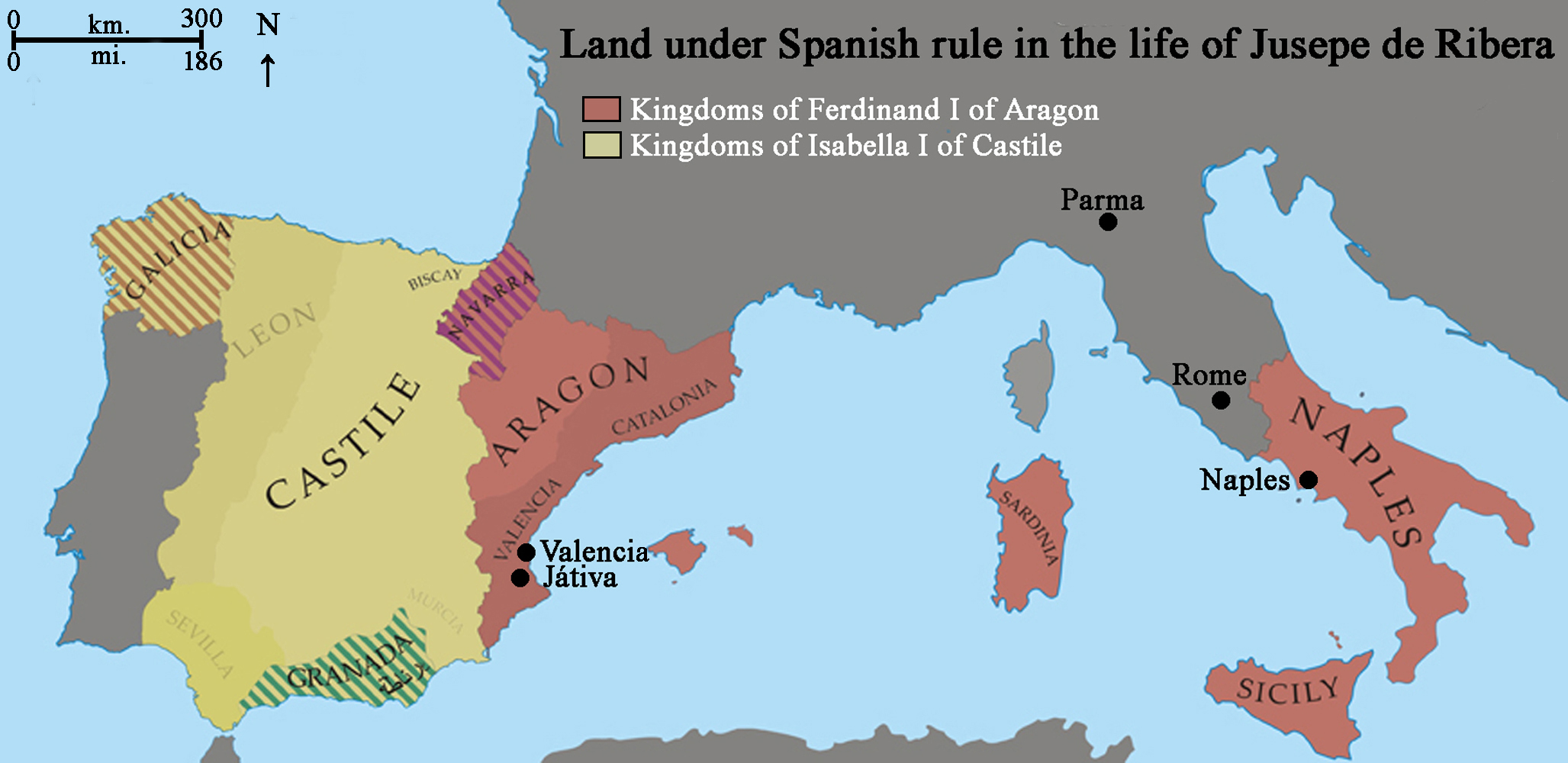
Land under Spanish rule in the life of Jusepe de Ribera (1591–1652): Játiva, birth 1591; Valencia, purported apprenticeship with Francisco Ribalta; Parma, first documented painting 1611; Rome, lived ca. 1612-1616; Naples, lived 1616–1652 and death

Records show Ribera was in Parma, Italy in June 1611, where he received payment for a painting of Saint Martin Sharing His Cloak with a Beggar, for the Church of San Prospero. It is notable and some indication of Ribera's reputation that a foreigner, at the age 20, was given a commission for a public altarpiece. Ludovico Carracci wrote in 1618, that Ribera was under the protection of the ducal family (House of Farnese) while in Parma which aroused some resentment from local artist. The painting, now lost, is known from copies and prints and was often praised in the local literature until it was taken by Napoleon's troops.

The artist is next confirmed in Rome in October 1613, where records show he was a member of the Accademia di San Luca. Parish registries (Status animarum) verify he observed Easter in 1615 and 1616 and was living in a house on the Via Margutta, then known as the foreigners quarter, with others including his brothers Jerónimo, and Juan who is also known to have been a painter. At that time Rome was the most important center of painting, "the fountainhead of the Baroque", where artist from throughout Europe gravitated, including painters such as Gerrit van Honthorst from the Netherlands, Simon Vouet from France, Adam Elsheimer from Germany, and many others, all exploring various aspects of chiaroscuro and tenebrism in the wake of Caravaggio. The last records of the artist in Rome are a payment of promised alms to the Accademia de San Luca in May 1616, and a bank transaction in July 1616.

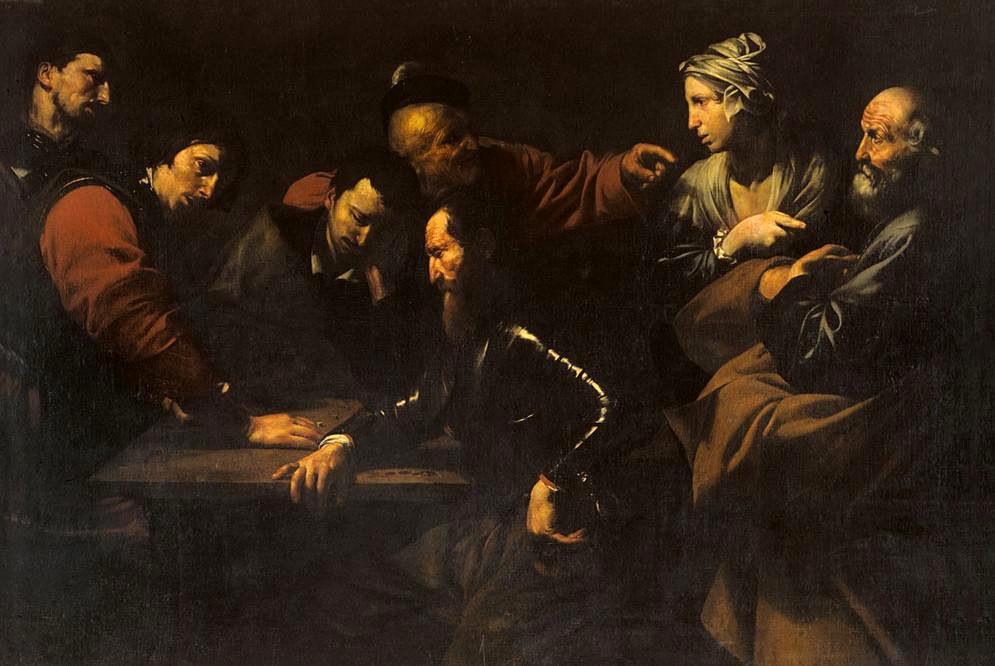
The Denial of St Peter, c. 1615-16. oil on canvas, 163 x233 cm., Galleria nazionale d'arte antica

In his Considerazioni sulla pittura (1614–1621) Giulio Mancini wrote a brief account of Ribera's time in Rome. He stated that Guido Reni was an admirer of Ribera's work and that a painter of Ribera's disposition had not been seen in the city for many years, exceptionally high praise in reference to an art center like Rome. He characterized Ribera as a follower of Caravaggio, but more experimental and bolder. According to Mancini, Ribera began working for daily wages in other artists workshops and in time developed a strong reputation and was making great profits. He wrote that Ribera had some problems with Roman authorities when he neglected his Easter confession one year (likely 1614 or earlier). Mancini stated that Ribera could also be lazy at times, indulged in extravagant spending, and that he left Rome in order to avoid his creditors.

=== Neapolitan period (1616–1643) ===
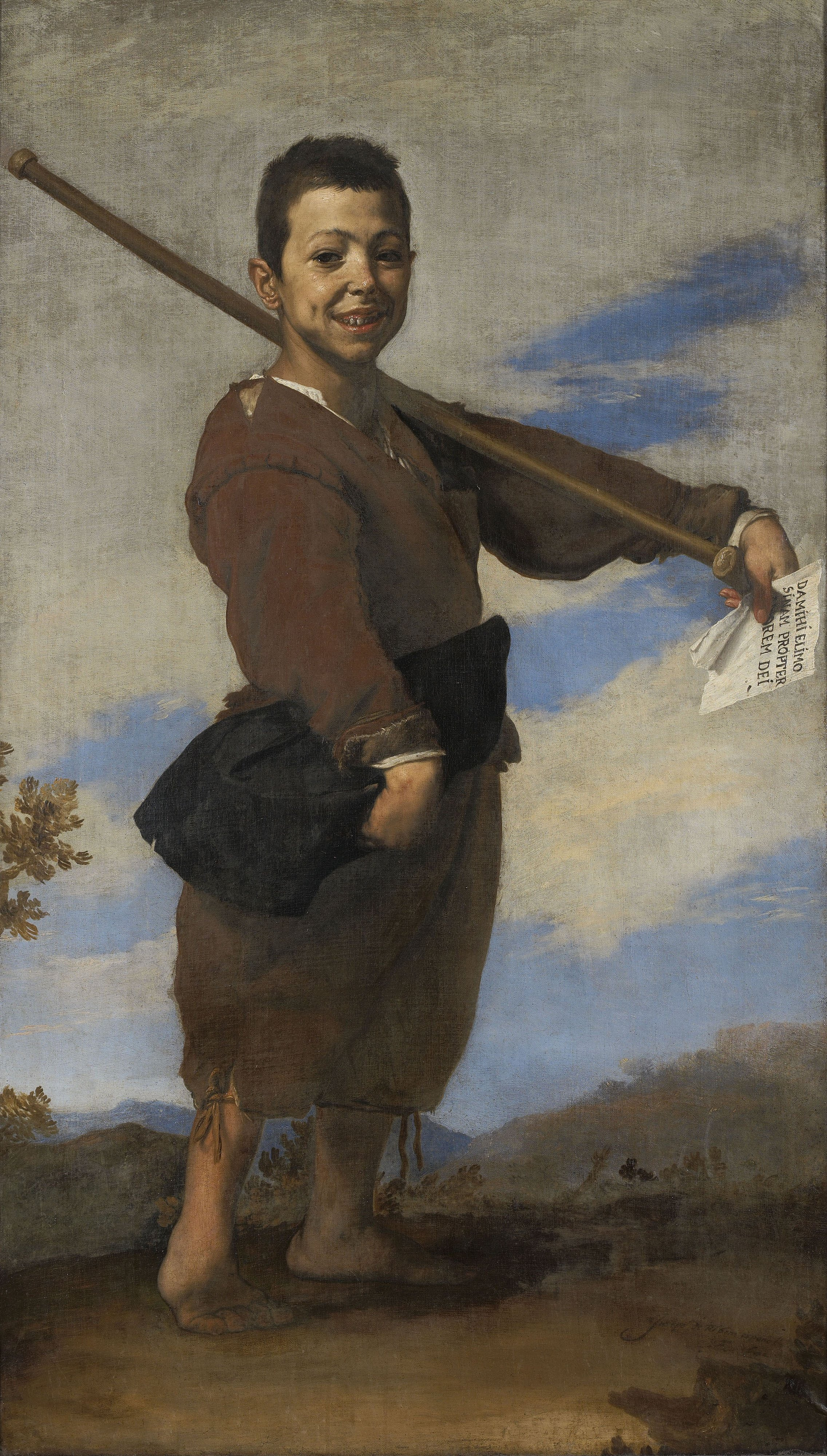
Clubfooted Boy, 1642, oil on canvas, 164 x 94 cm. Louvre

The Kingdom of Naples was part of the Spanish Empire during Ribera's lifetime, and was ruled by a succession of Spanish Viceroys. In 1616, Ribera moved to Naples permanently, in order to avoid his creditors (according to Giulio Mancini, who described him as living beyond his means despite a high income). In November, 1616, Ribera married Caterina Azzolino, the daughter of a Sicilian-born Neapolitan painter, Giovanni Bernardino Azzolino, whose connections in the Neapolitan art world helped to establish Ribera early on as a major figure whose presence was to have a lasting impact on the art of the city. His Spanish nationality aligned him with the small Spanish governing class in the city, as well as with important collectors and art dealers from the Spanish Netherlands. At this point Ribera began to sign his work as "Jusepe de Ribera, español" ("Jusepe de Ribera, Spaniard"). He was able to quickly attract the attention of the Viceroy, Pedro Téllez-Girón, 3rd Duke of Osuna, another recent arrival, who gave him a number of major commissions, which showed the influence of Guido Reni.

Few paintings survive from 1620 to 1626, but this was the period in which most of his best prints were produced. These were at least partly an attempt to attract attention outside of Ribera's Neapolitan circles. His career picked up in the late 1620s, and he was accepted as the leading painter in Naples thereafter. He received the Order of Christ of Portugal from Pope Urban VIII in 1626.

Although Ribera never returned to Spain, many of his paintings were taken back by returning members of the Spanish governing class, such as the Duke of Osuna, and his etchings were brought to Spain by dealers. His influence can be seen in the works of Velázquez, Murillo, and most other Spanish painters of the period.

He has been characterized as selfishly protecting his prosperity, and is reputed to have been chief of the so-called Cabal of Naples, his abettors being a Greek painter, Belisario Corenzio and the Neapolitan Giambattista Caracciolo.

It is said this group aimed to monopolize Neapolitan art commissions, using intrigue, sabotage of work in progress, and even personal threats of violence to frighten away outside competitors such as Annibale Carracci, the Cavalier d'Arpino, Guido Reni, and Domenichino. All of them were invited to work in Naples, but found the place inhospitable. The cabal disbanded at the time of Domenichino's death in 1641.

Ribera's pupils included Hendrick de Somer, Francesco Fracanzano, Luca Giordano, and Bartolomeo Passante. He was followed by Giuseppe Marullo and influenced the painters Agostino Beltrano, Paolo Domenico Finoglio, Giovanni Ricca, and Pietro Novelli.

=== Later life (1644–1652) ===
Around 1644, his daughter married a Spanish nobleman in the administration, who died soon after. From 1644, Ribera's ill health greatly reduced his ability to work, although his workshop continued to produce works under his direction. In 1647–1648, during the uprising against Spanish rule, he and his family took refuge in the palace of the Viceroy. In 1651 he sold his home, and was in dire financial straits by the time of his death in September 1652.

== Work ==
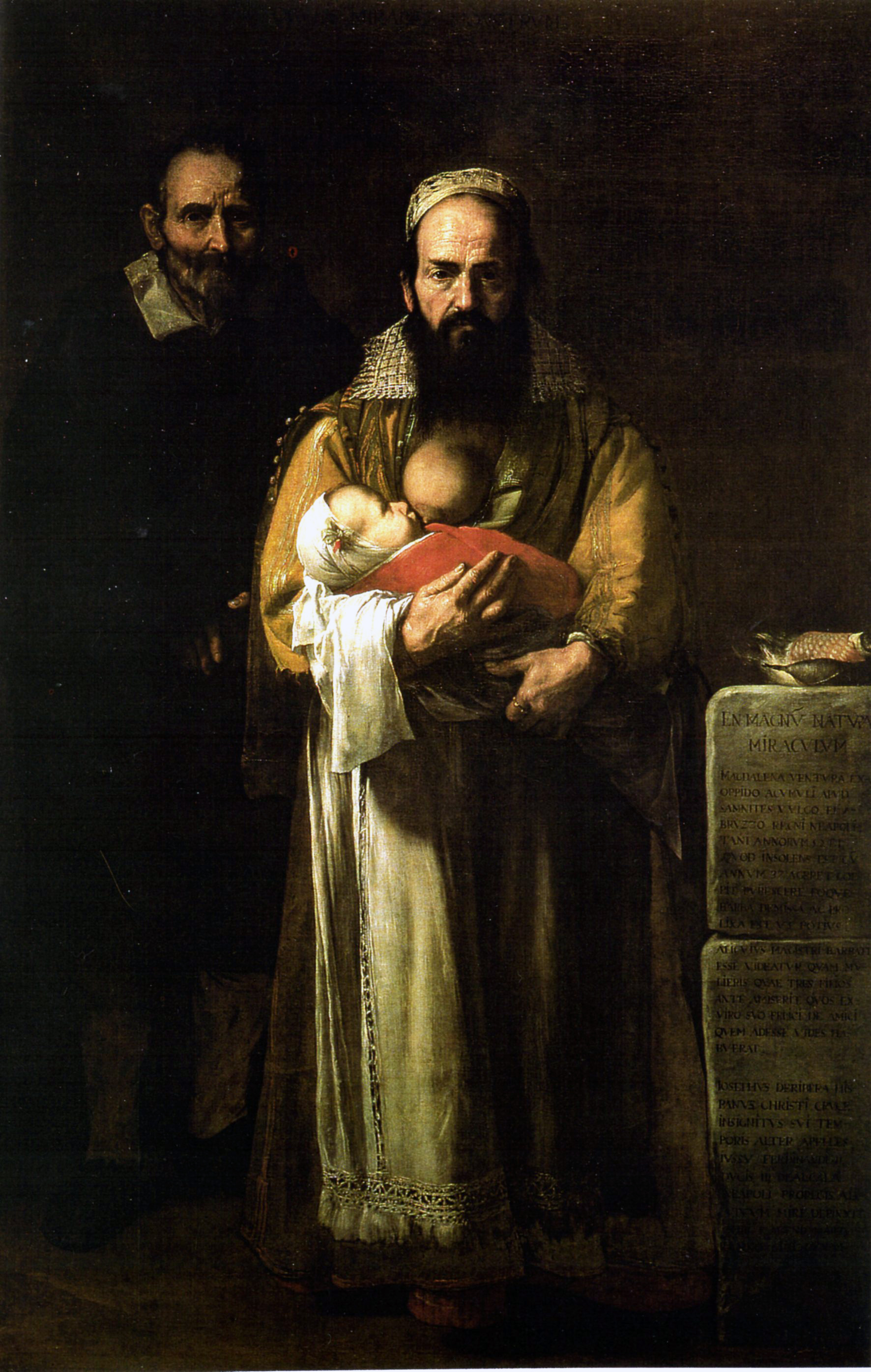
Magdalena Ventura with Her Husband and Son, "Bearded Lady", 1631, Prado Museum on loan by Fundación Casa Ducal de Medinaceli

His early style was influenced by the study of the Spanish and Venetian masters as well as Caravaggio and Correggio. His subject matter was notoriously gruesome, portraying human cruelty and violence with startling naturalism. In the early 1630s his style shifted from stark tenebrism to a more diffused lighting, as seen in The Clubfoot of 1642.

Nearly half of Ribera's entire oeuvre consist of half-length representations of saints, apostles, philosophers, scientists, and allegorical figures. The models for these paintings were the natives from the streets of Rome and Naples, typically humble people such as fishermen, dockworkers, elderly people, and beggars, often characterized by wrinkled skin and ragged clothes, painted with a raw visual intensity.

Ribera's landscapes were recorded in 18th and 19th century inventories and have been praised in historical literature. However, it was not until the late 20th century when a pair of large canvases (127 x 269 cm.) executed in 1639, were identified in the collection of the Palacio de Monterrey, Salamanca, that surviving examples of his pure landscape paintings were known modern scholars. Landscapes are rare subjects in Spanish painting before the 19th century. Among the very few examples are two small oils executed by Velázquez on a visit to Italy. Contemporary historians have remarked on the originality of Ribera's approach to the subject and noted a contrast with Roman landscape painting of the period, exemplified in the work of Nicolas Poussin and Claude Lorrain. Art historian Alfonso Pérez Sánchez, former director of the Prado Museum, wrote that these landscapes "assure Ribera a principal place in the history of Neapolitan landscape painting" and that "Ribera has given the landscapes his own stamp: even without the signature they would be recognizable as his."

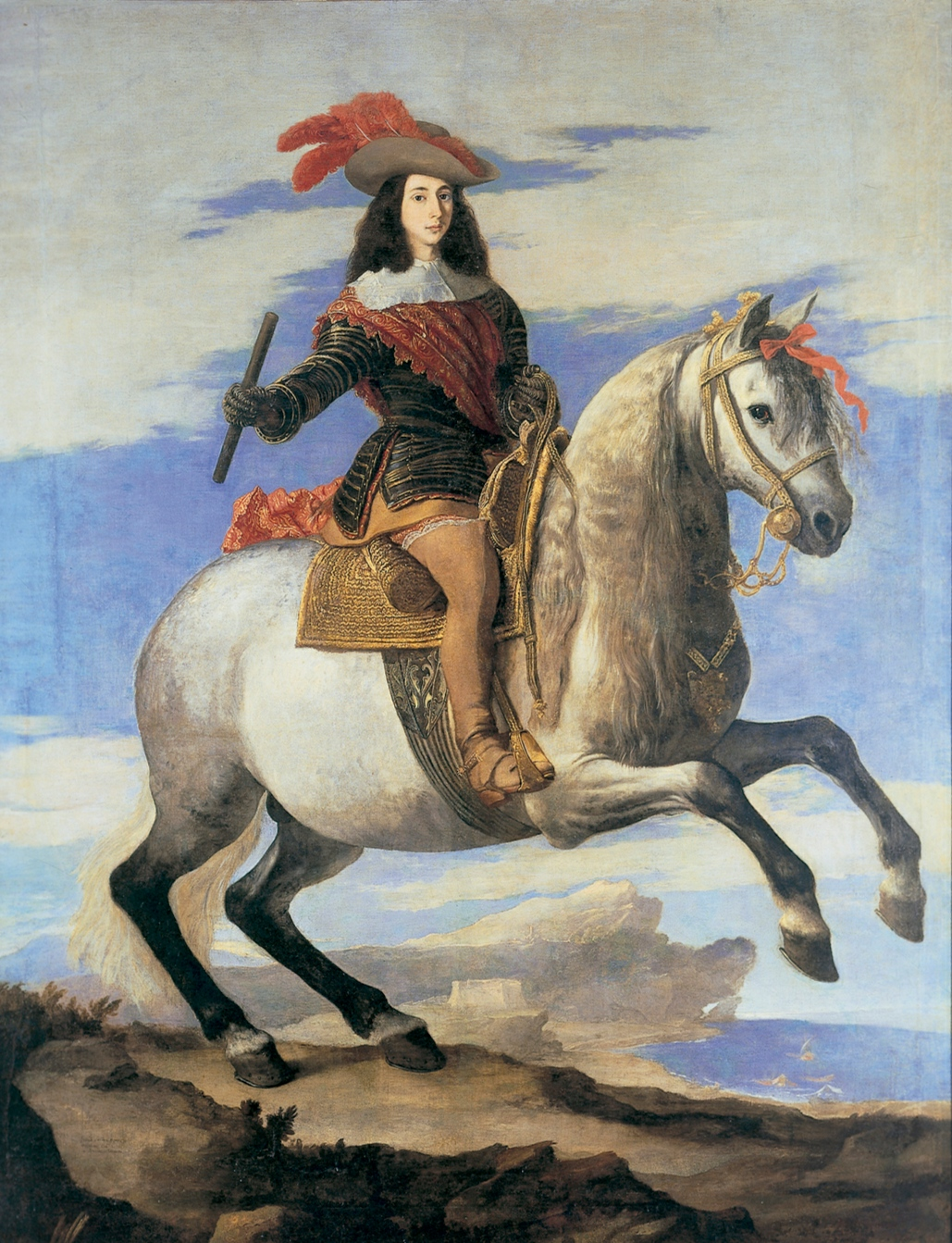
Portrait of John Joseph of Austria, 1638, Royal Collections Gallery, Madrid

He executed several fine male portraits and a self-portrait. The only equestrian portrait painted by Ribera, depicting Philip IV's son and viceroy of Naples John Joseph of Austria, is exhibited in the Royal Collections Gallery.

He was an important etcher—indeed, the most significant Spanish printmaker before Goya—producing about twenty prints, nearly all in the 1620s.

Some major works include Saint Januarius Emerging from the Furnace in Naples Cathedral; the Descent from the Cross in the Certosa di San Martino, Naples; the Adoration of the Shepherds (1650) in the Louvre; the Martyrdom of Saint Bartholomew in the Museu Nacional d'Art de Catalunya, Barcelona; and the Pieta in the sacristy of San Martino, Naples. His mythologic subjects are often as violent as his martyrdoms, the most famous being his renditions of Apollo and Marsyas, now in Brussels and Naples, and his Tityos, now in the Museo del Prado. Alongside eleven drawings, the Prado owns fifty-six paintings and another six attributed to Ribera such as Jacob’s Dream (1639), The Martyrdom of Saint Philip (1639; often described as Saint Bartholomew due to overlapping iconography) or Saint Jerome Writing (1644), credited to him by Gianni Papi, a Caravaggio expert; the Louvre contain four of his paintings and seven drawings; the National Gallery, London owns three; and the Real Academia de Bellas Artes de San Fernando owns an ensemble of five paintings including The Assumption of Mary Magdalene from El Escorial, and an early Ecce Homo or The head of St John the Baptist.

== Legacy ==
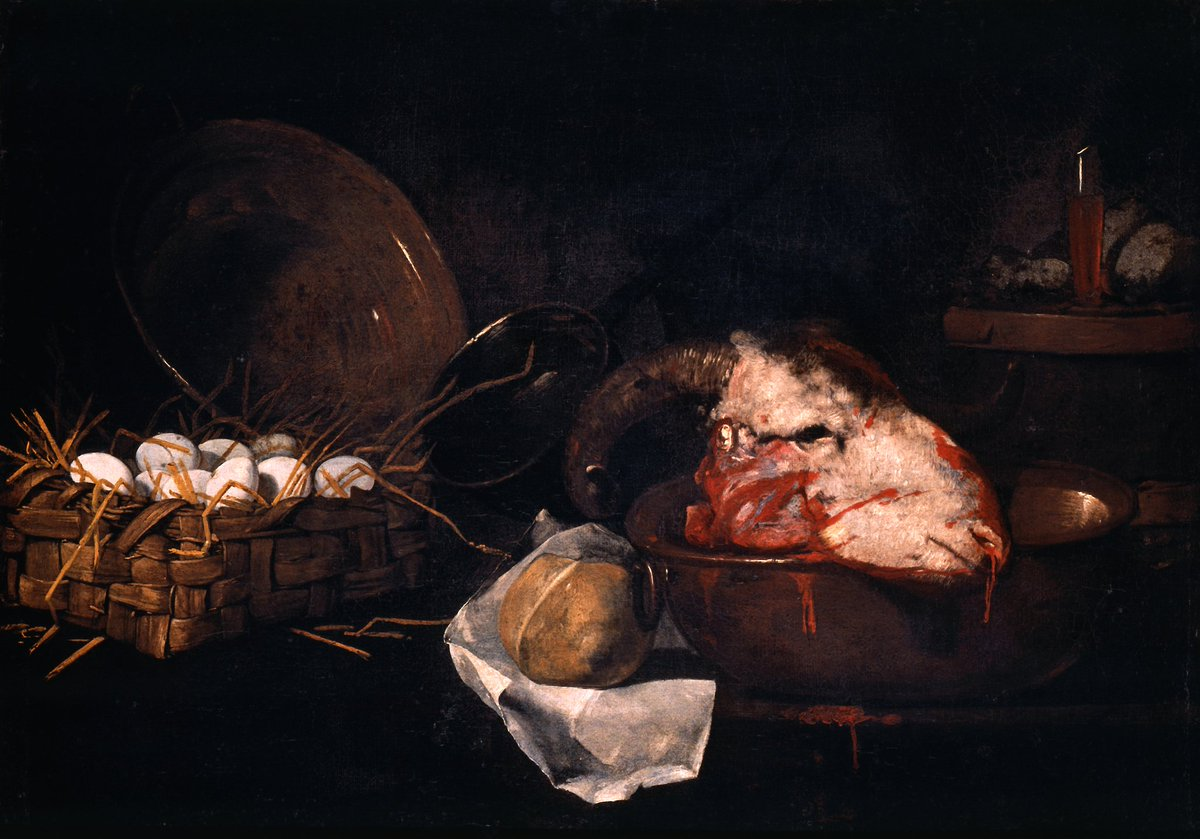
Kitchen with Goat's Head, 1650, Museo di Capodimonte

Salvator Rosa and Luca Giordano were his most distinguished followers, who may have been his pupils; others were also Giovanni Do, the Flemish painter Hendrick de Somer (known in Italy as 'Enrico Fiammingo'), Michelangelo Fracanzani, and Aniello Falcone, who was the first considerable painter of battle-pieces.

Ribera's work remained in fashion after his death, largely through the adoption of his hyper-naturalistic depictions of violence in the paintings of pupils like Luca Giordano. The gradual rehabilitation of his international reputation was aided by exhibitions in Princeton in 1973, of his prints and drawings, and of works in all media in London at the Royal Academy in 1982 and in New York at the Metropolitan Museum of Art in 1992. Since then his oeuvre has gained more attention from critics and scholars. In 2006, a catalogue raisonné of Ribera's work was published, written by the former director of the Museo di Capodimonte in Naples, Nicola Spinosa.

== Selected works ==
=== Oil paintings ===
History paintings (oil on canvas unless noted otherwise)

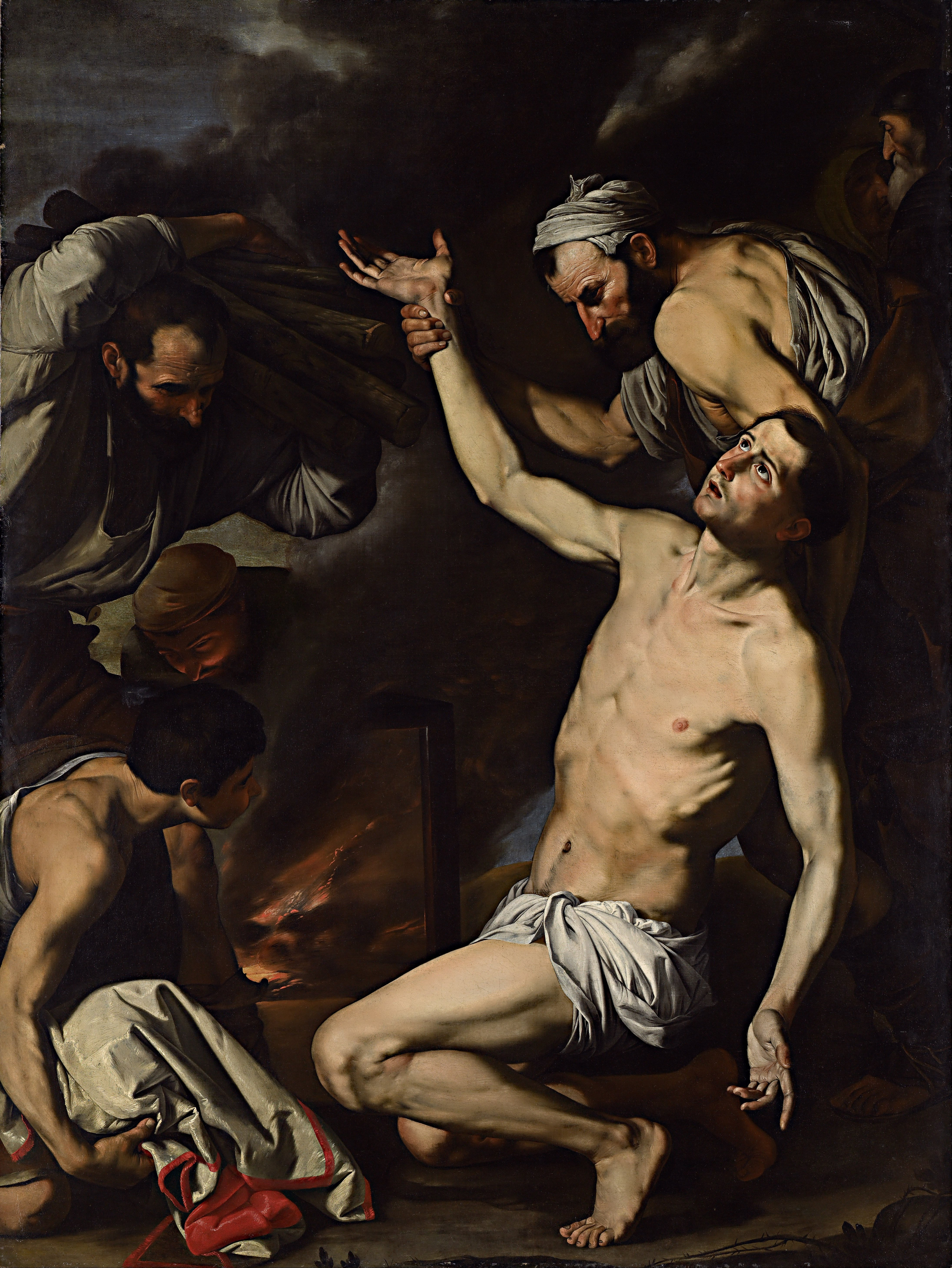
Martyrdom of Saint Lawrence, 1620–1624, 208 x 155 cm., National Gallery of Victoria

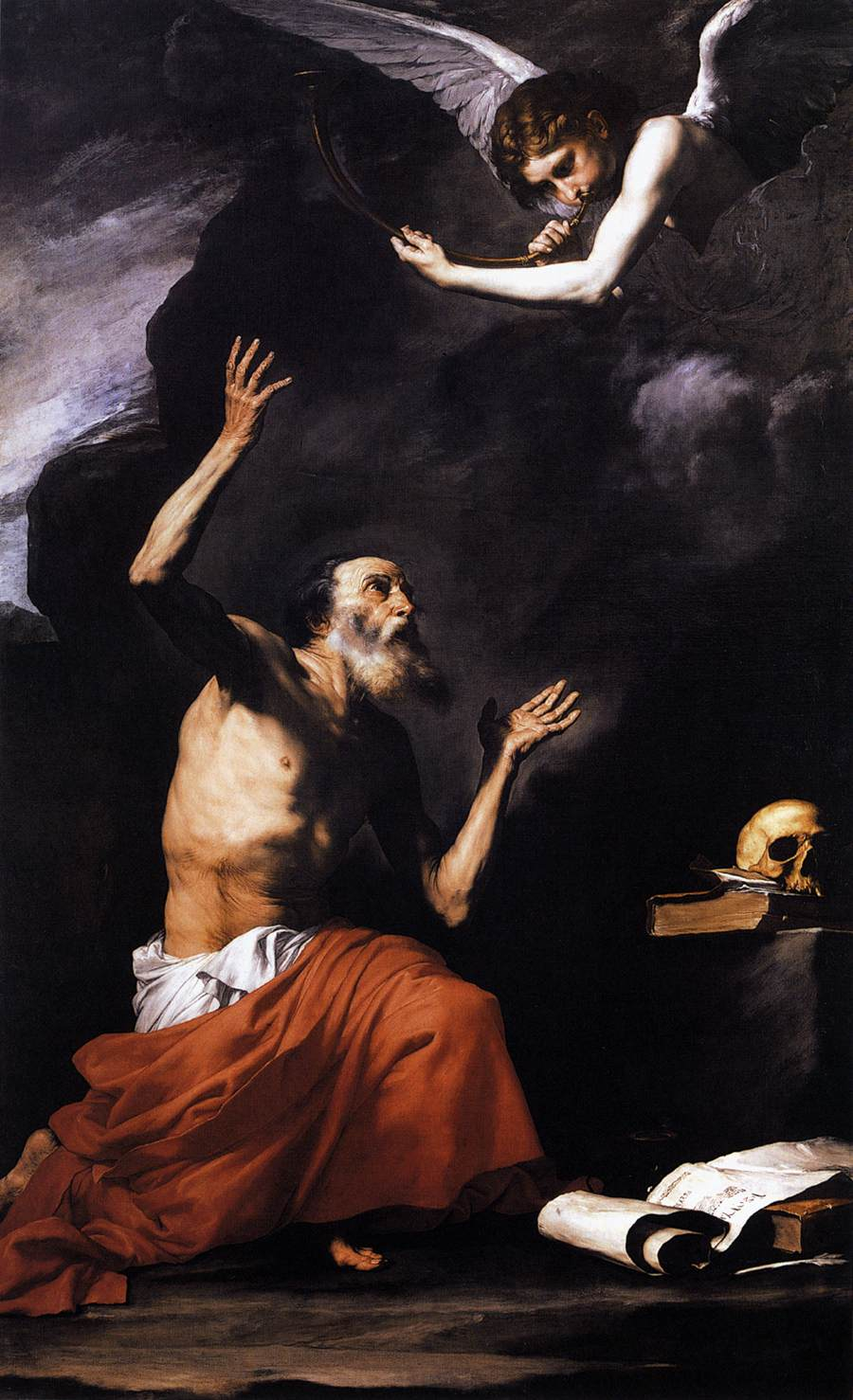
Saint Jerome and the Angel, 1626, 262 x 164 cm., Museo di Capodimonte

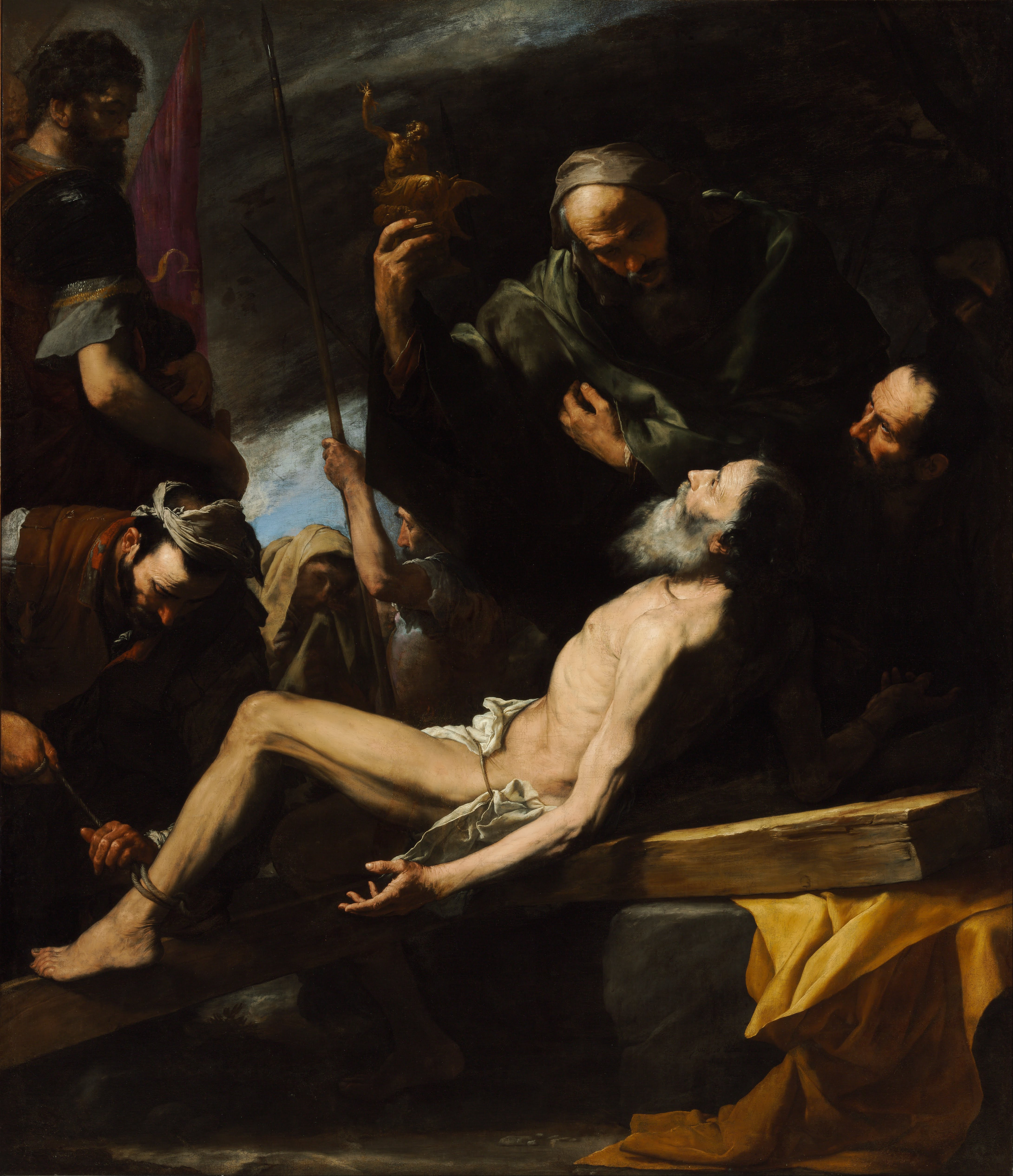
Martyrdom of Saint Andrew, 1628. 209 x 183 cm., Museum of Fine Arts (Budapest)

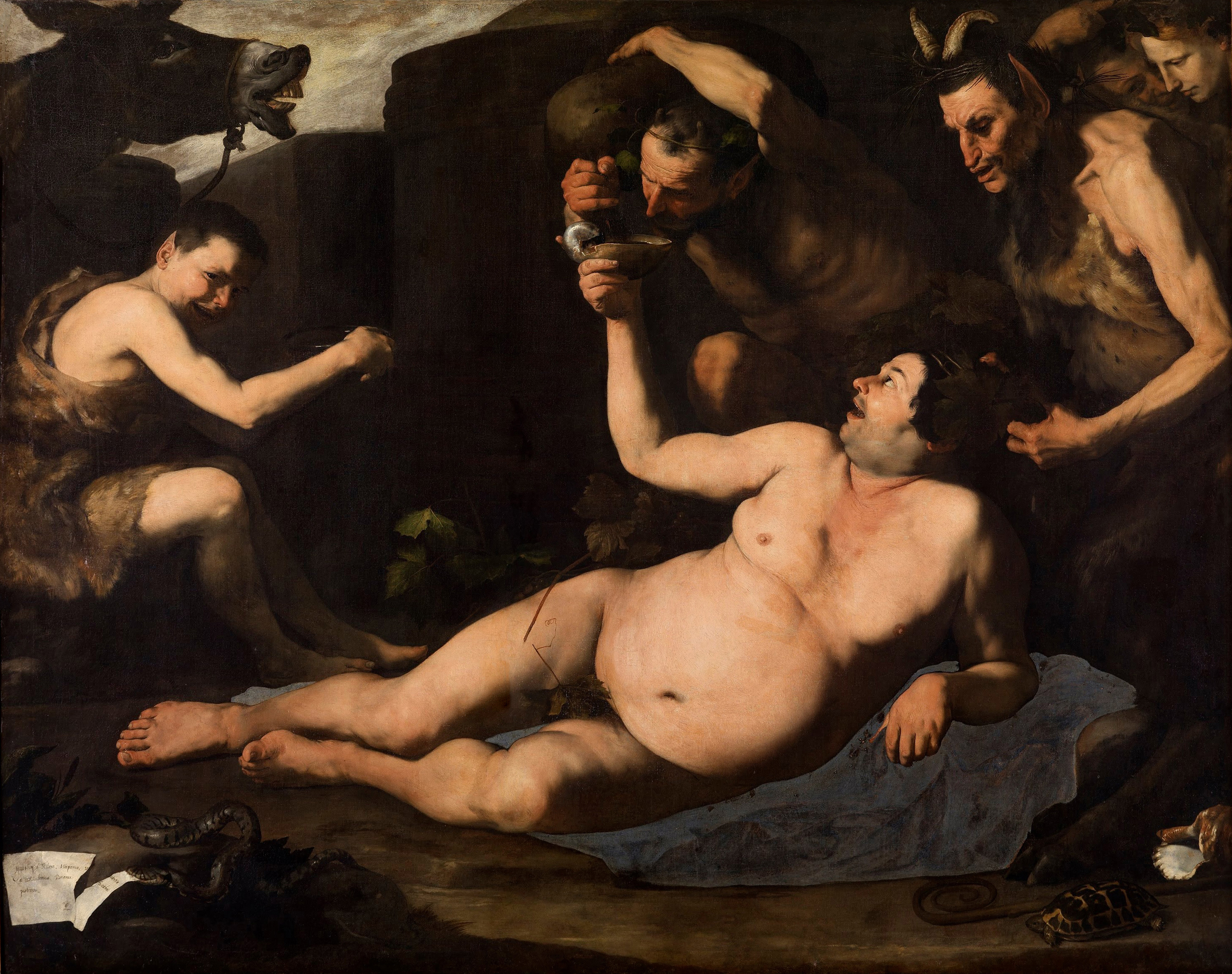
Drunken Silenus, 1626, 185 x 229 cm., Museo di Capodimonte

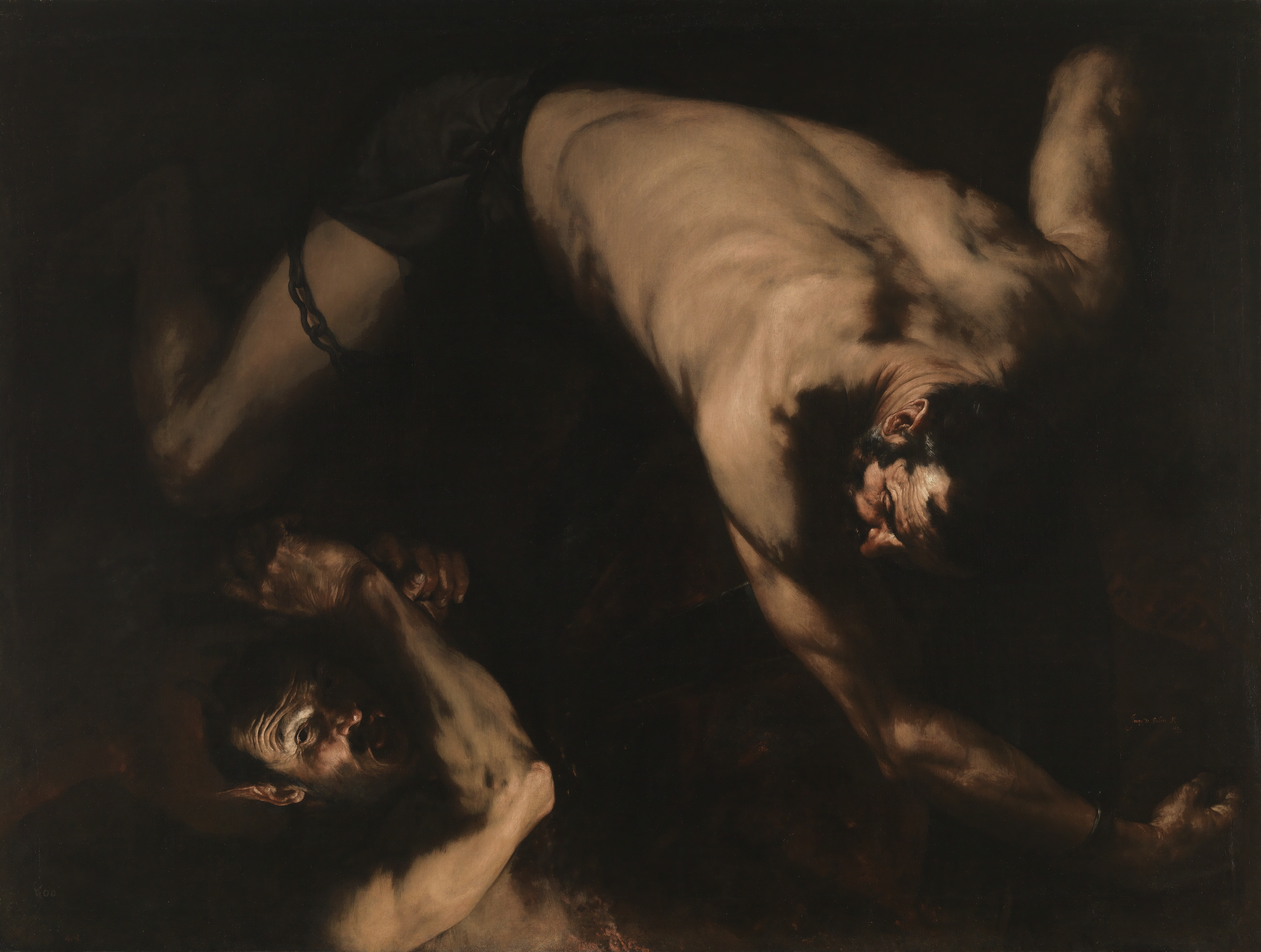
Ixion, 1632, 220 x 301 cm., Museo del Prado

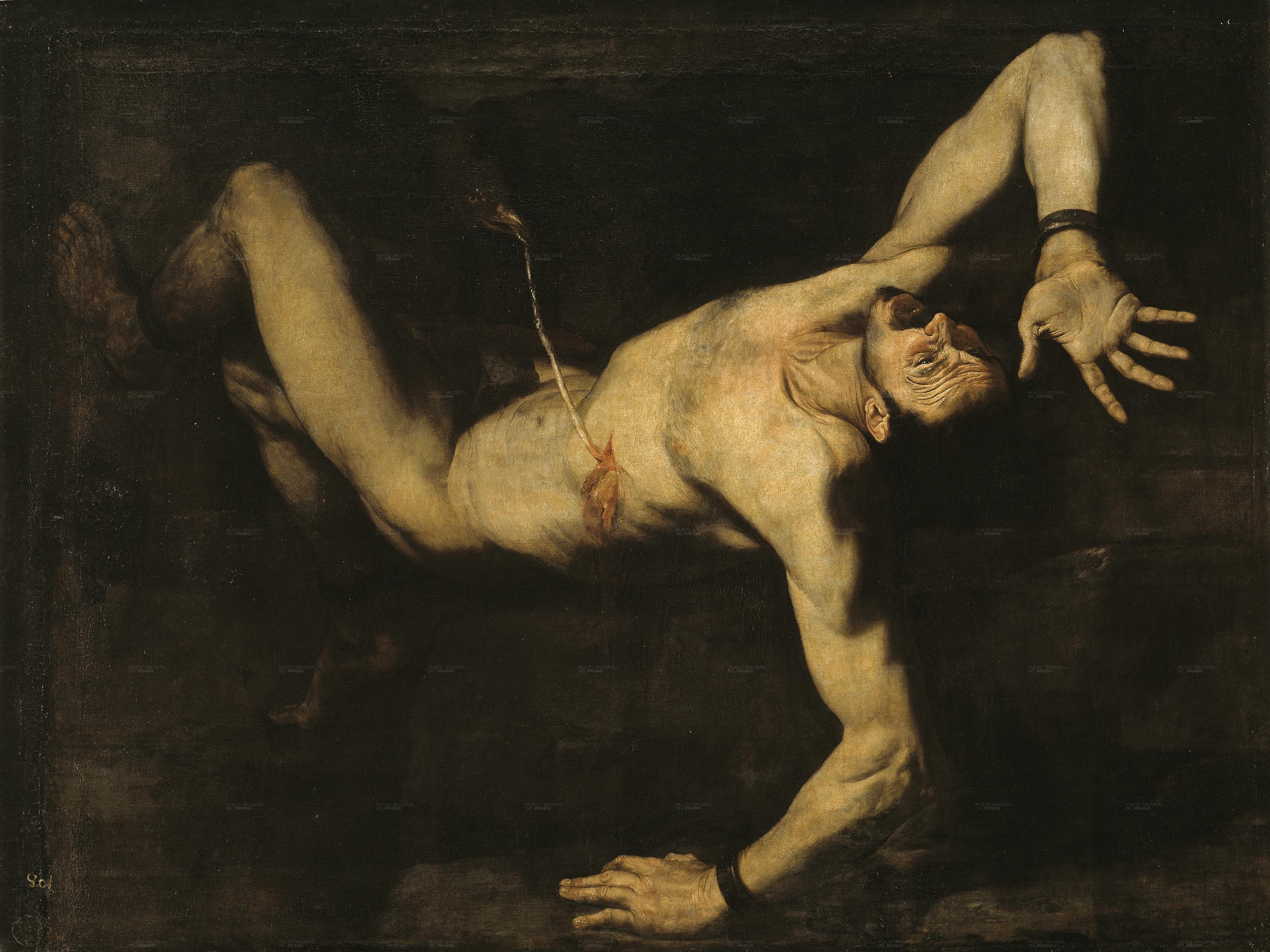
Tityos, 1632, 227 x 301 cm., Museo del Prado

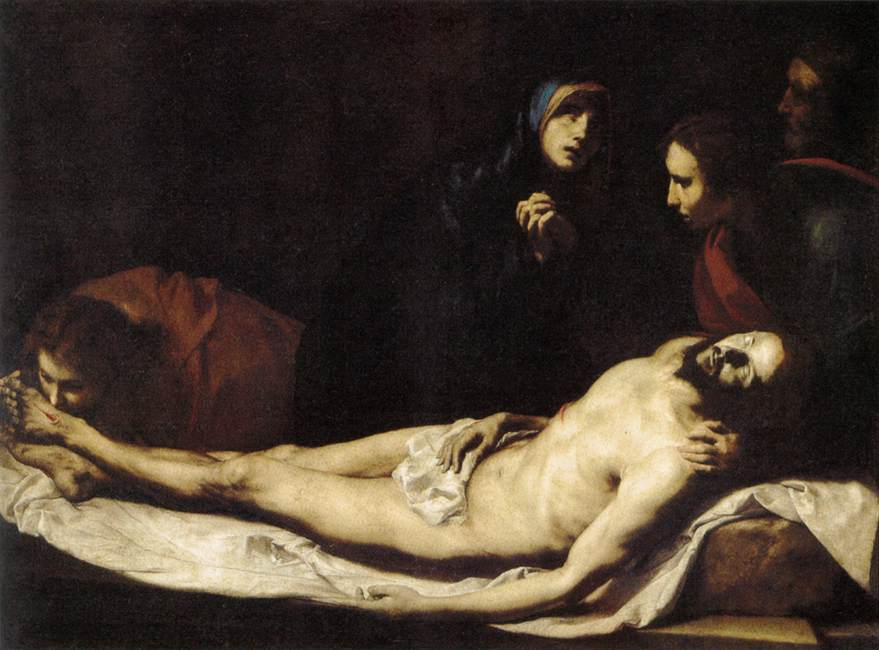
Pietà, 1633, 157 x 210 cm., Thyssen-Bornemisza Museum

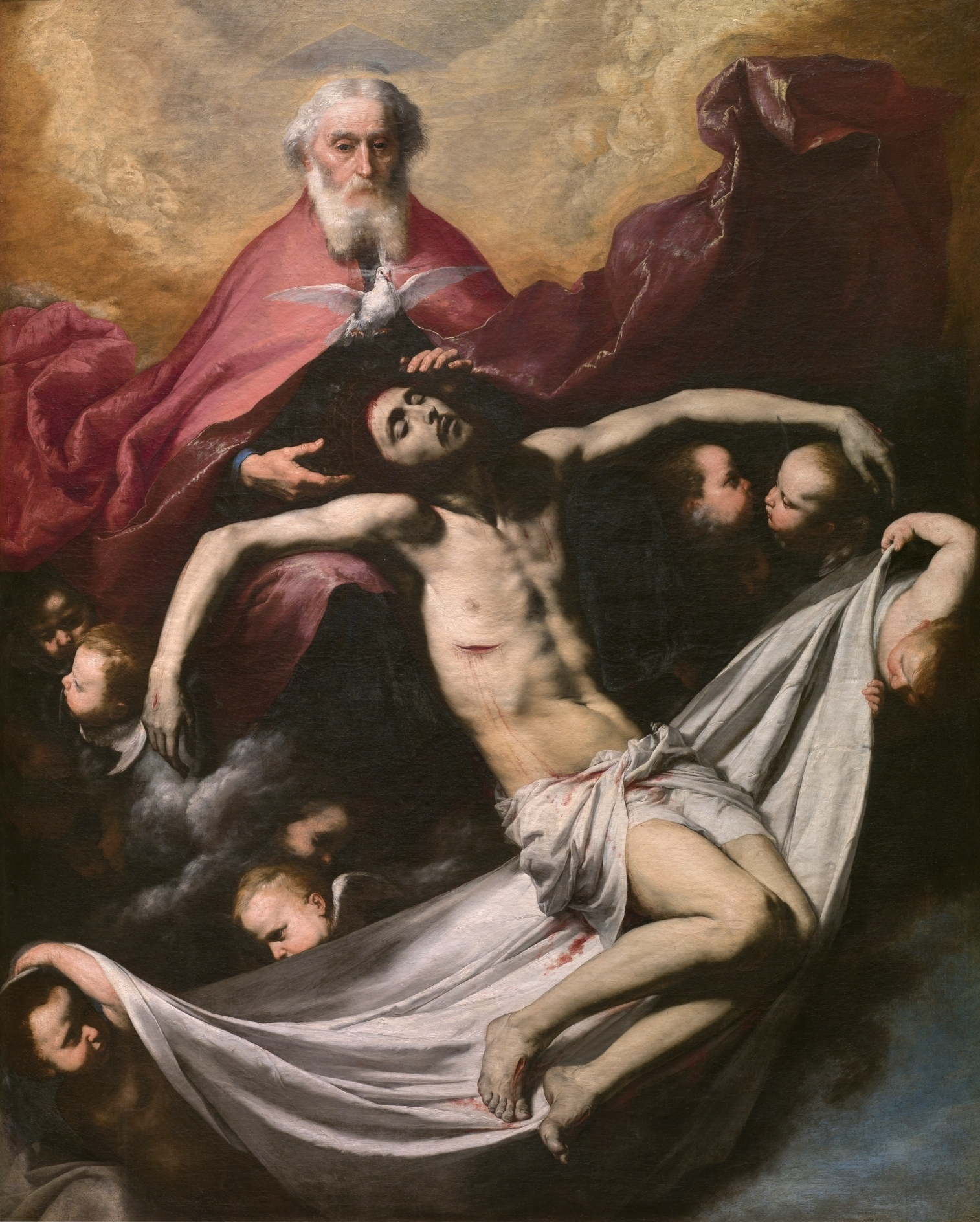
Trinity, 1635–36, 226 x 118, cm., Museo del Prado

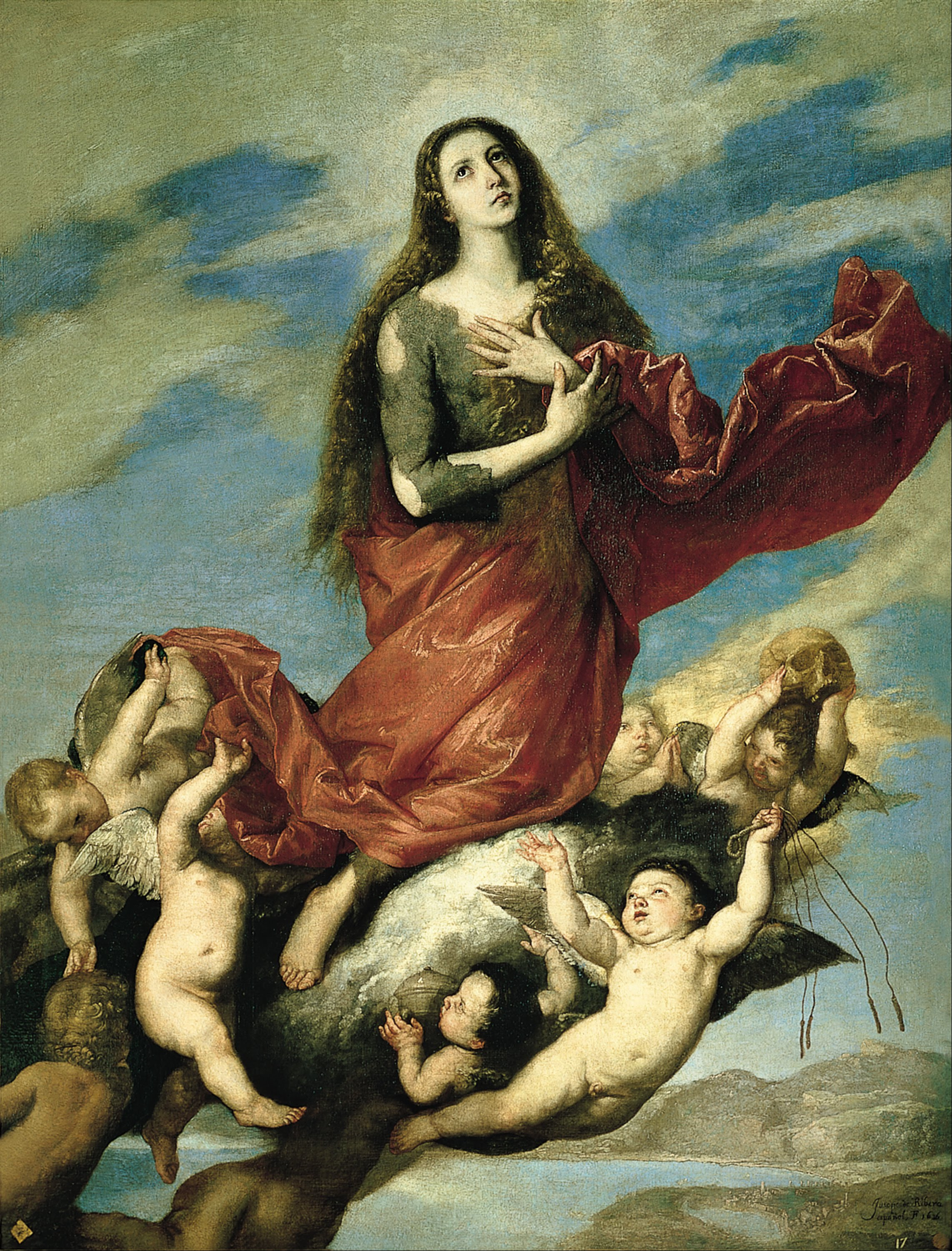
Assumption of Mary Magdalen, 1636, 256 x 193 cm., Real Academia de Bellas Artes de San Fernando

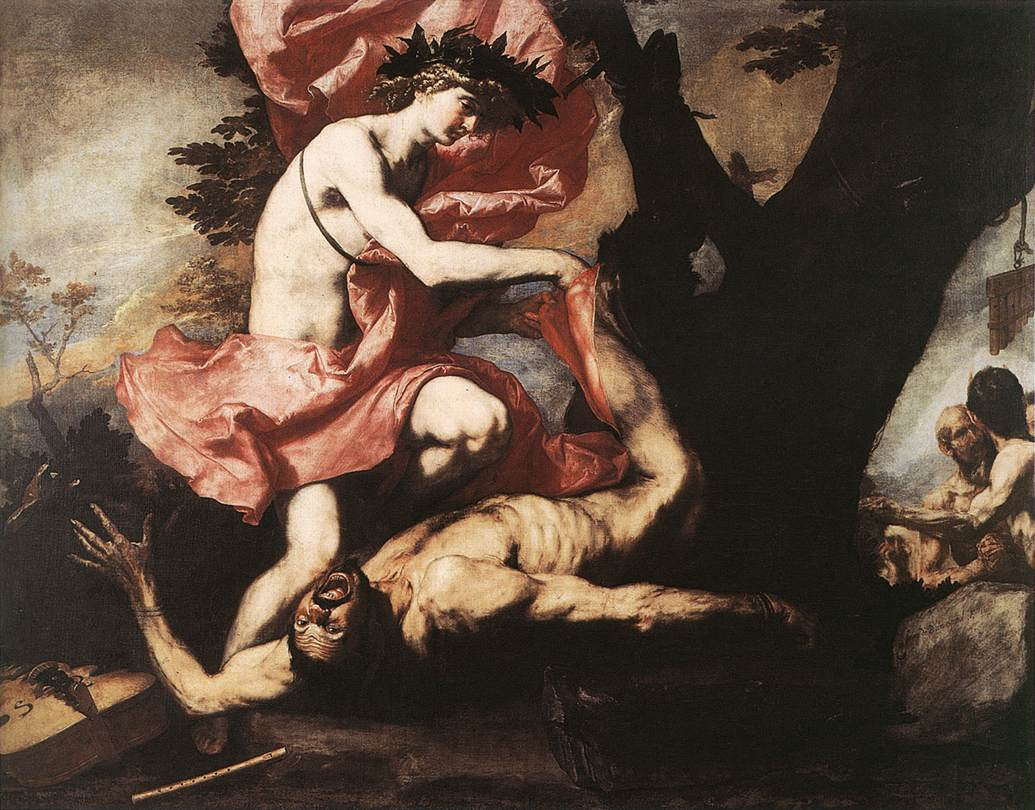
Apollo Flaying Marsyas, 1637, 202 x 255 cm., Royal Museums of Fine Arts of Belgium

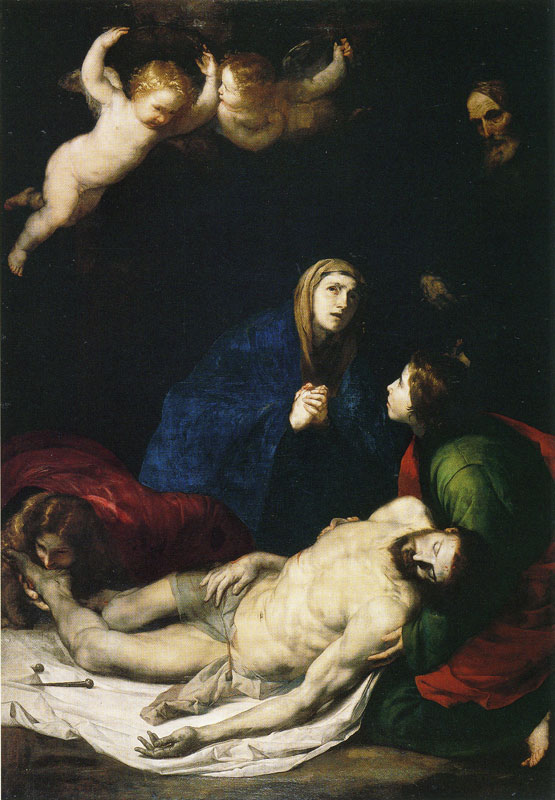
Pietà, 1637, 264 x 170 cm., National Museum of San Martino

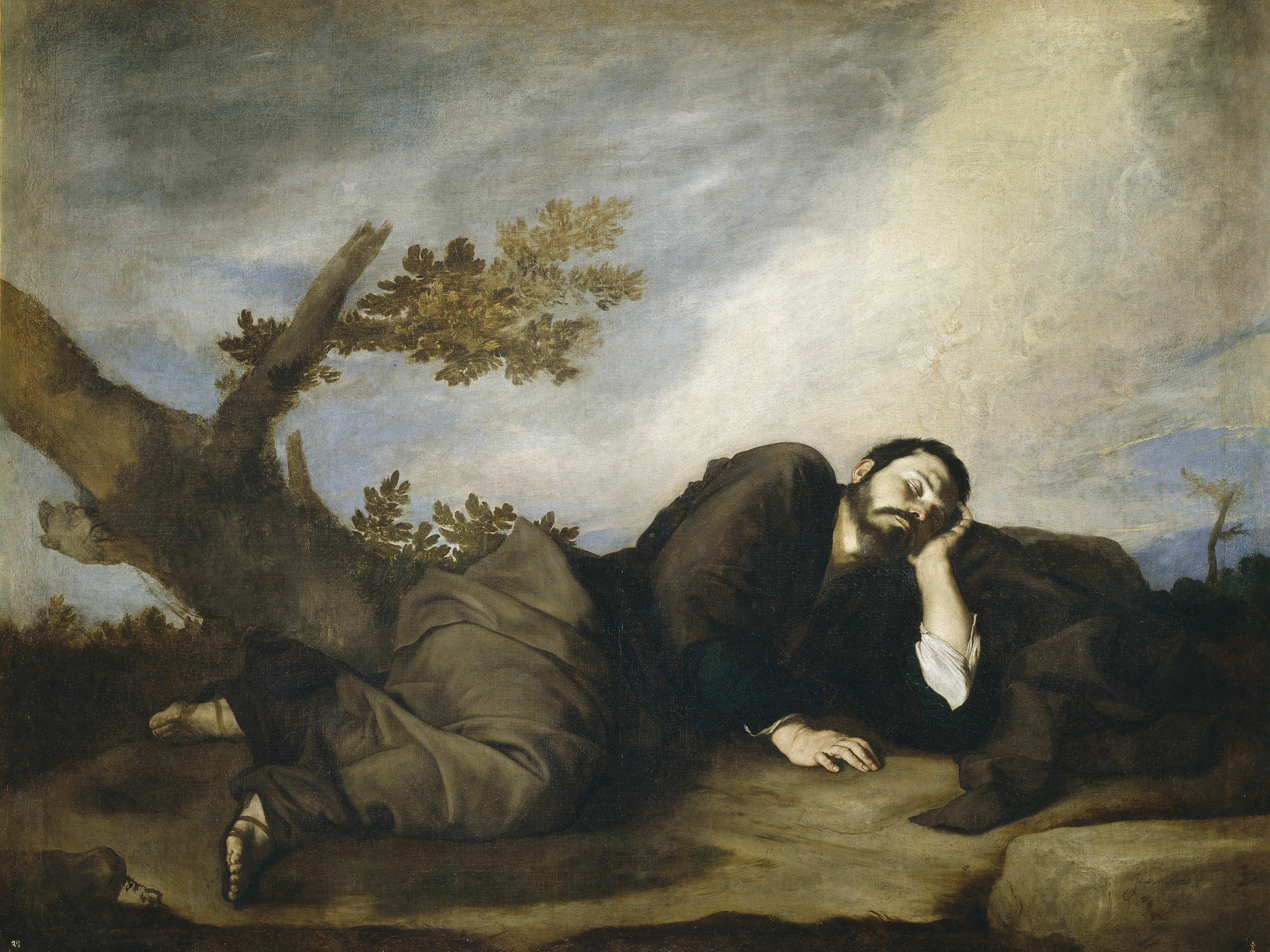
Jacob's Dream, 1639, 179 × 233 cm., Museo del Prado

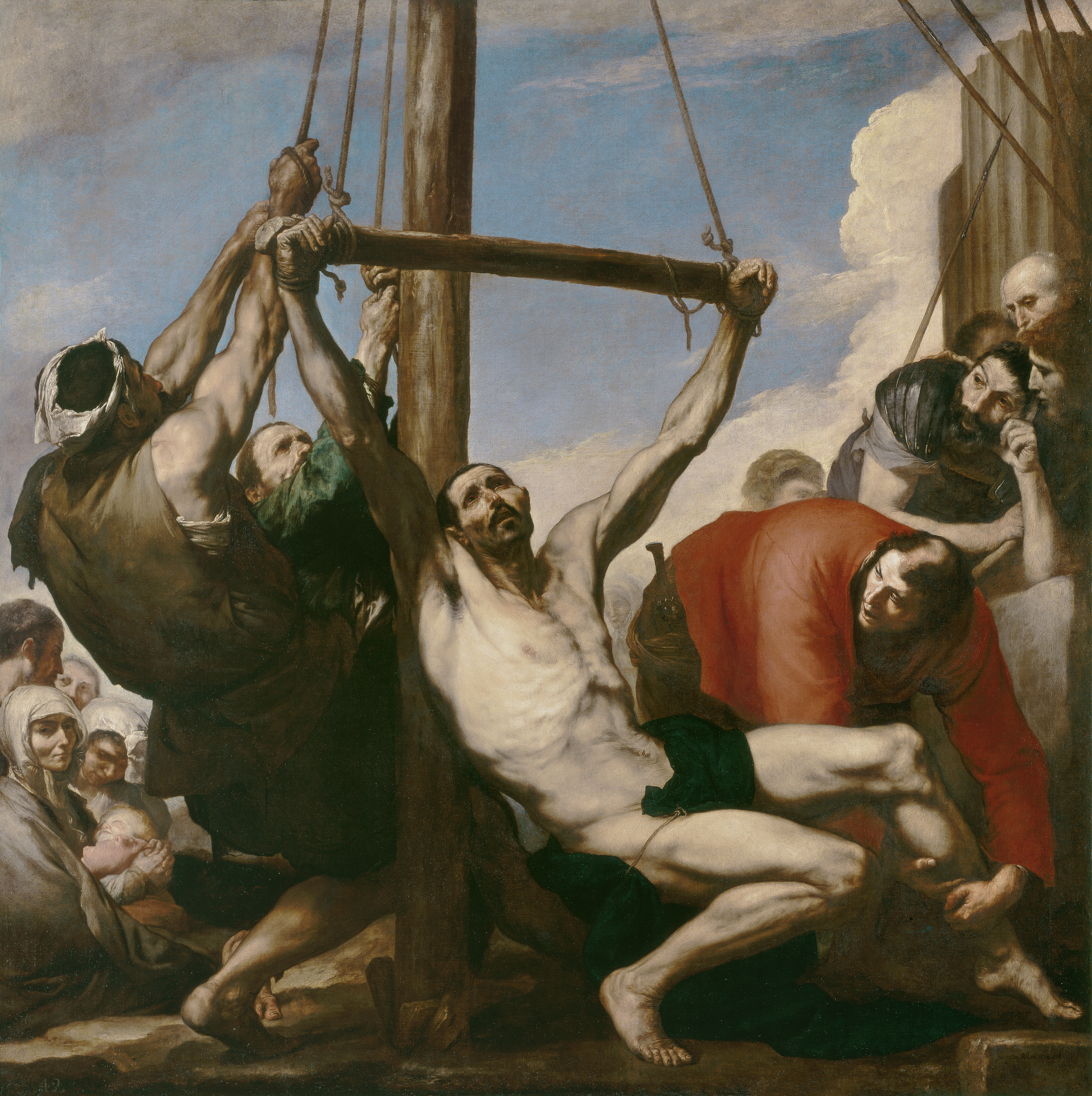
The Martyrdom of Saint Philip, 1639, 214 × 234 cm., Museo del Prado

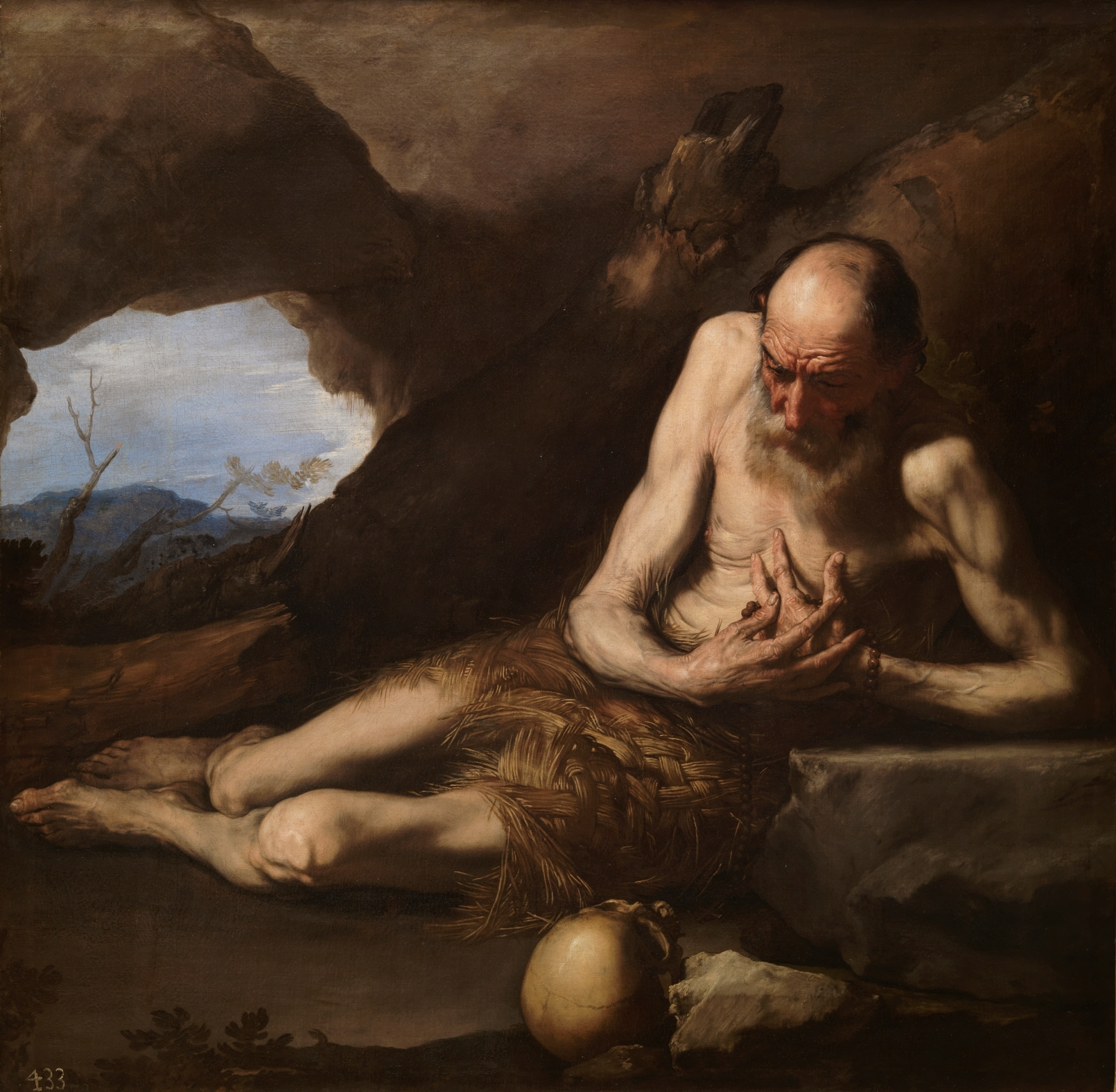
Saint Paul the Hermit, 1640, 143 × 143 cm., Museo del Prado

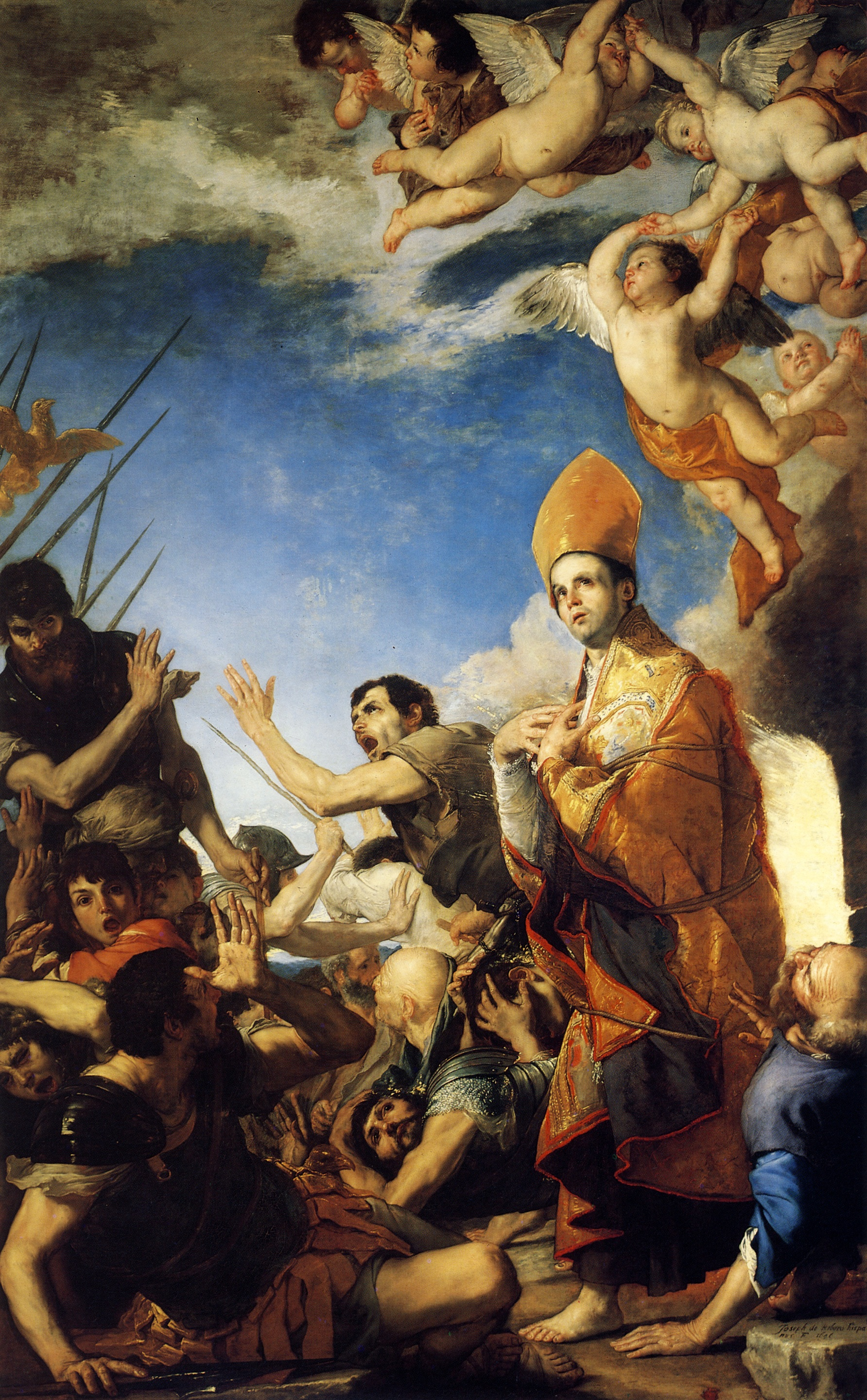
San Gennaro Emerging Unharmed from the Furnace, 1641-47 copper panel, 320 x 200 cm., Royal Chapel of the Treasure of St. Januarius

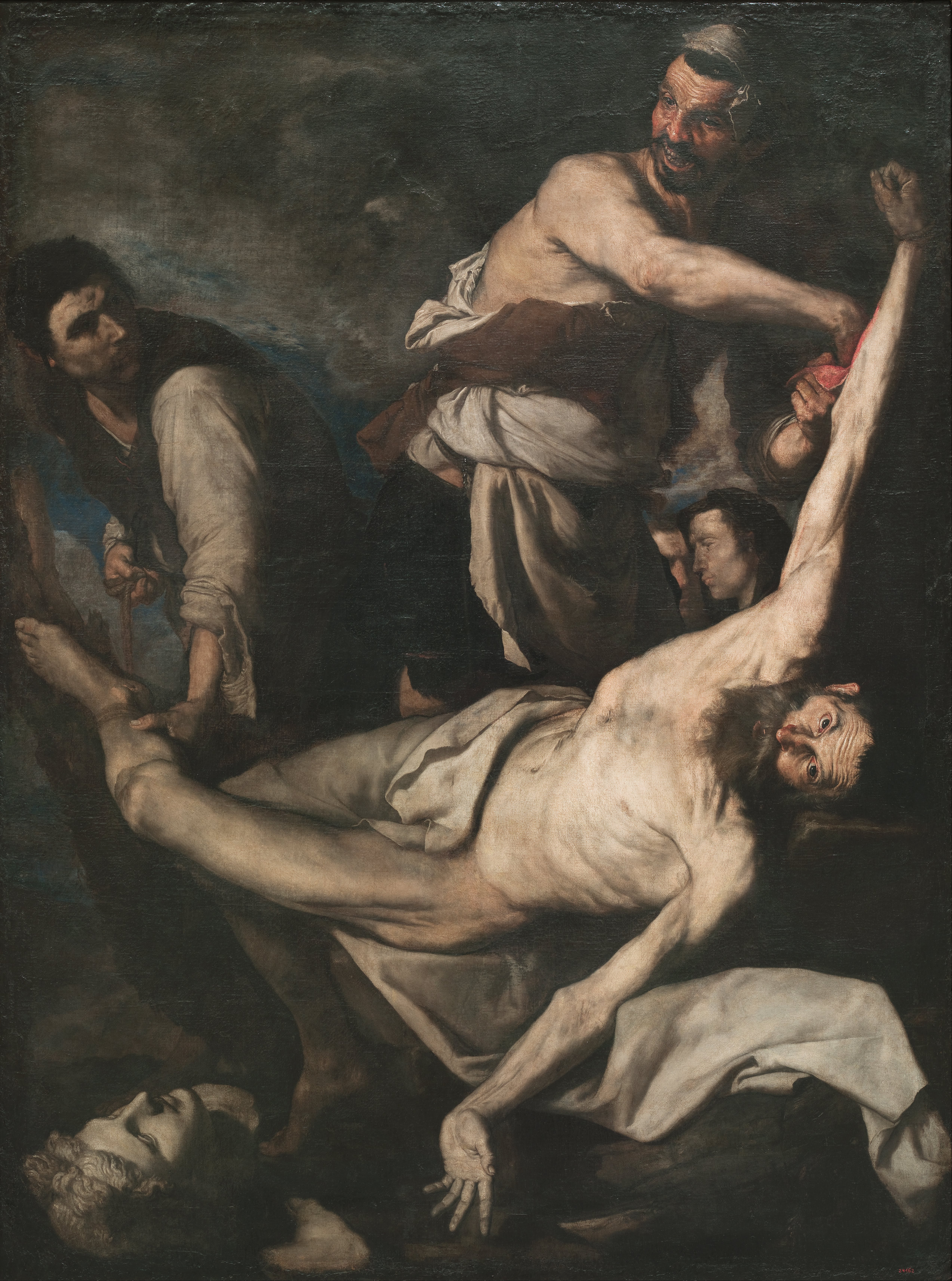
Martyrdom of Saint Bartholomew, 1644, 202 x 153 cm., Museu Nacional d'Art de Catalunya

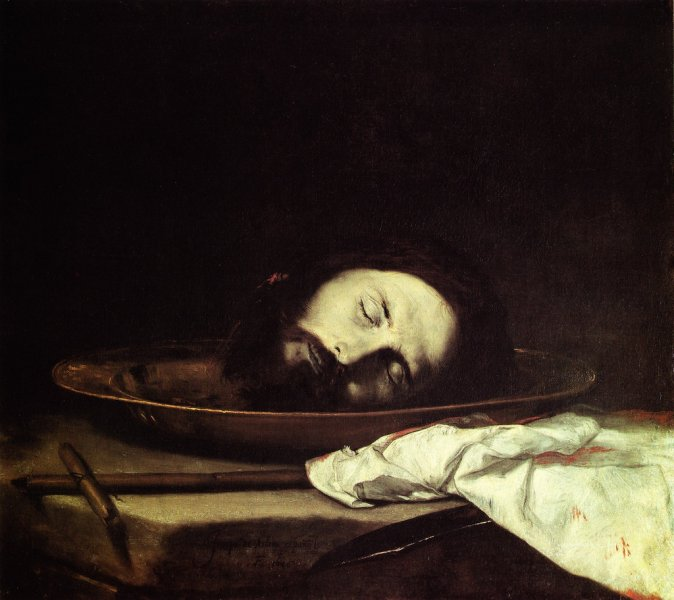
Head of John the Baptist. 1646, 66 × 78 cm., Museo Civico Filangieri

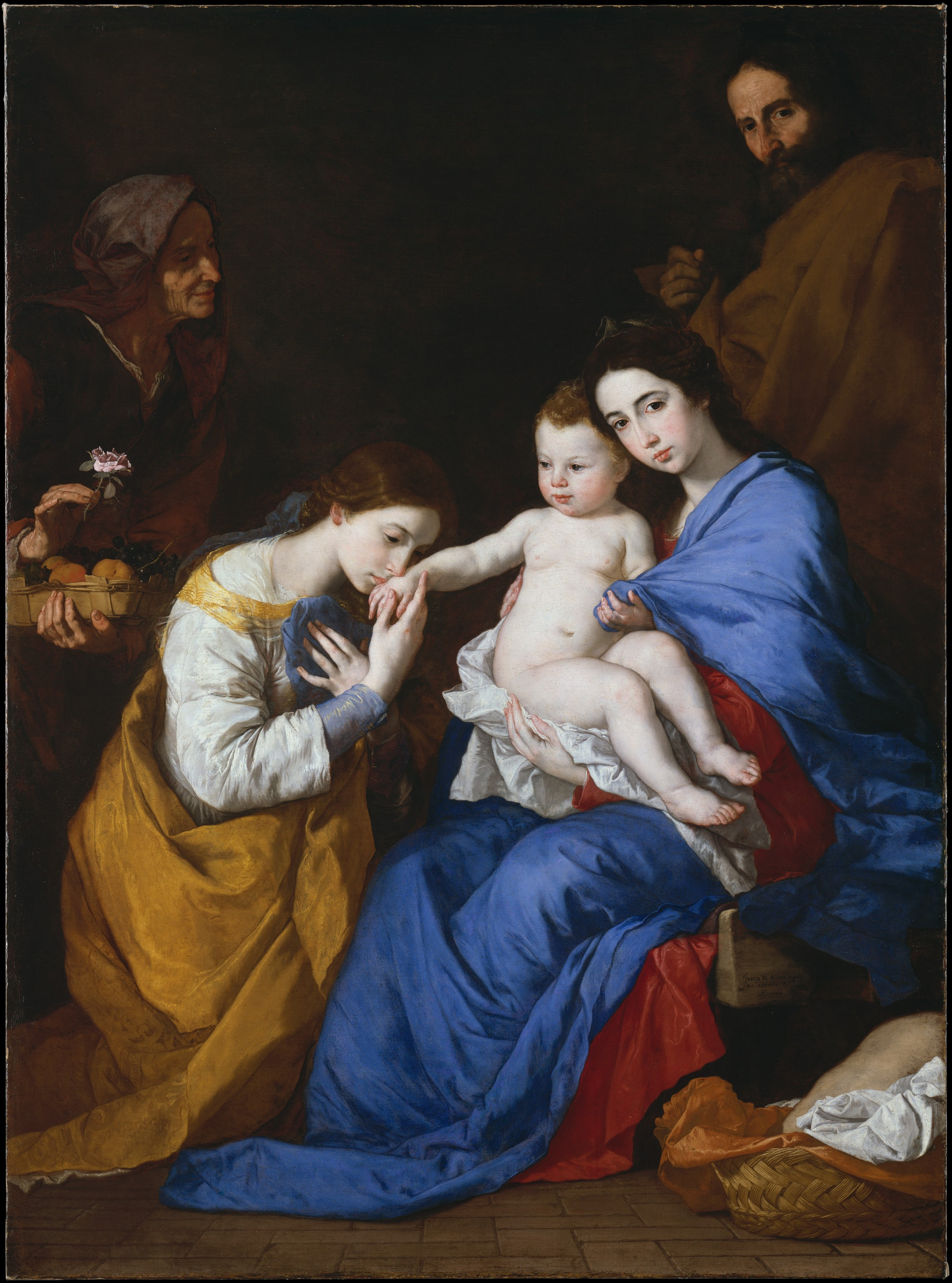
The Holy Family with Saint Anne and Catherine of Alexandria, 1648, 209.6 x 154.3 cm., Metropolitan Museum of Art

Allegories, philosophers, apostles and saints

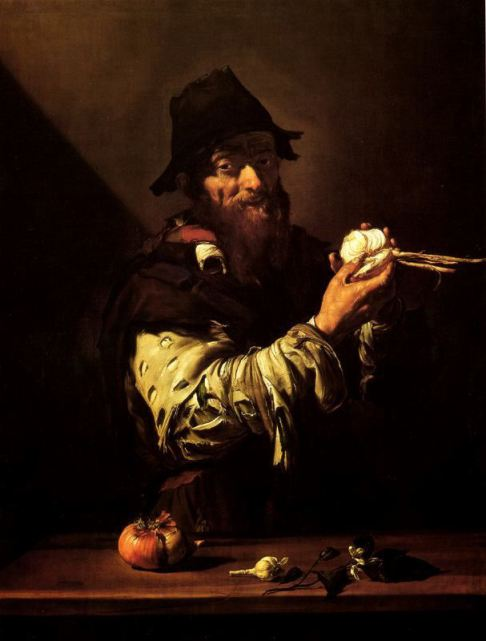
Allegory of Smell, ca. 1611–16, 115 x 88 cm., private collection

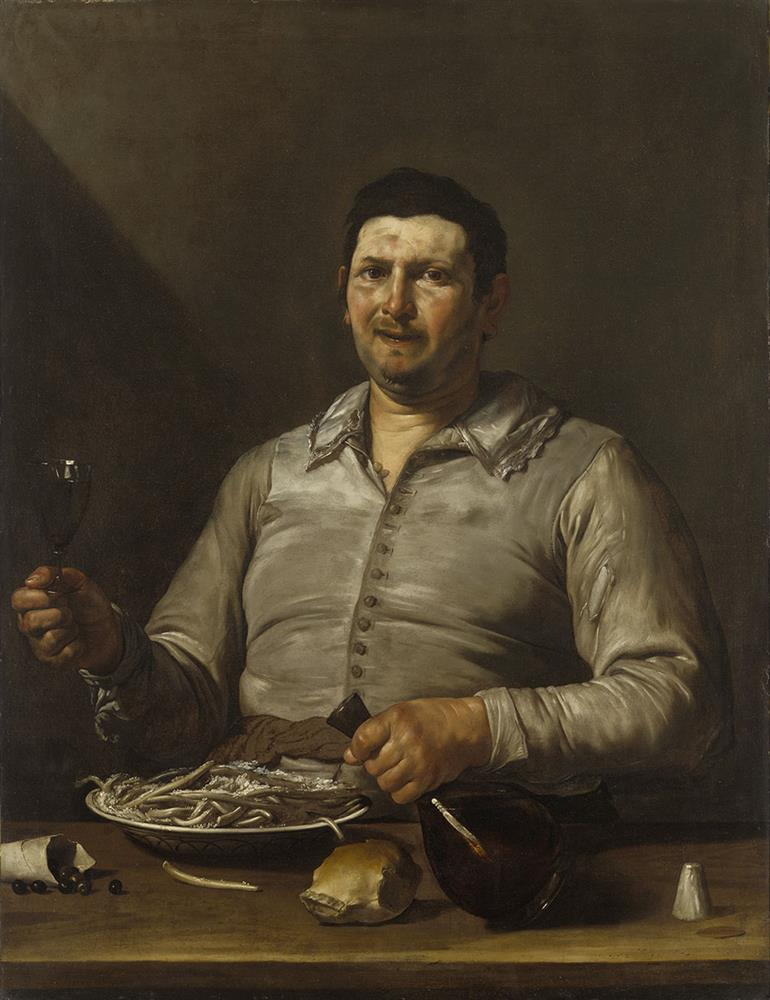
Allegory of Taste, ca. 1611–16, 113.5 x 88.3 cm., Wadsworth Atheneum

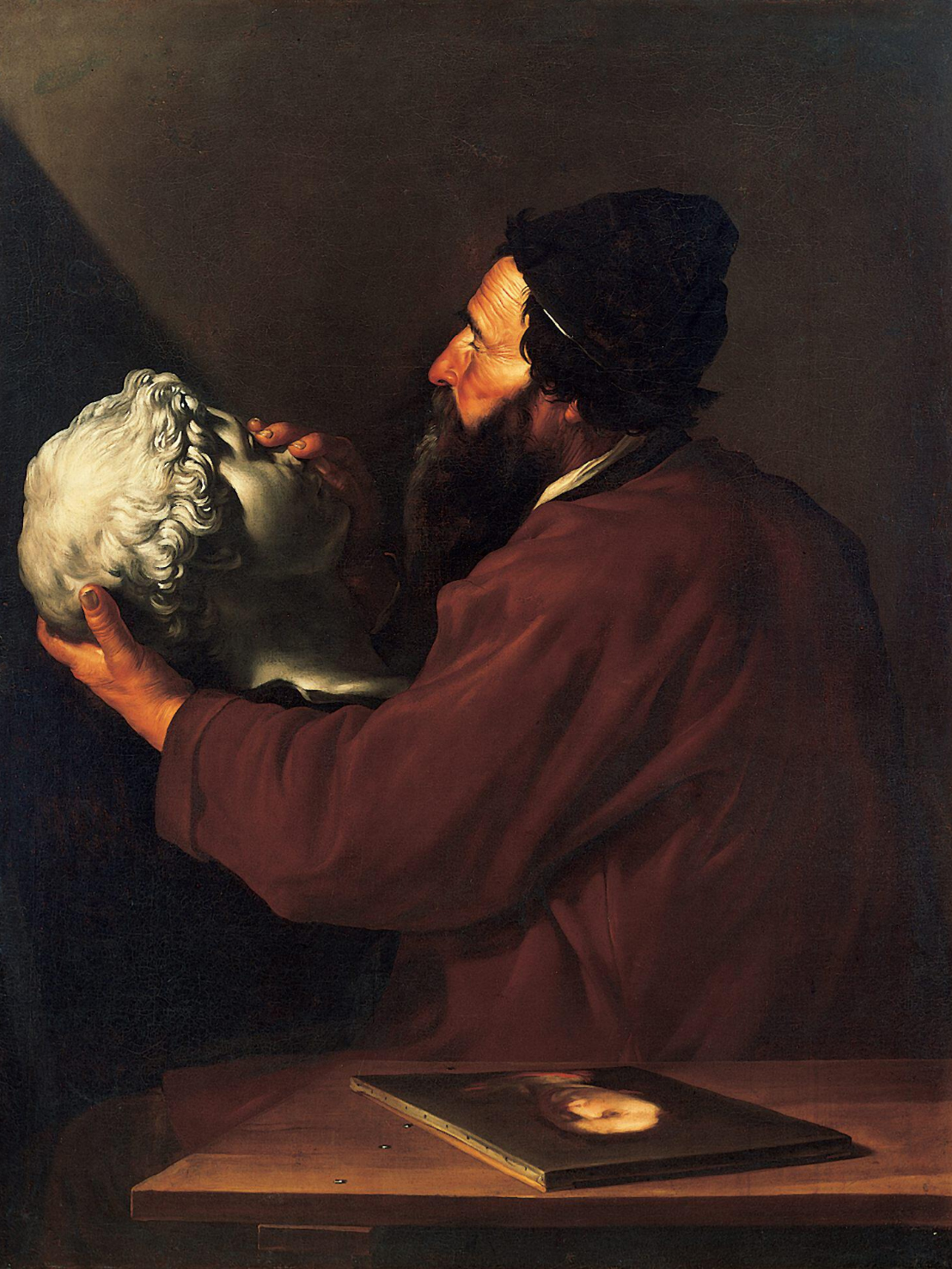
Allegory of Touch, ca. 1611–16, 116 x: 88.3 cm., Norton Simon Museum

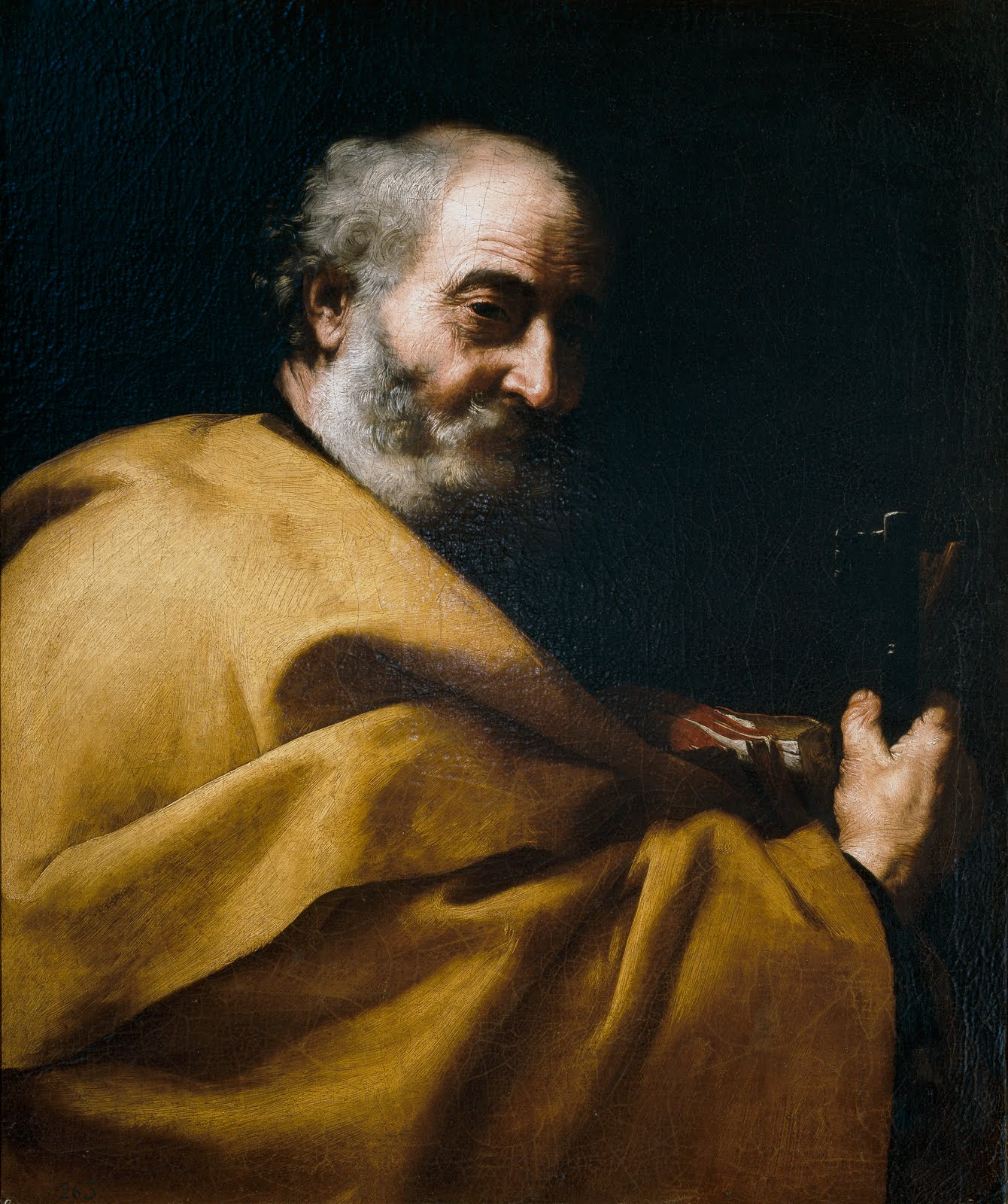
Apostle, Saint Peter, 1630–1635, 75 x 64 cm., Museo del Prado

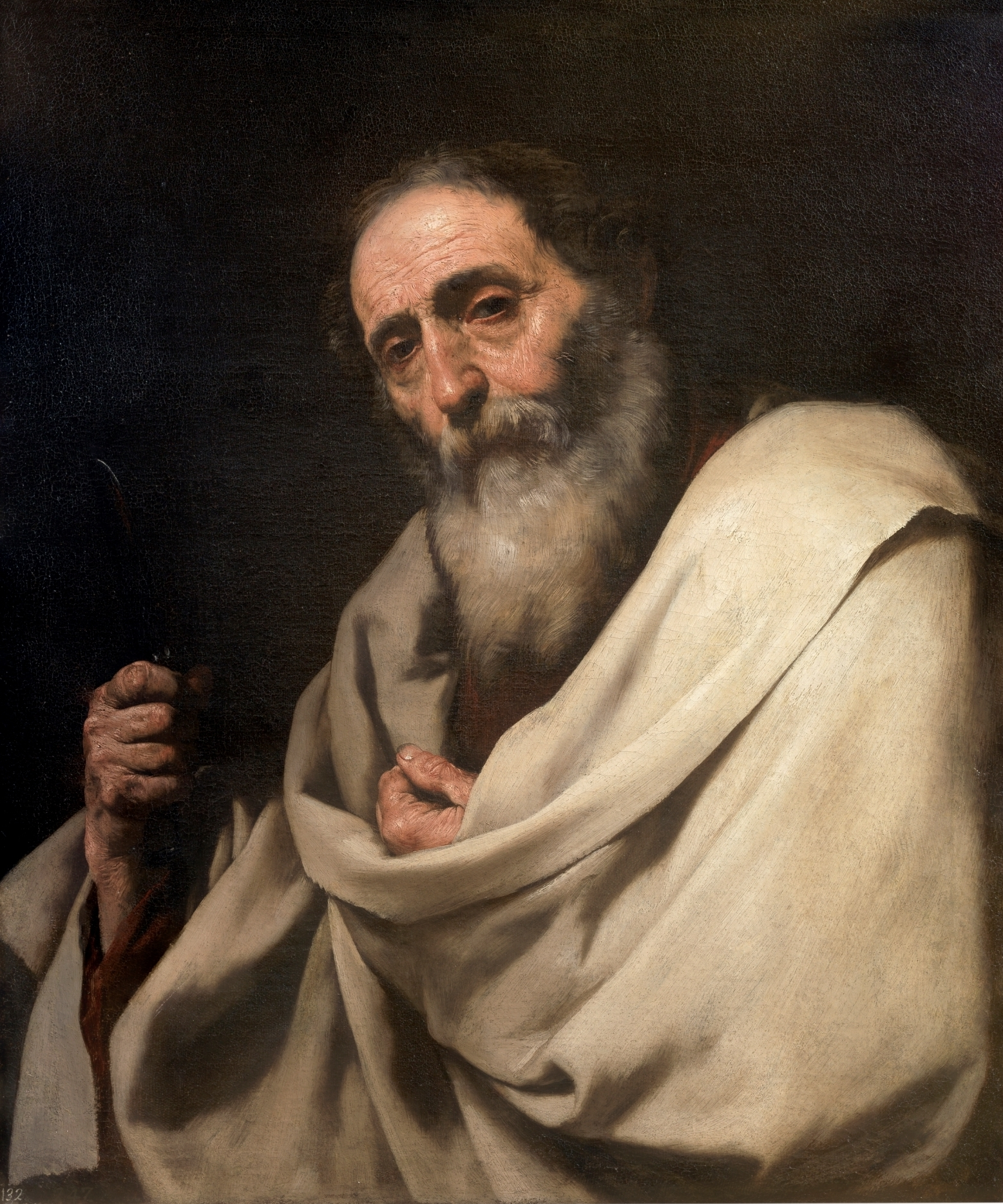
Apostle, Saint Bartholomew, 1630–1635, 77 x 64 cm., Museo del Prado

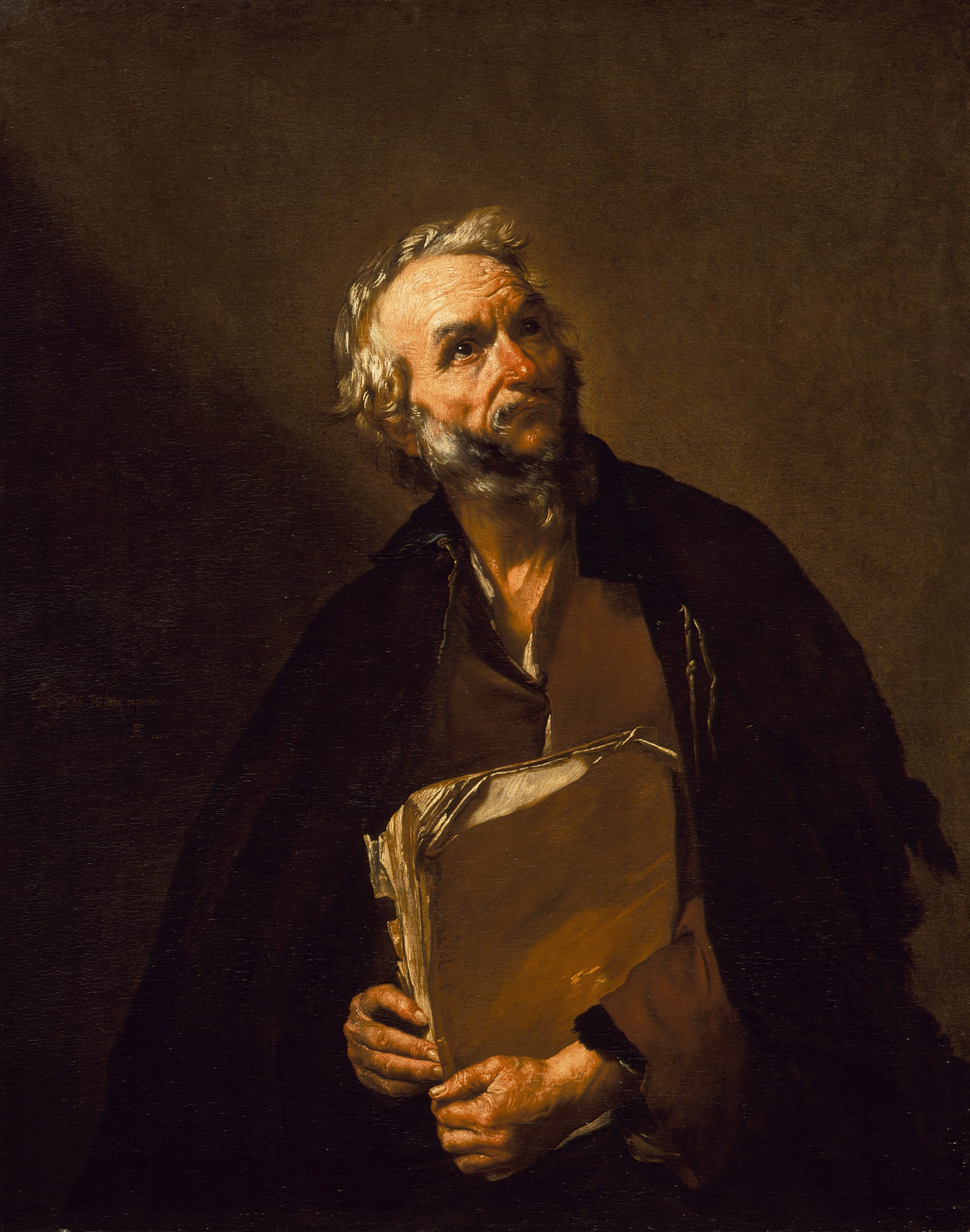
Philosopher (Plato), 1637, 124.4 x 99 cm., Los Angeles County Museum of Art

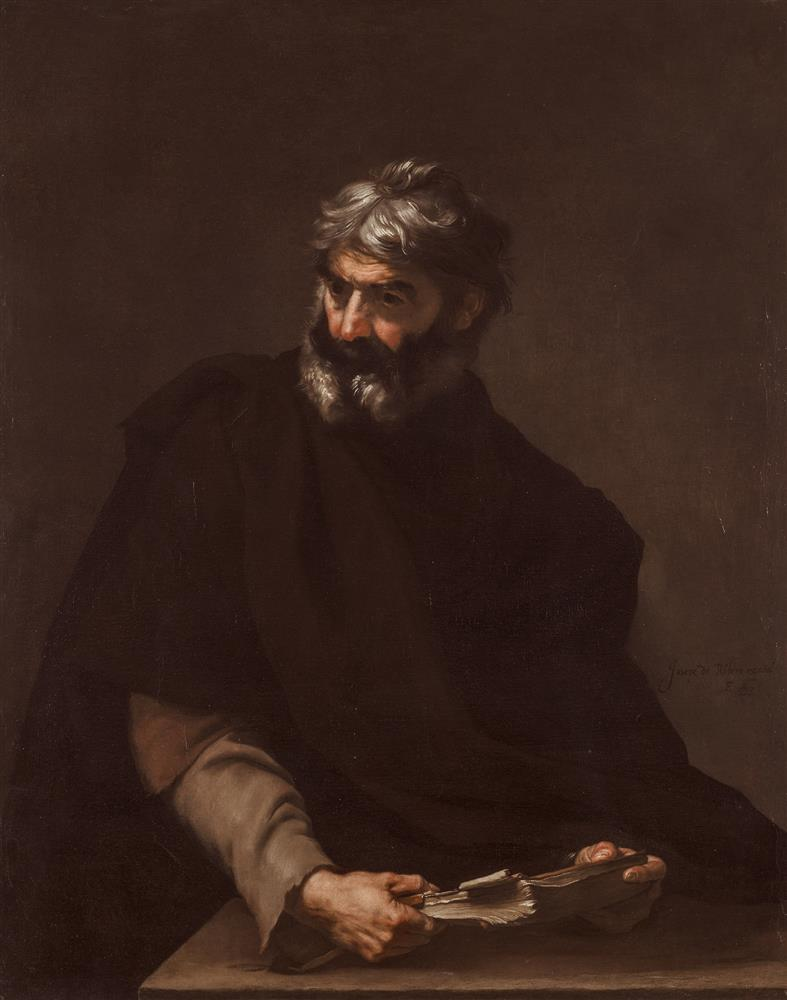
Philosopher (Protagoras), 1637, 124.1 x 98.4 cm., Wadsworth Atheneum

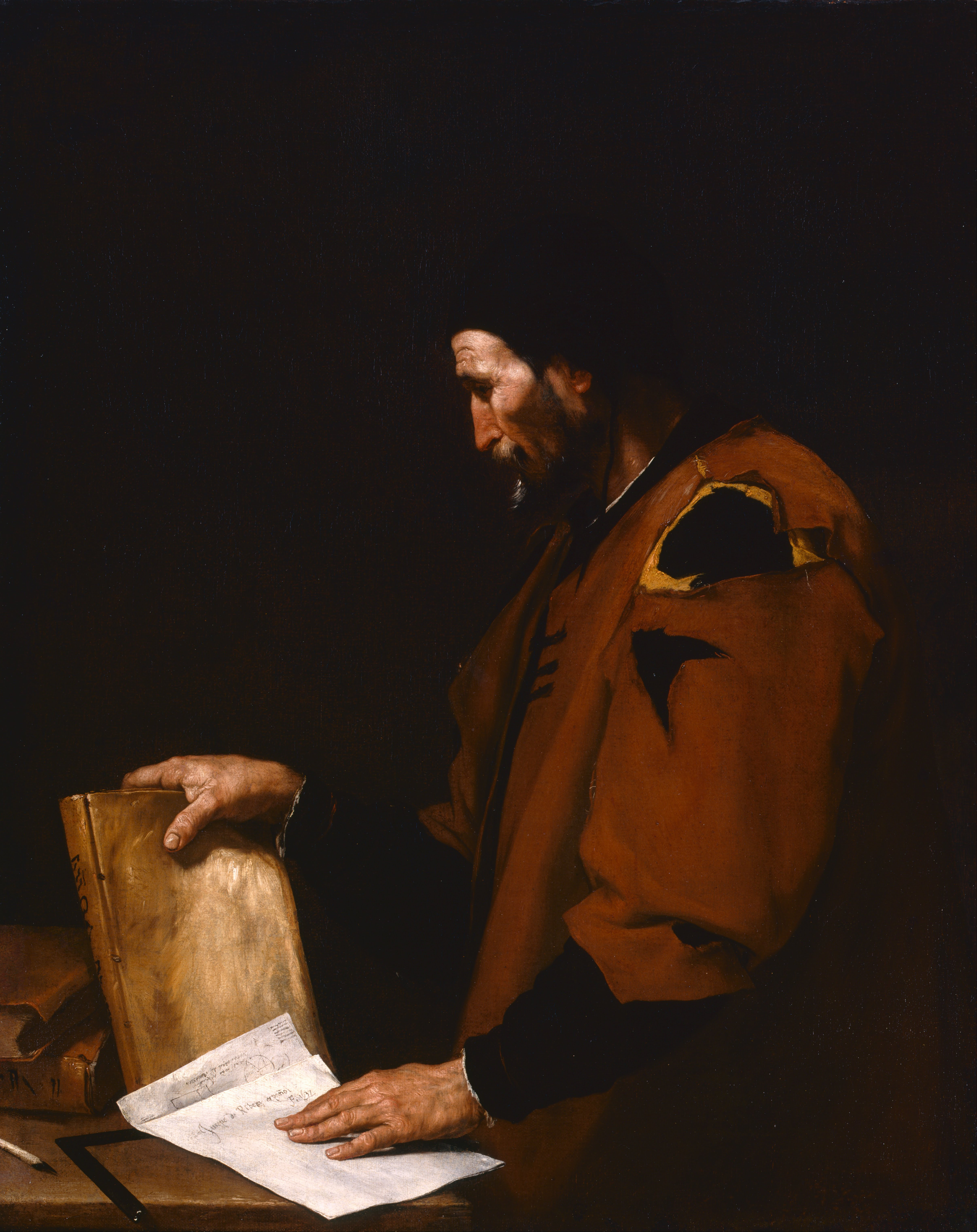
Philosopher (Aristotle), 1637, 124.4 x 99 cm., Indianapolis Museum of Art

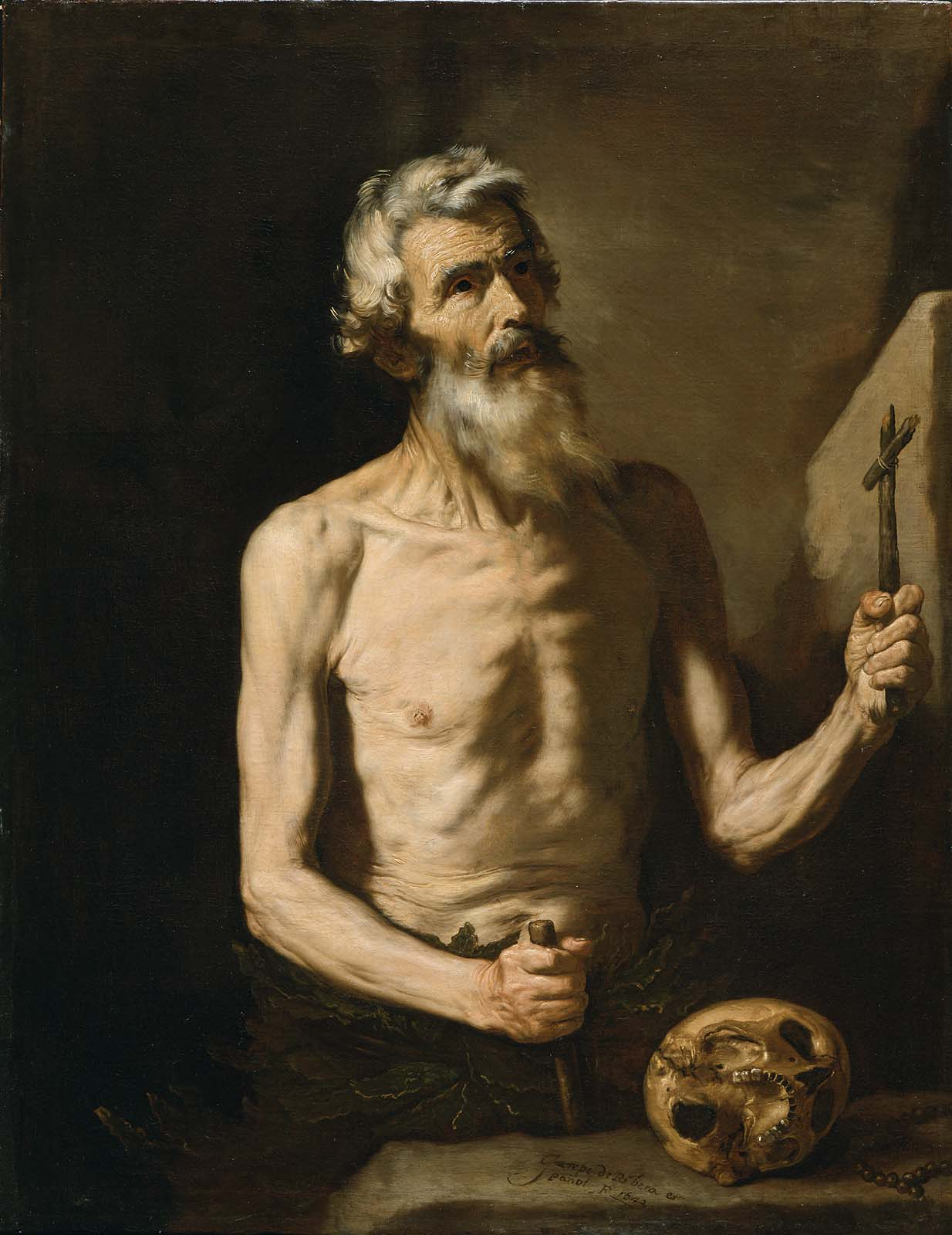
Saint Onophrius, 1642, 129.5 x 101.3 cm., Museum of Fine Arts, Boston

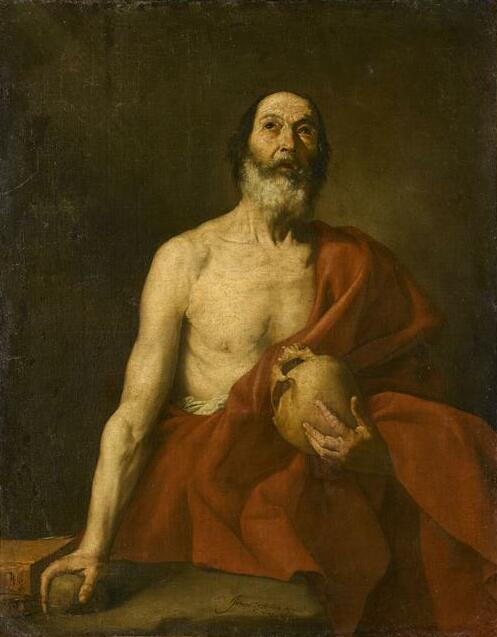
Saint Jerome in Penitence, no date, 128 x 102 cm., Louvre

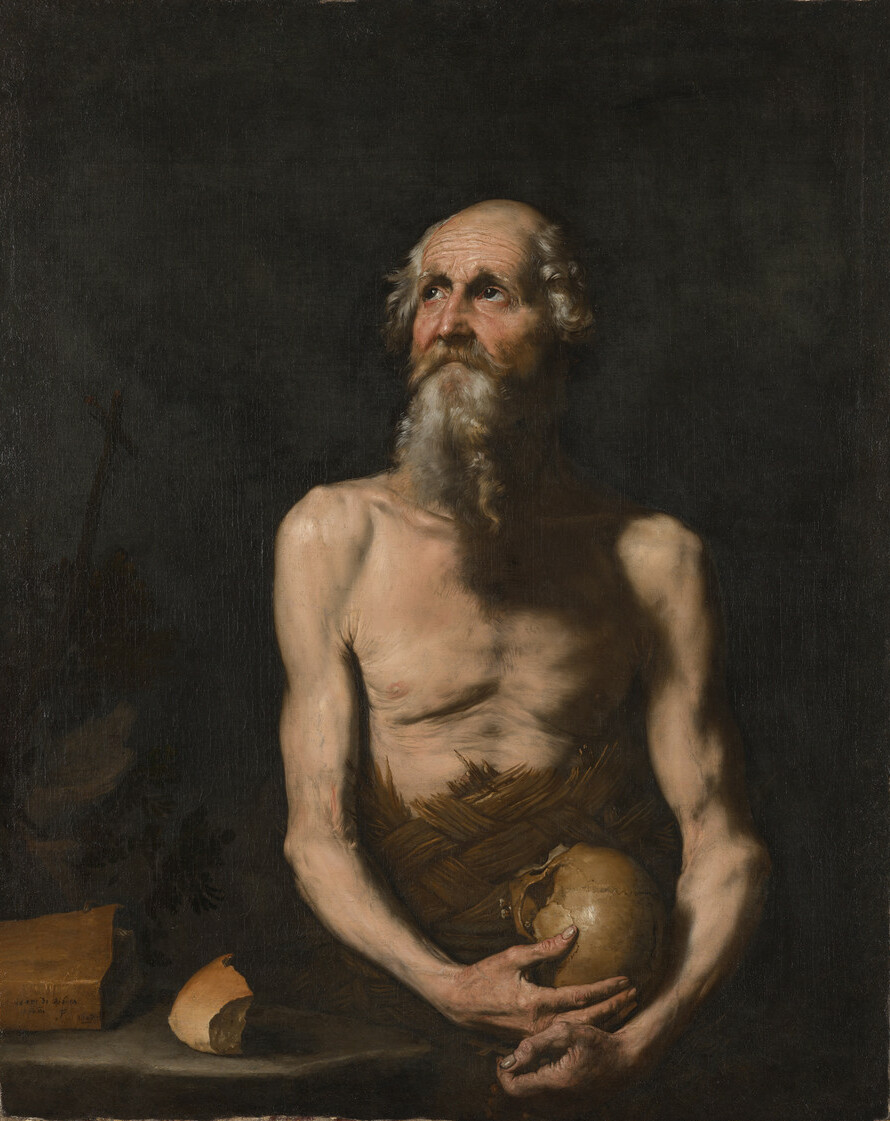
Saint Paul the Hermit, 1647, 130 x 103.5 cm, Wallraf–Richartz Museum

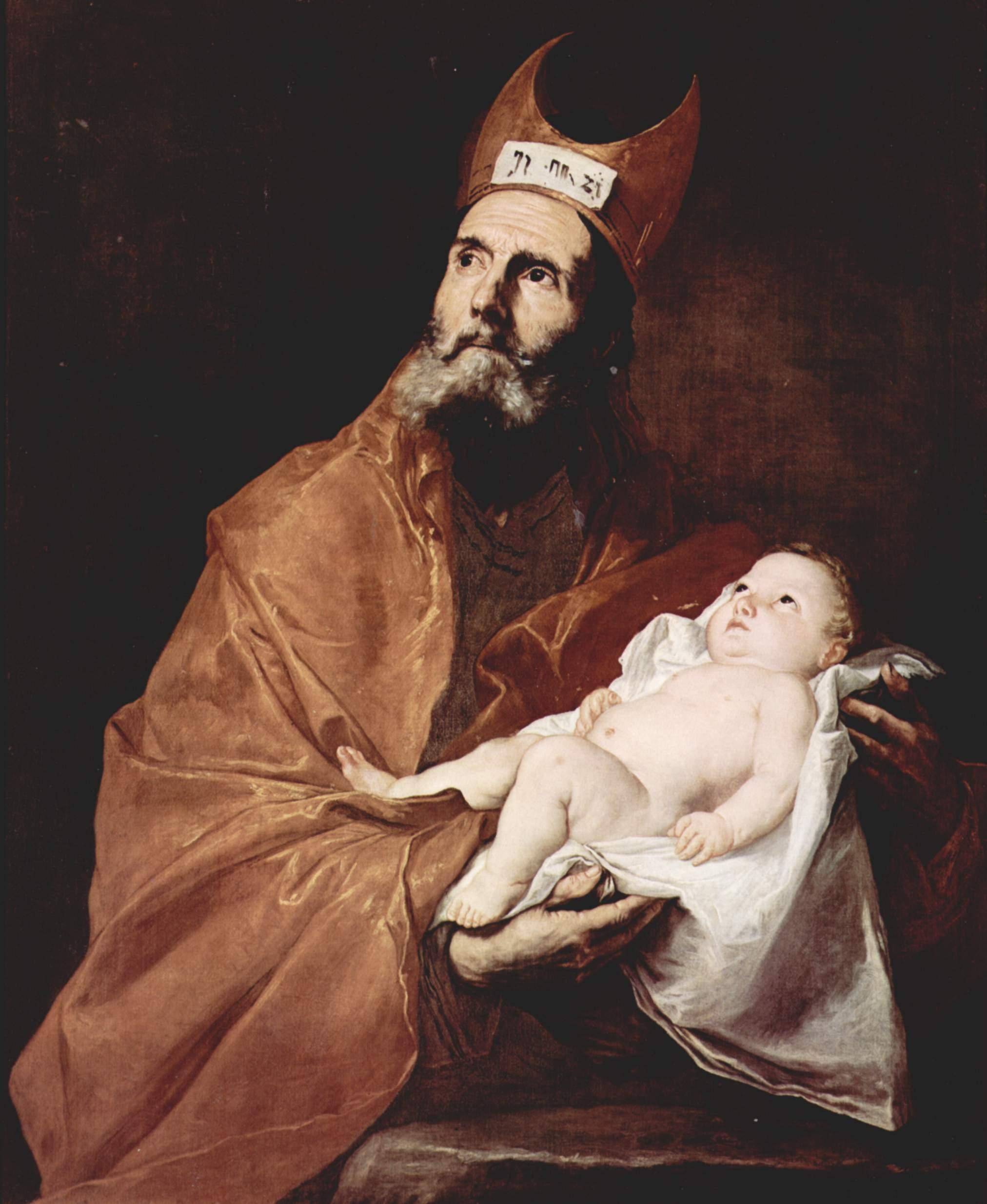
Saint Simeon with the Infant Jesus, 1647, 113 x 93 cm., private collection

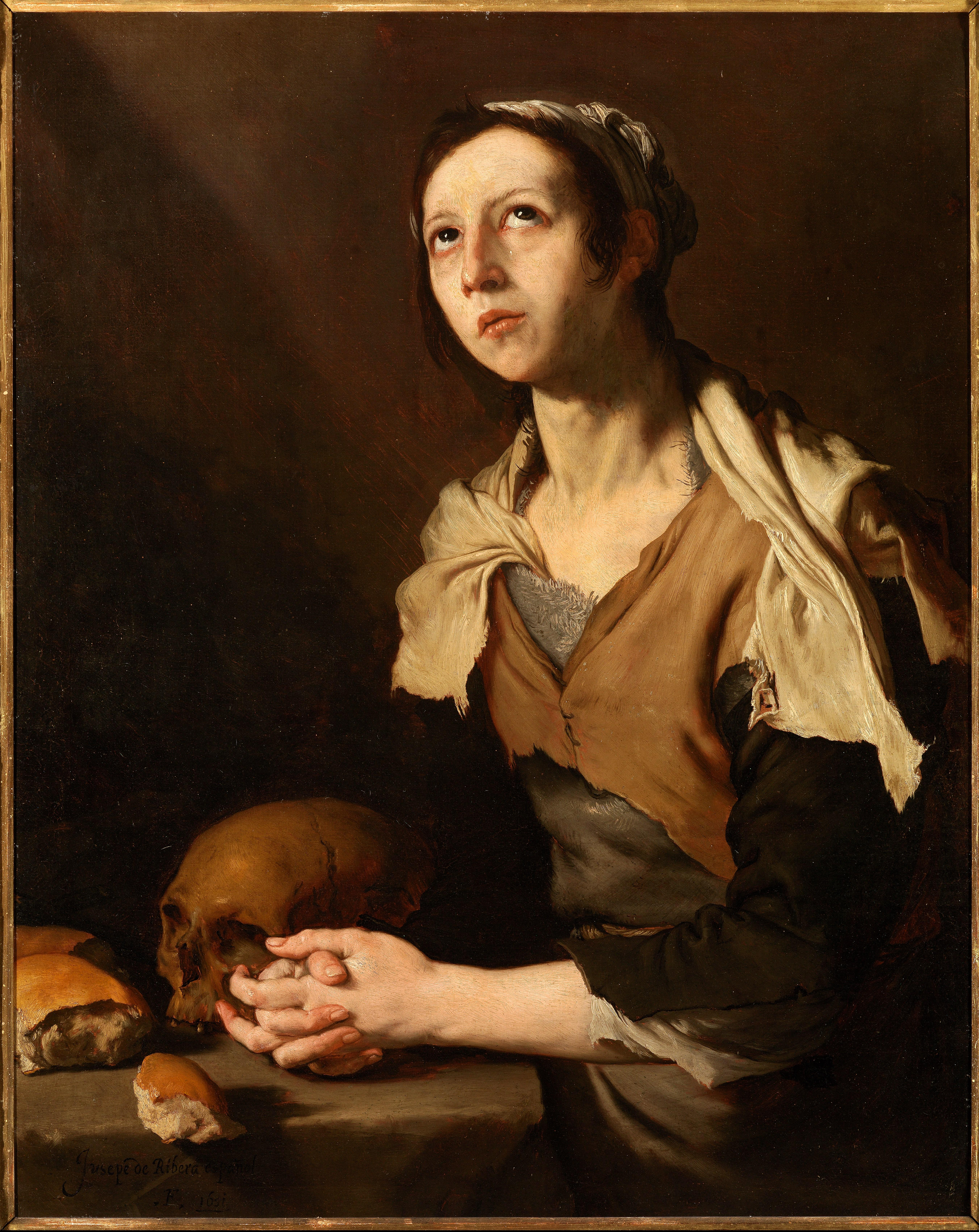
Saint Mary of Egypt, 1651, 88 x 71 cm., Museo Civico Filangieri

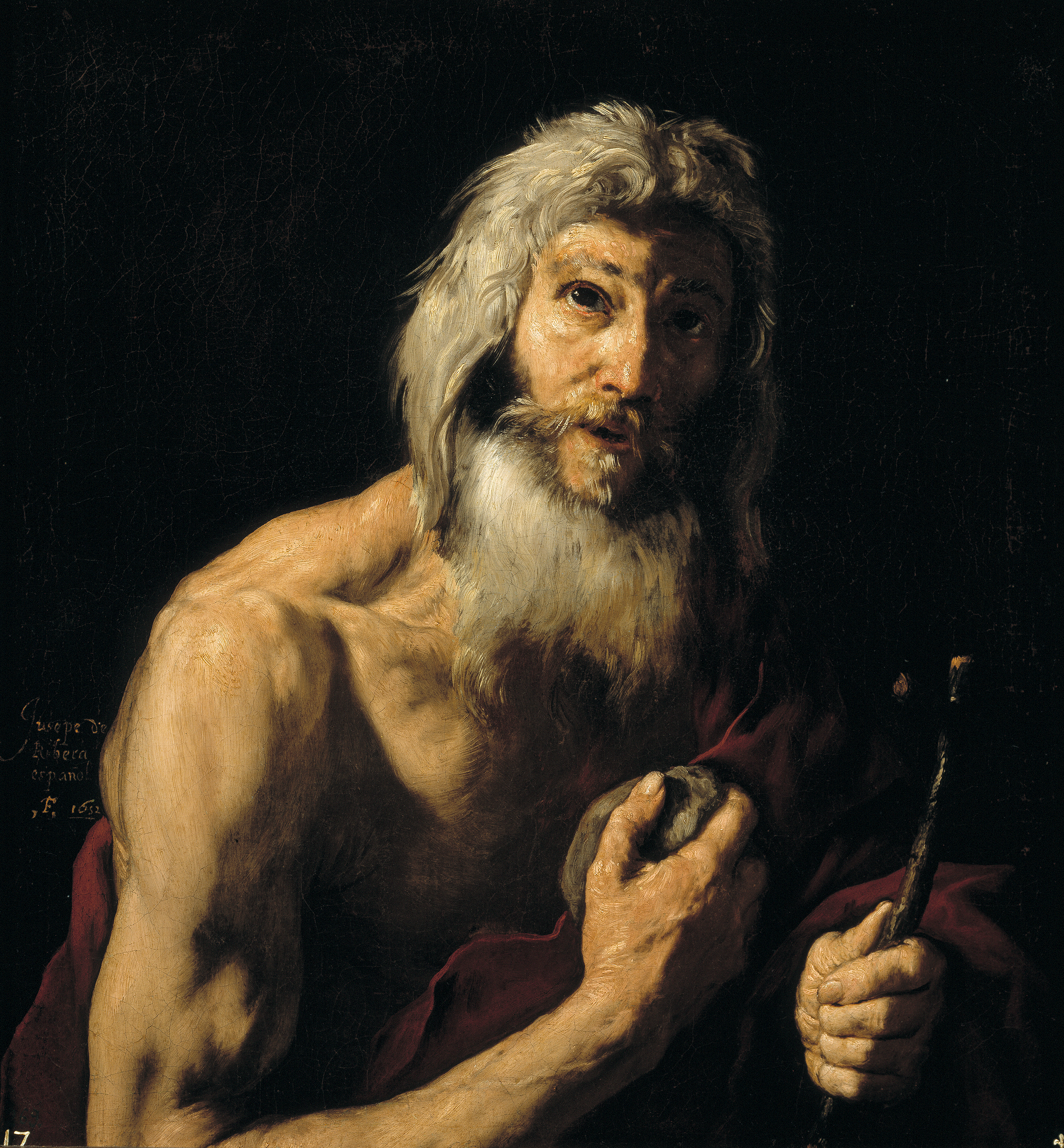
The Penitent Saint Jerome, 1652, 77.2 × 71.8 cm., Museo del Prado

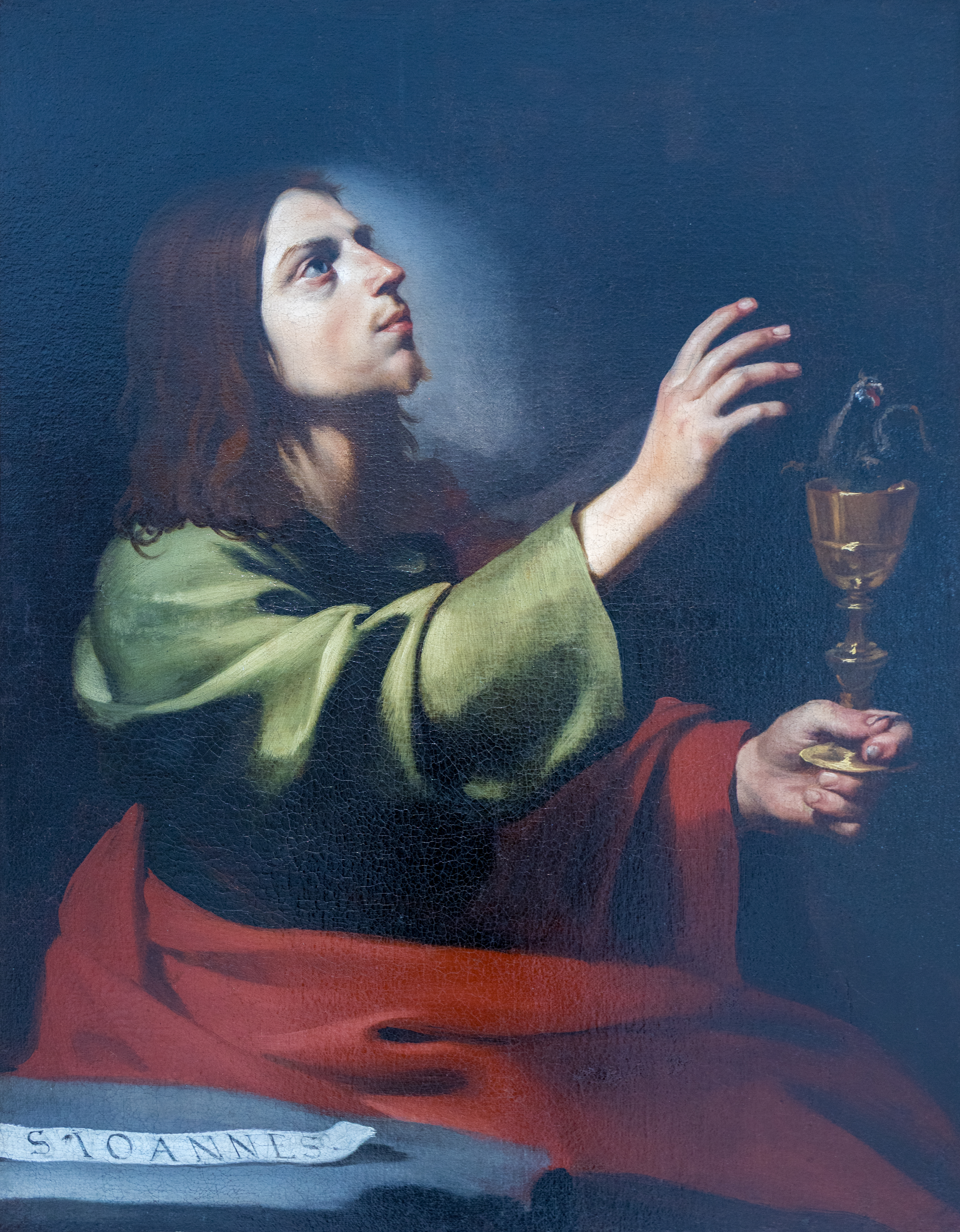
Saint John the Evangelist, Louvre Museum

=== Drawings ===
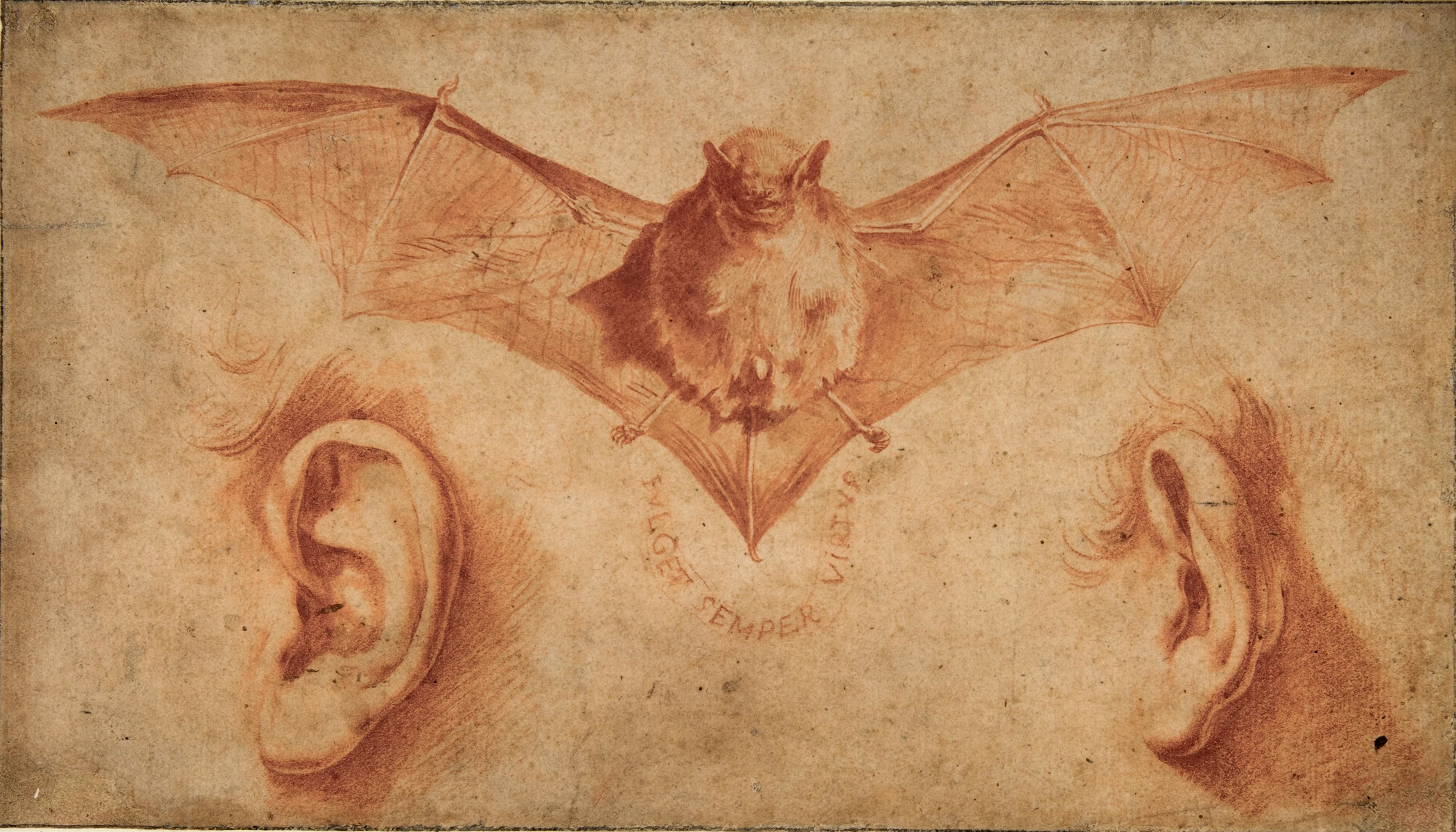
Study of Bat & Ears, ca. 1622, red chalk & wash,16 x 27.8 cm., Metropolitan Museum of Art

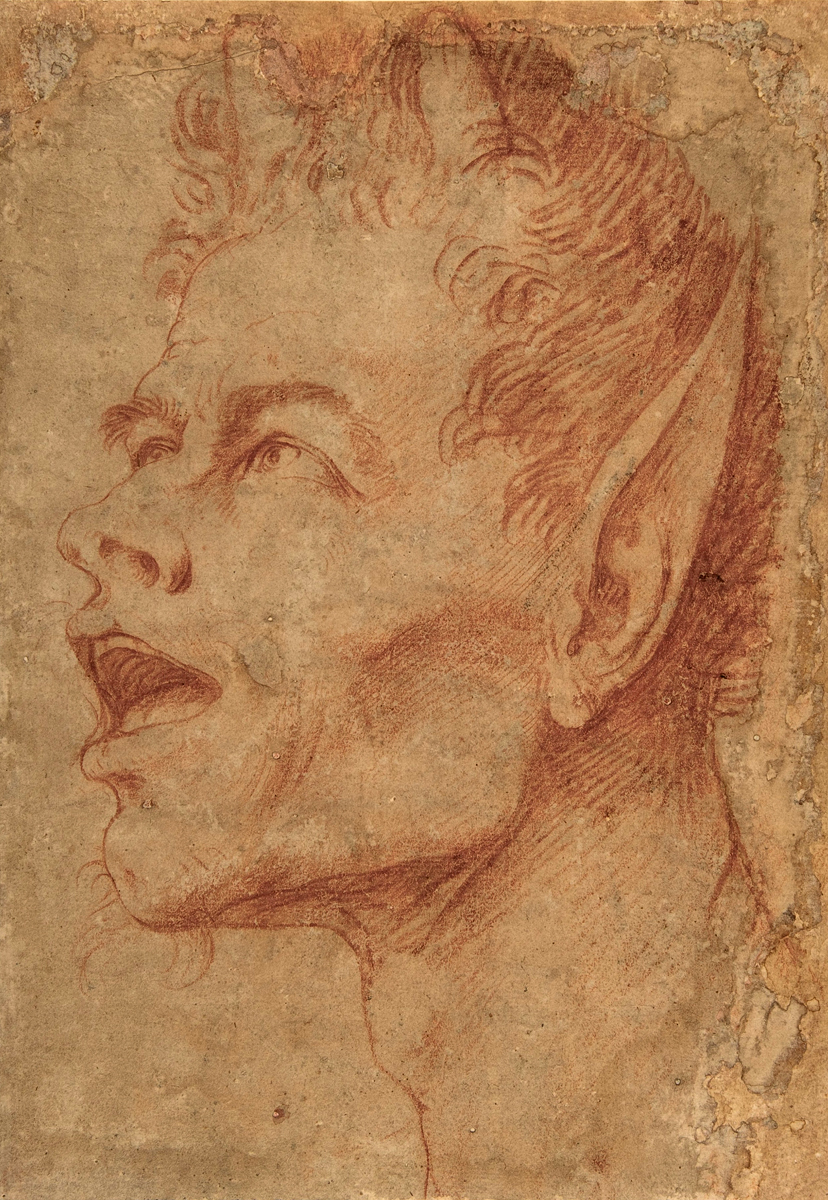
Head of a Satyr, ca. 1625–30, red chalk, 30.3 x 21.1 cm., Metropolitan Museum of Art

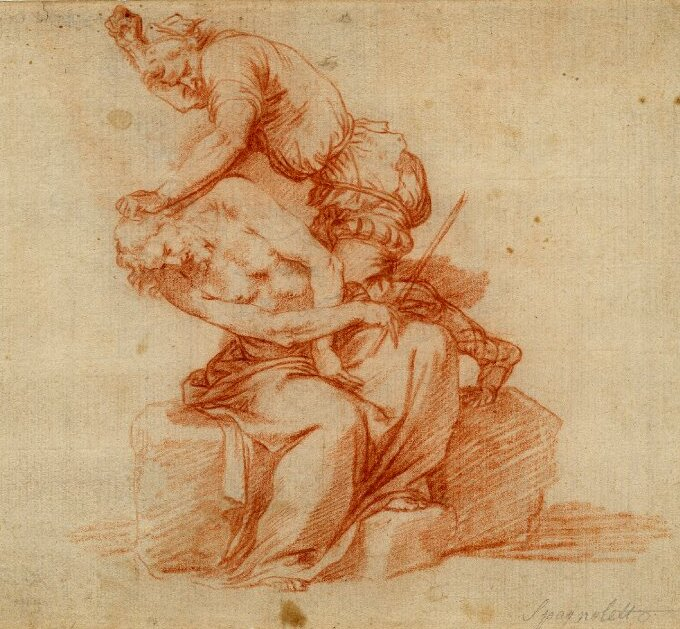
Christ Beaten by a Tormentor, ca. 1626, red chalk, 18.4 x 21.5 cm. British Museum

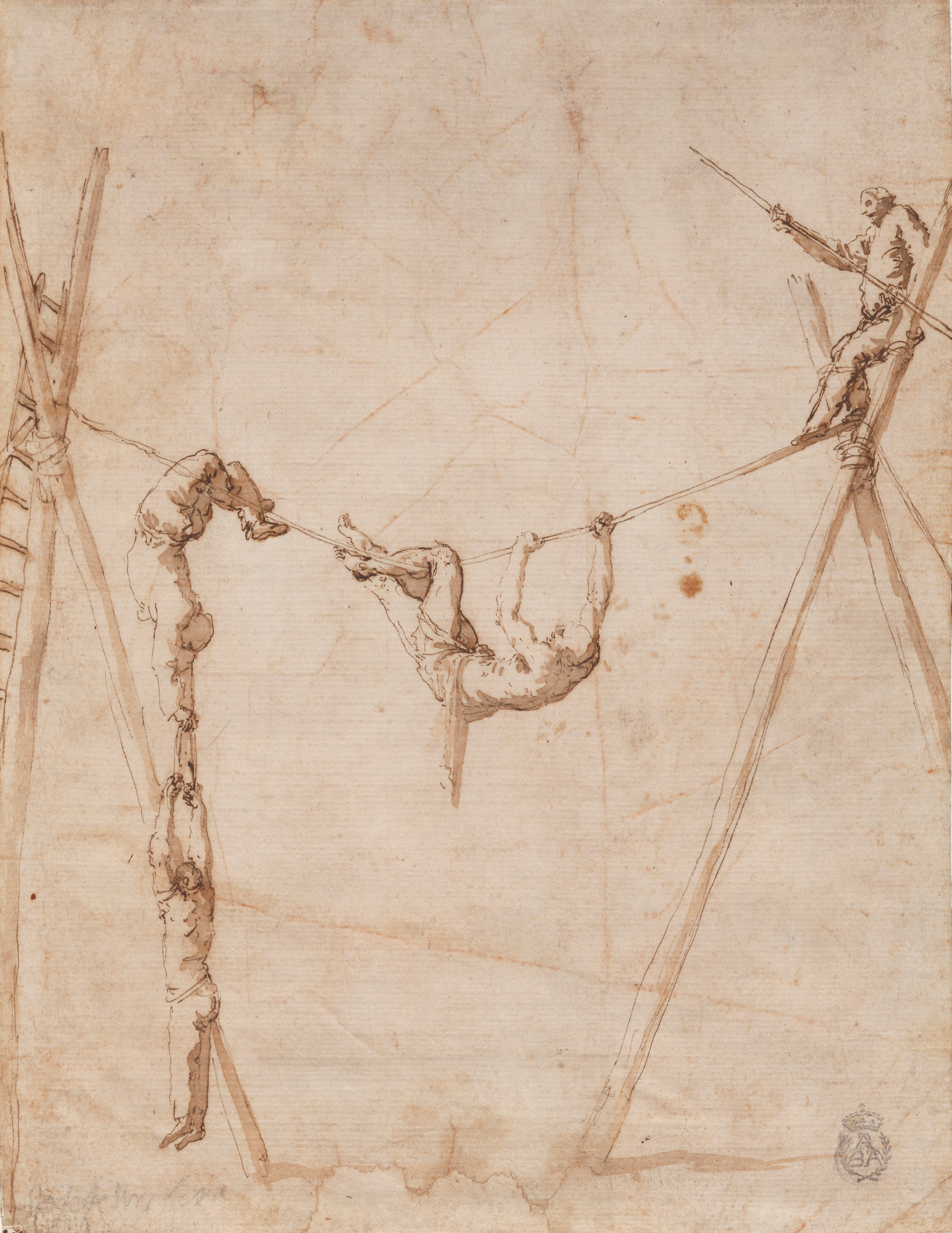
Acrobats on a High Wire, ca. 1634–35, pen & wash, 25.7 x 19.8 cm., Real Academia de Bellas Artes de San Fernando

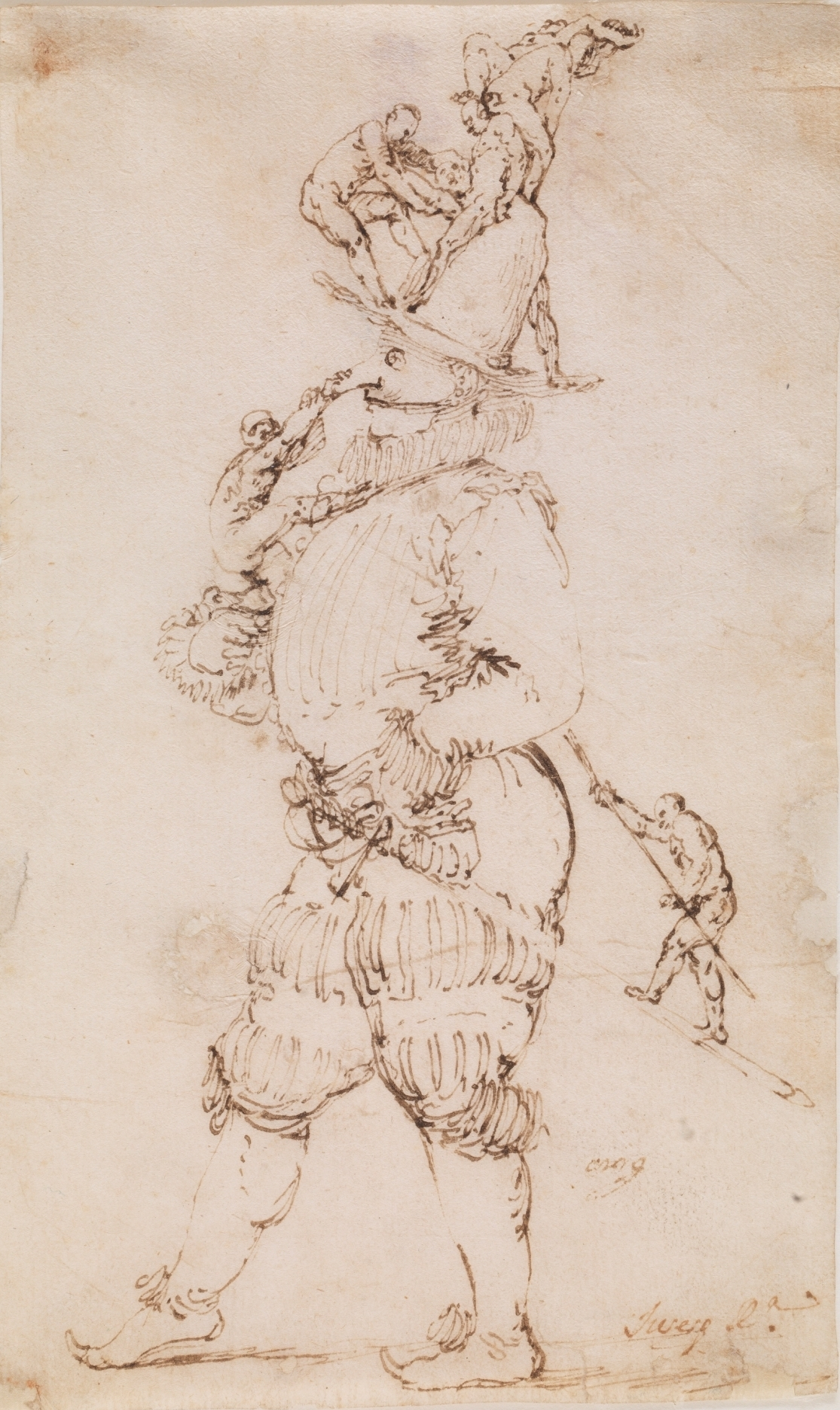
Fantastic Scene, pen & ink, 18.4 x 11 cm. private collection, Madrid

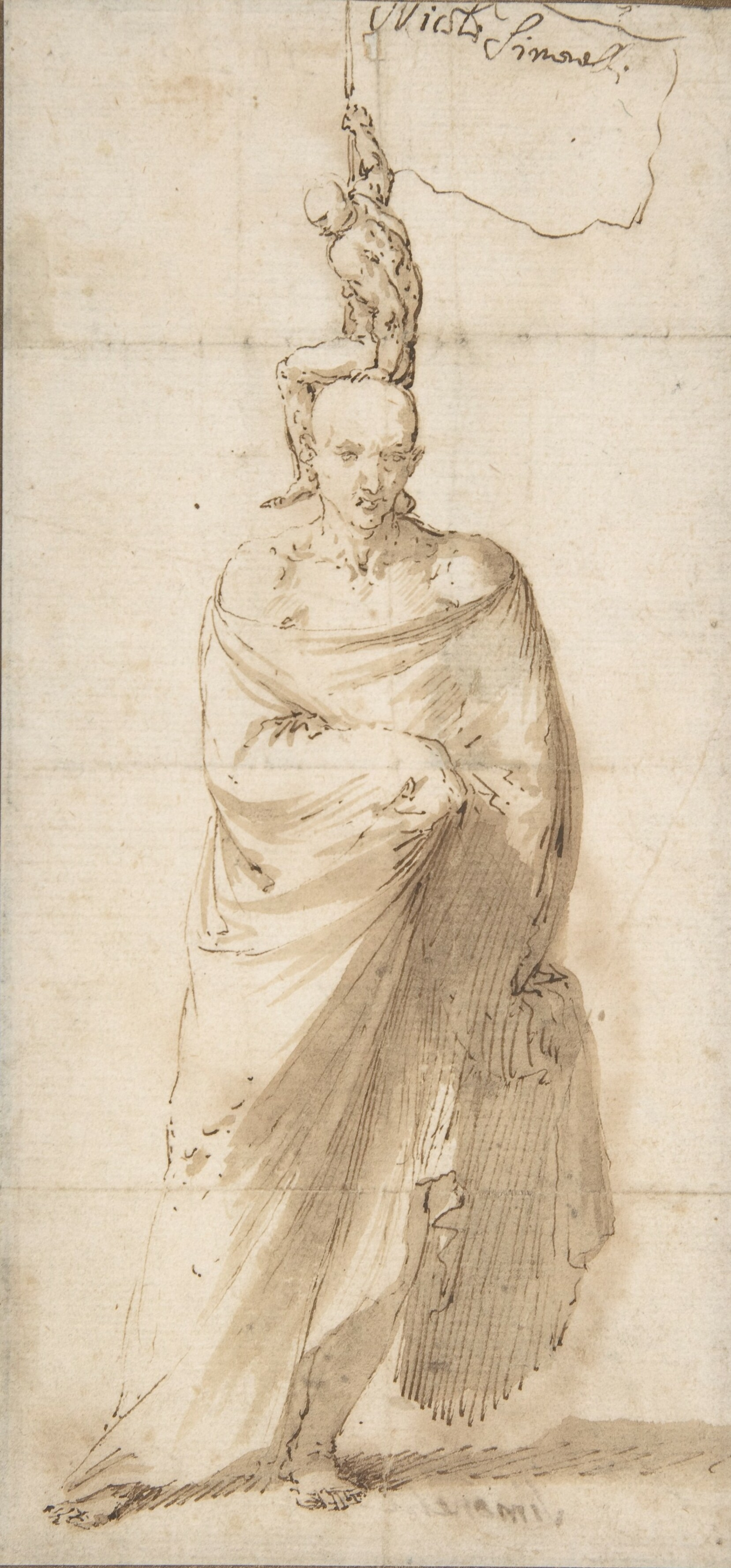
Man in a Toga, 1640s, pen & wash, 21 x 10 cm., Metropolitan Museum

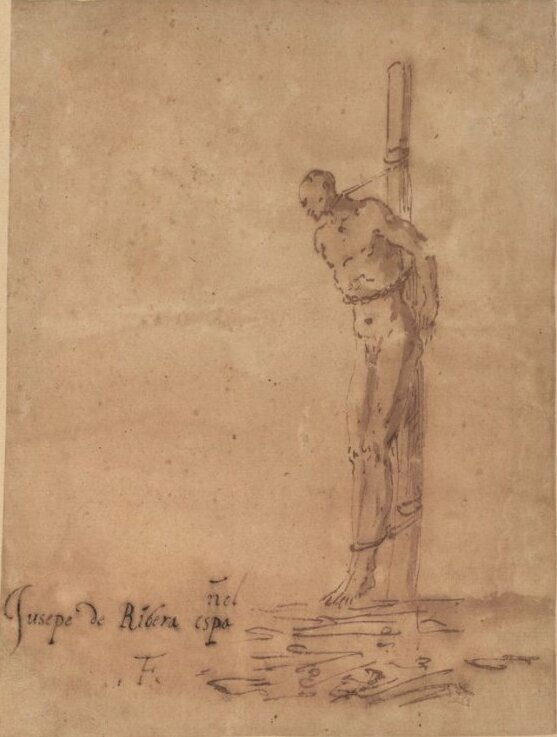
Man Bound to a Stake, 1940s, pen & wash, 21.6 x 16.3 cm. California Palace of the Legion of Honor

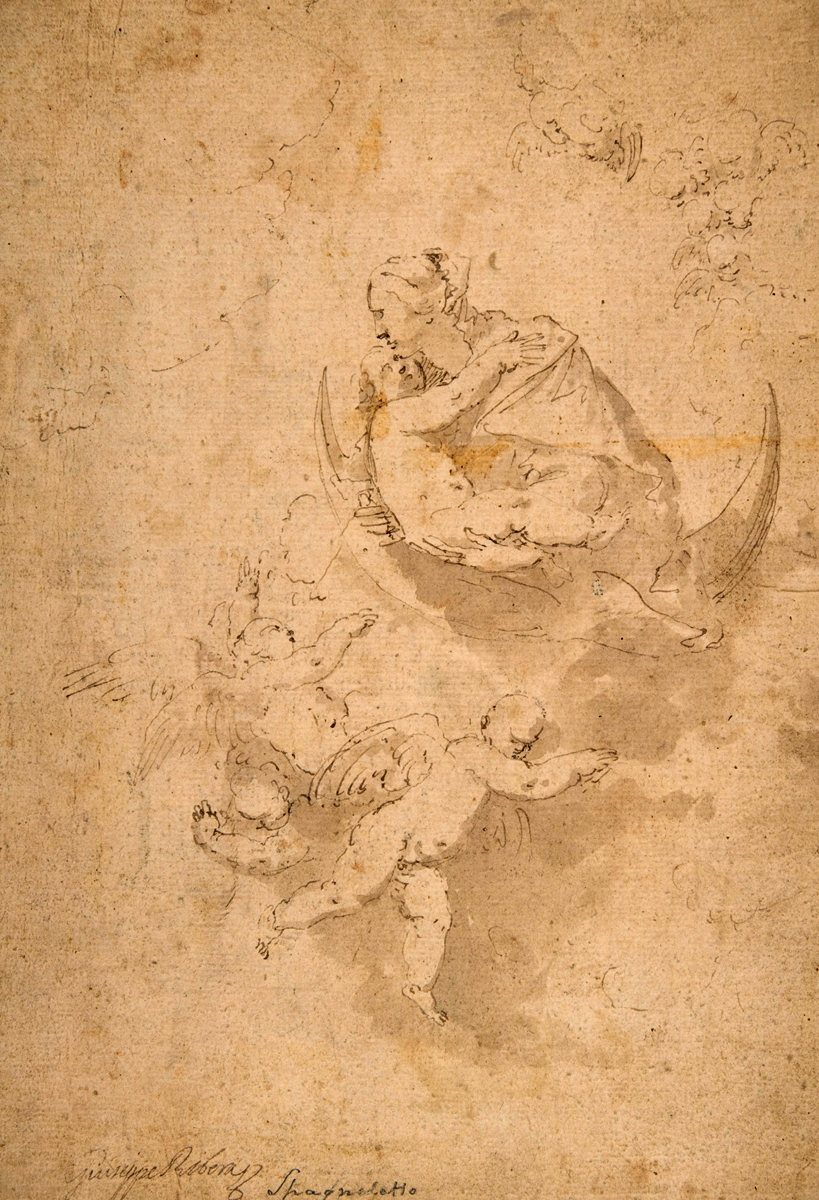
Virgin of the Crescent Moon, 1551–52, pen, ink & wash, 24 x 16.5 cm., Metropolitan Museum of Art

=== Prints: 1616–1630 ===
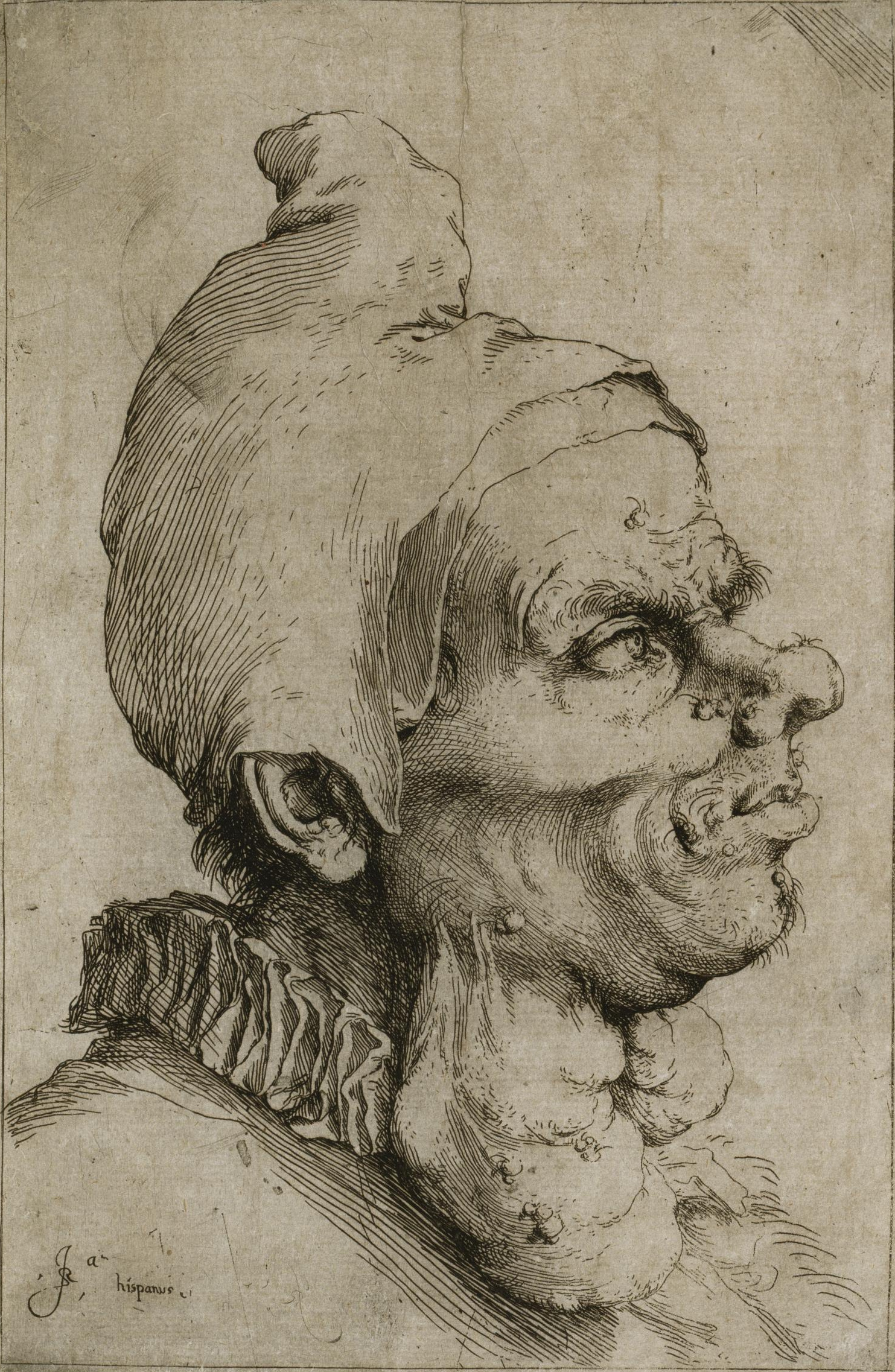
Large Grotesque Head, ca. 1617–27, etching, 22.3 x 15 cm.

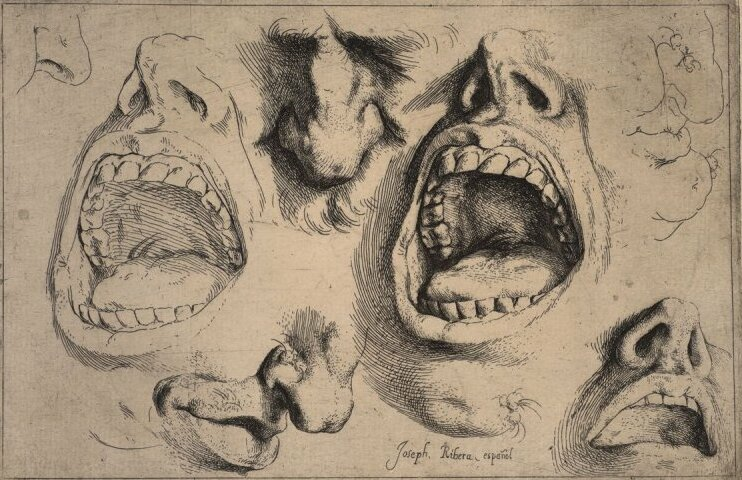
Studies of Noses and Mouths, ca. 1622, etching, 14.7 x 22.2 cm.

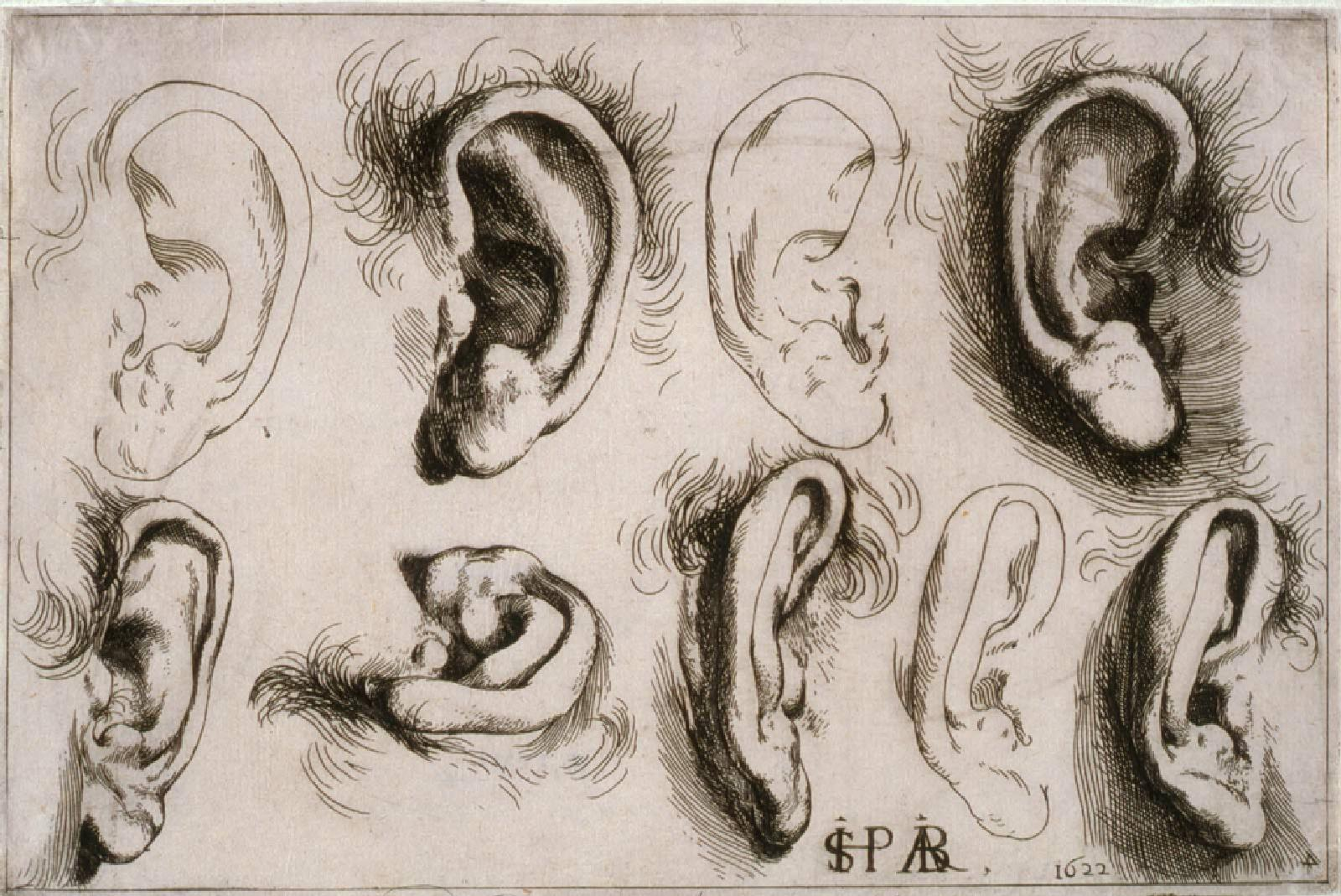
Studies of Ears, 1622, etching, 14.6 x 22.2 cm.

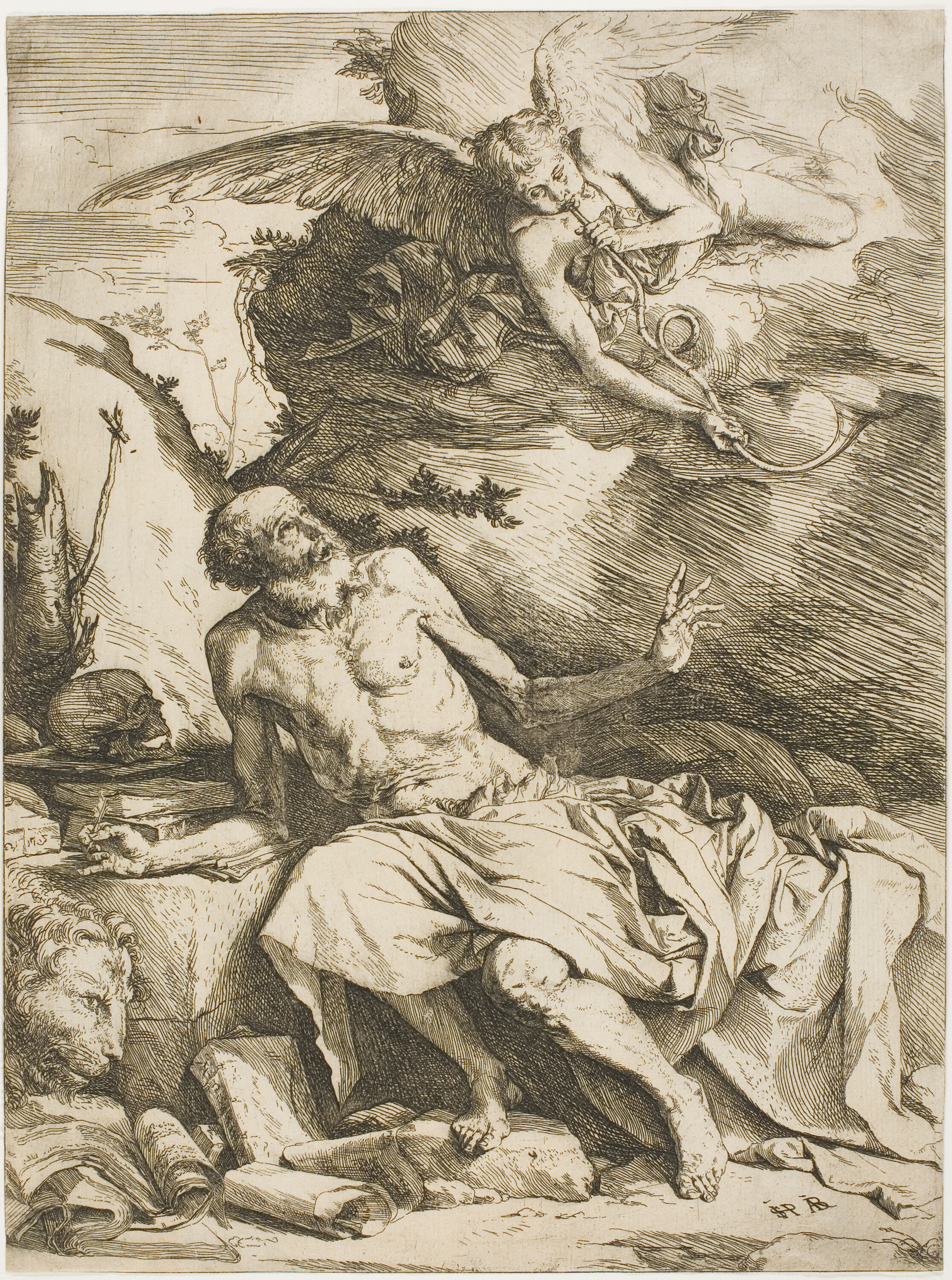
St. Jerome and the Trumpet of the Last Judgment, ca. 1621, etching & engraving, 31.5 x 23.6 cm.

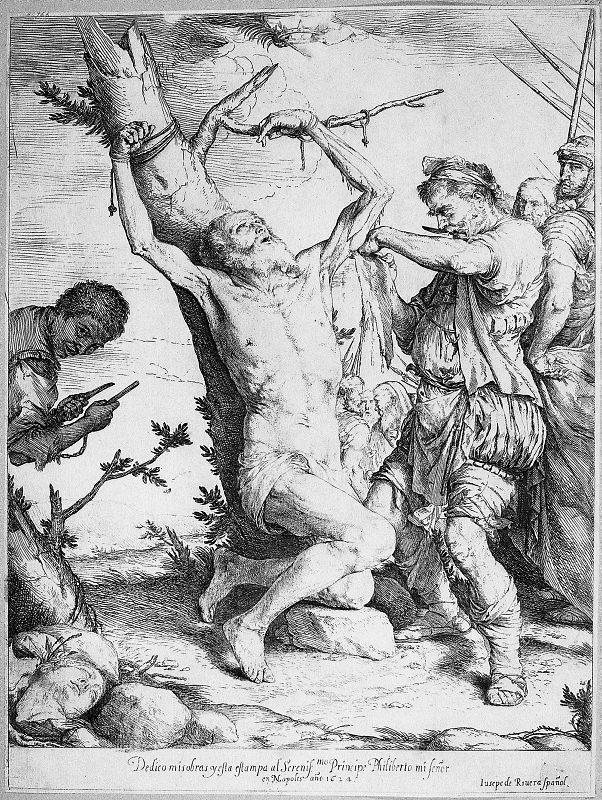
Martyrdom of St. Bartholomew, 1624, etching & engraving, 31.6 x 23.7 cm.

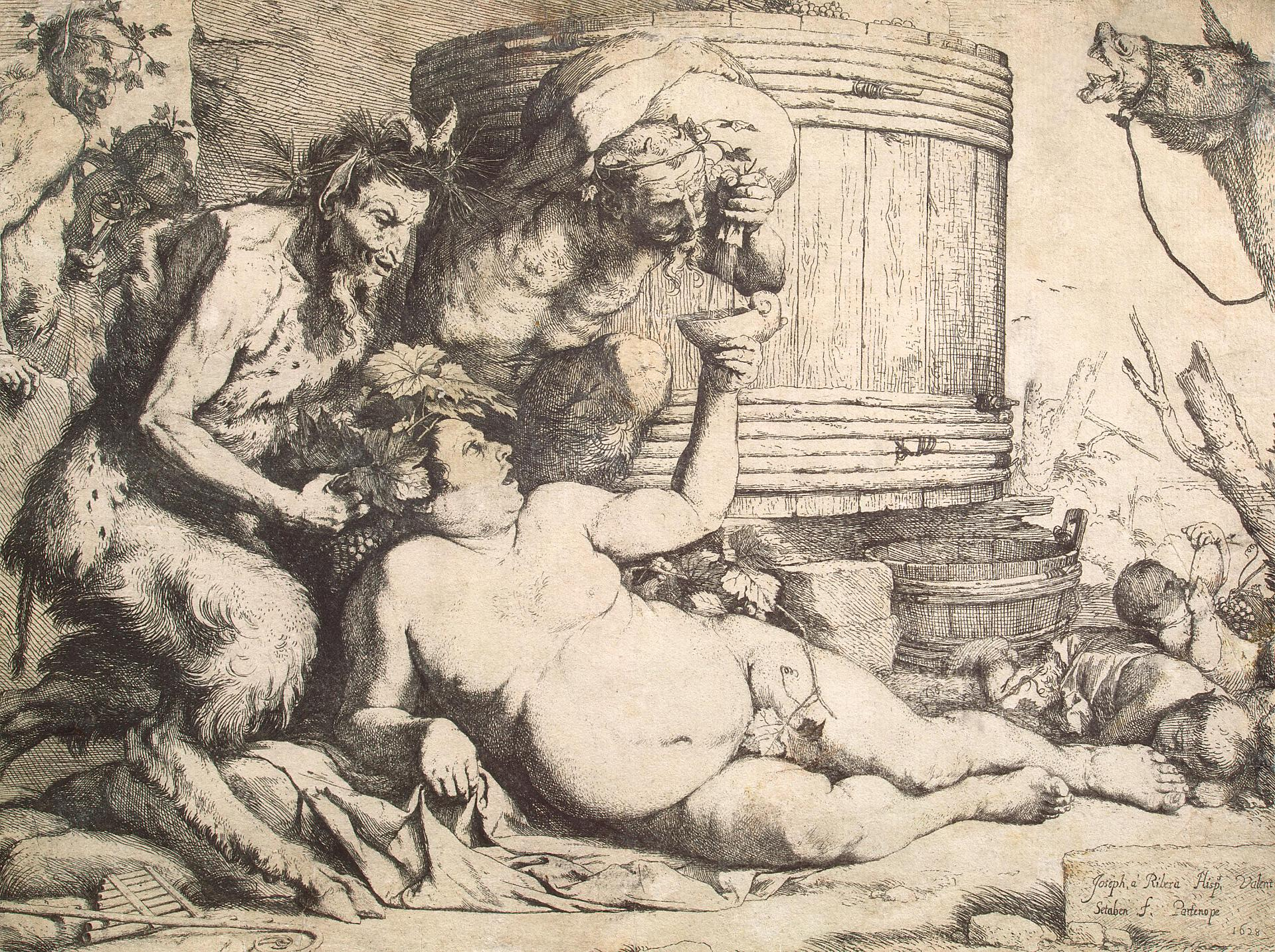
Drunken Silenus, etching & engraving, 27.3 x 35.5 cm.

== Notes ==
External videos
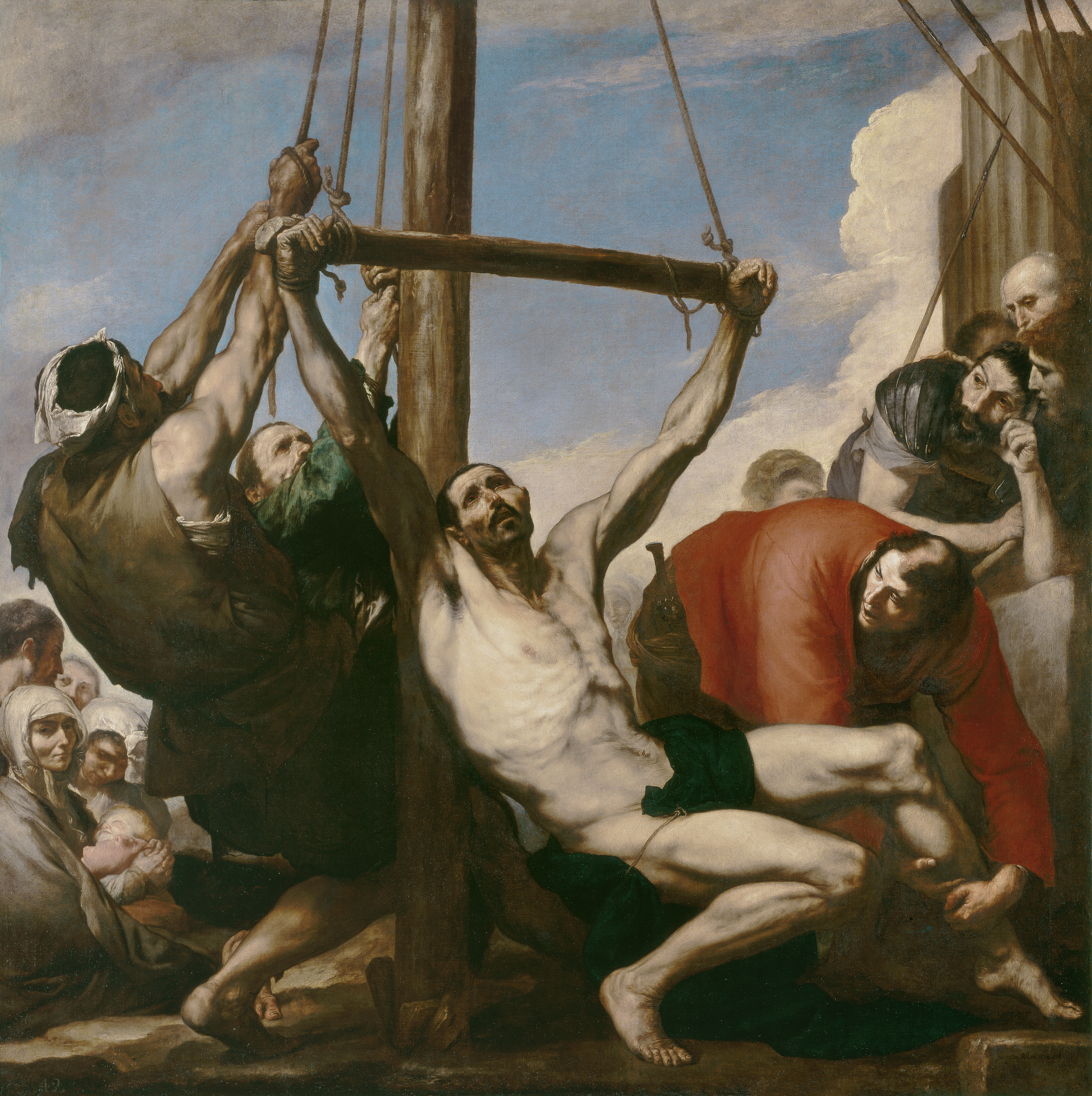
- Ribera's Martyrdom of Saint Philip, Smarthistory
