= Agro atellano =

Territory in Campania, Italy

- Territory
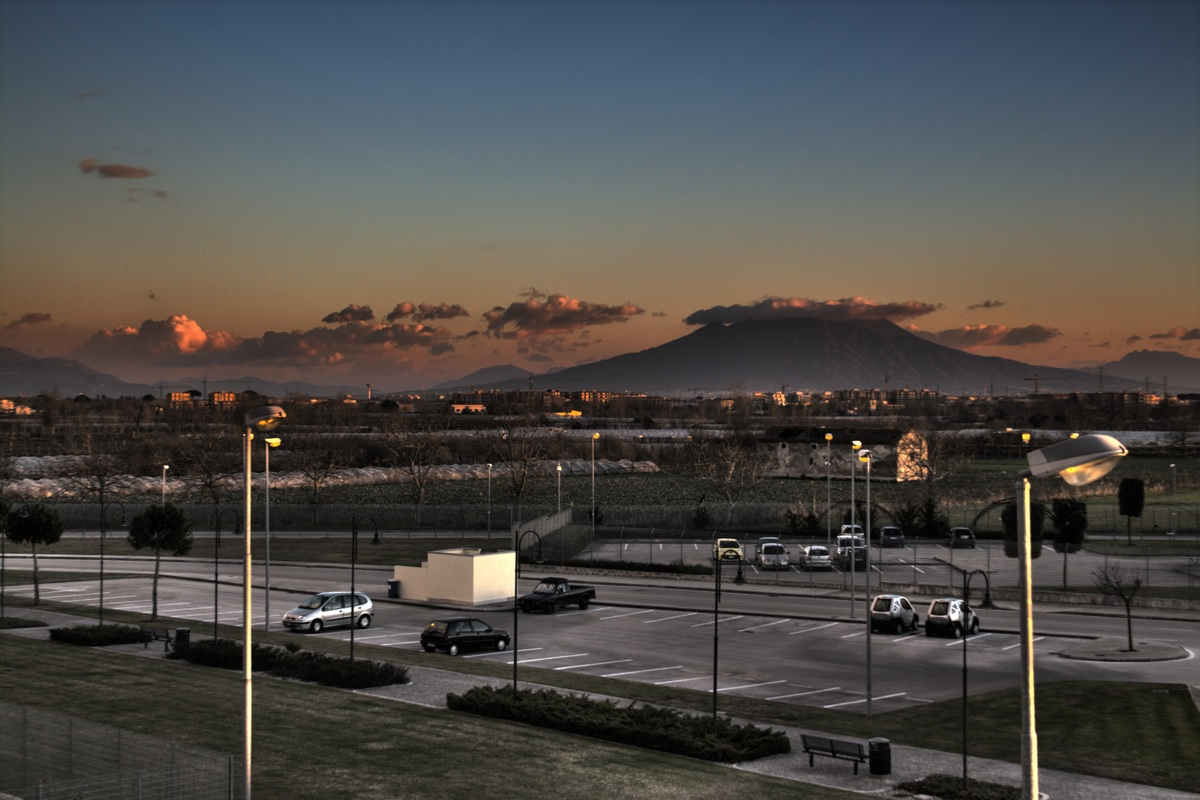
- Agro atellano panorama from U.S. Navy Gricignano Support Site

- Location within Italy
- Coordinates: 40°57′27″N 14°14′57″E
- Country: Italy
- Regions: Campania
- Provinces: Province of Caserta Metropolitan city of Naples
- Municipalities: Sant'Arpino, Orta di Atella, Succivo, Gricignano, Cesa, Sant'Antimo, Melito, Casandrino, Arzano, Grumo Nevano, Frattamaggiore, Frattaminore, Crispano, Cardito, Caivano, Afragola, Casoria, Casavatore, Secondigliano.
- Named for: Atella

Area
  - Land: 133.00 km^{2} (51.35 sq mi)

Population
  - Estimate: 490.000
- Time zone: UTC+1
  - Summer (DST): UTC+2

Agro atellano is an area of Campania, Italy.

The territory is made up of the municipalities of Sant'Arpino, Orta di Atella, Succivo, Gricignano, Cesa, Sant'Antimo, Melito, Casandrino, Arzano, Grumo Nevano, Frattamaggiore, Frattaminore, Crispano, Cardito, Caivano, Afragola, Casoria, Casavatore, Secondigliano.

It is divided into the atellano-aversana area for the north-western part (Gricignano, Cesa, Succivo, Orta, Sant'Arpino, Sant'Antimo, Melito, Casandrino, Frattaminore, Frattamaggiore) and in the atellano-neapolitan area for the south-eastern part (Caivano, Crispano, Cardito, Afragola, Casoria, Secondigliano, Casavatore, Arzano).

== Military Facilities ==
In the territory north of Gricignano and Succivo there is the U.S. Navy Support Site of the NSA of Naples, de facto area under the jurisdiction extraterritorial of the United States. A residential site complete with offices, hospital, schools, church, hotel, library, parks, shopping mall, sports facilities, swimming pool. It is home to 4,000 U.S. families serving at the U.S. Naval Forces Europe and Africa and U.S. Sixth Fleet. U.S. authorities including the first lady Jill Biden visited the Gricignano site.

During the construction of the site fundamental archaeological finds for the study of historical evolutions of the agro atellano and ancient Campania emerged.

== Sources ==
- RACCOLTA RASSEGNA STORICA DEI COMUNI VOL. 23 - ANNO 2009 Febbraio 2011 Impaginazione e adattamento a cura di Giacinto Libertini ISTITUTO DI STUDI ATELLANI
- Laforgia, Elena (2007). Soprintendenza per i beni archeologici di Napoli e Caserta. Napoli: Electa. ISBN 978-88-510-0458-3.
