= Giuseppe Marullo =

Italian painter

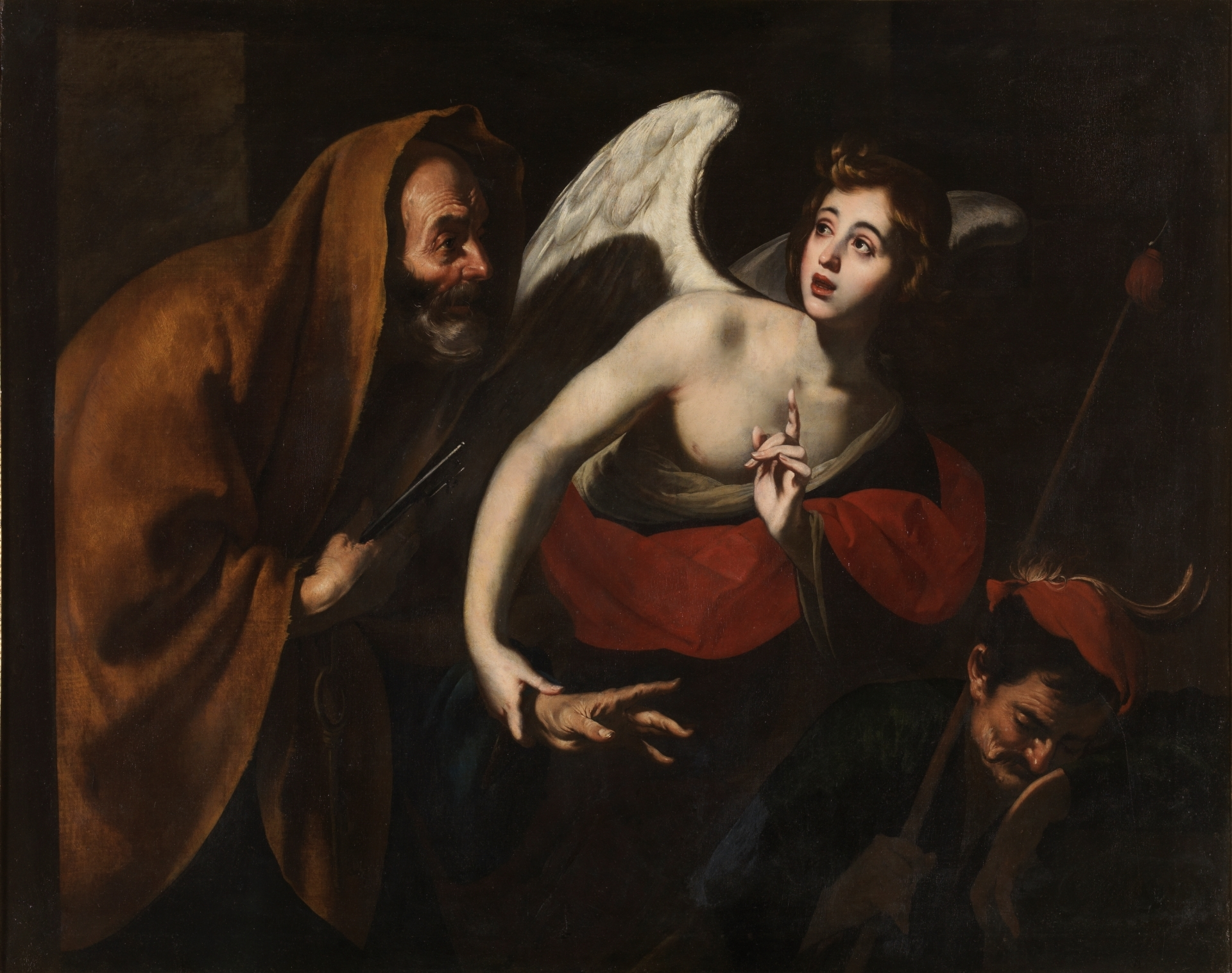
- San Pedro released by the angel, oil on canvas, 127 x 159 cm.
- Born: around 1610; Orta di Atella, near Caserta (now an Italian province)
- Died: 1685; Naples, Italy
- Occupation: artist

Giuseppe Marullo (died 1685 in Naples) was an Italian painter of the Baroque period, active near his natal city of Orta di Atella. He was a pupil of Massimo Stanzione. He painted Saint Peter Released by the Angel (1630–40) which is now at the Museo del Prado in Madrid.
