= Lucidi =

Lucidi is an Italian surname. Notable people with the surname include:

- Daisy Lúcidi (1929–2020), Brazilian actress, radio broadcaster, and politician
- Evaristo Lucidi (1866–1929), Italian cardinal of the Catholic Church
- Maurizio Lucidi (1932–2005), Italian director, screenwriter and editor
- Renzo Lucidi, Italian film editor

== See also ==
- Lucidi Motors, auto racing team based in Italy
