= Saint Agnes (Massimo Stanzione) =

Painting by Massimo Stanzione

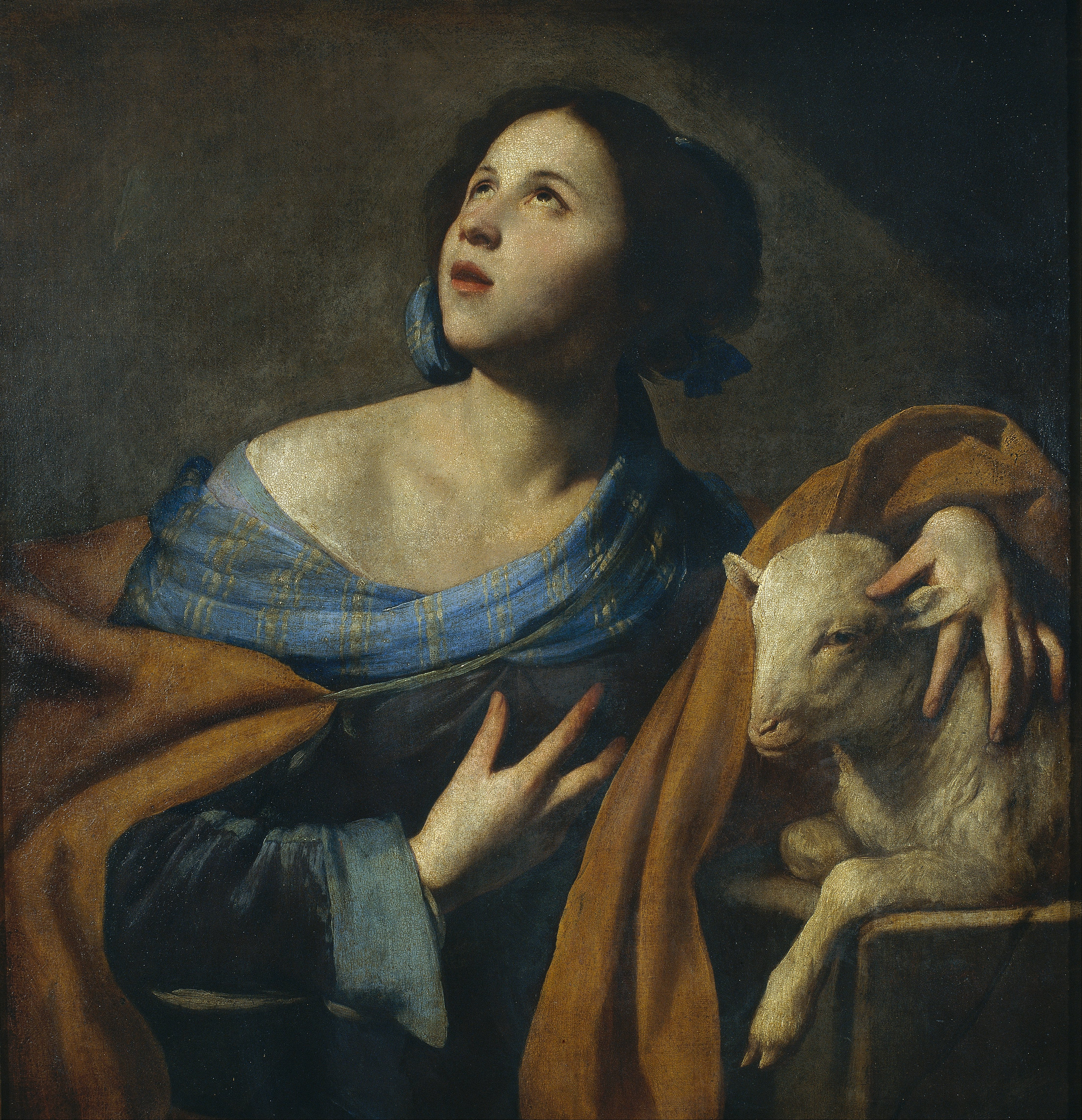
- Artist: Massimo Stanzione
- Year: 1635–1640
- Type: Painting
- Medium: Oil on canvas
- Dimensions: 83.5 cm × 75 cm (32.9 in × 29.5 in)
- Location: Museu Nacional d'Art de Catalunya; Barcelona
- Accession: Santiago Espona Bequest, 1858

Saint Agnes is an oil-on-canvas painting executed c. 1635–1640 by the Italian Baroque painter Massimo Stanzione. It is now in the National Art Museum of Catalonia.

== Description ==
A three-quarter length depiction of Agnes of Rome shows the saint in direct communication with God. Her head is slightly raised, her mouth half open, and the fingers of her hand are spread open over her heart while with her other hand she caresses the Mystic Lamb. Her neckline shifts sideways to reveal part of her shoulder, the highest degree of eroticism in the work of Stanzione.

== History ==
The work was attributed to Massimo Stanzione (Frattamaggiore 1585 – Naples 1656) in 1954 by José Milicua, who viewed it in the collection of Tomás Harris at that time. The work made its way to the collection of Santiago Espona who bequested it to the Museu Nacional d'Art de Catalunya in November 1958.

=== Exposition catalogue listings ===
- 1958 Barcelona p. 11 Cat #78
- 1963 Barcelona P.16
- 1987 Girona p. 48 Cat #46
- 1989 Barcelona p. 49 Cat #46
- 1998 Palma p. 114 Cat #32

== Analysis ==
In attributing this painting to Stanzione, José Milicua offers comparisons between this painting and another portrayal of the same saint by Stanzione which belonged to the Laliccia Collection in Naples which makes use of the same model and is differentiated only by a slight turn of the model's head. In both paintings, Stanzione has dispensed with the halo and palm leaf, omissions that are common in Neapolitan painting of the 1600s. Although lacking the traditional external signs of sainthood, her status as one of God's elect is evidenced in the raised head and upturned eyes, an open mouth, and the hand with fingers spread over the heart. The block of stone closing off a corner of the composition is a device commonly used in Neapolitan painting of this century. However, in the case of Saint Agnes, the stone block also serves to represent the altar on which the Agnus Dei, or sacrificial lamb is placed.

Stuck to the back of the canvas are some lines of poetry in English in praise of Saint Agnes, cut from printed matter which looks like it might be from the nineteenth century or earlier.
