= Pietà (Stanzione) =

1638 painting by Massimo Stanzione

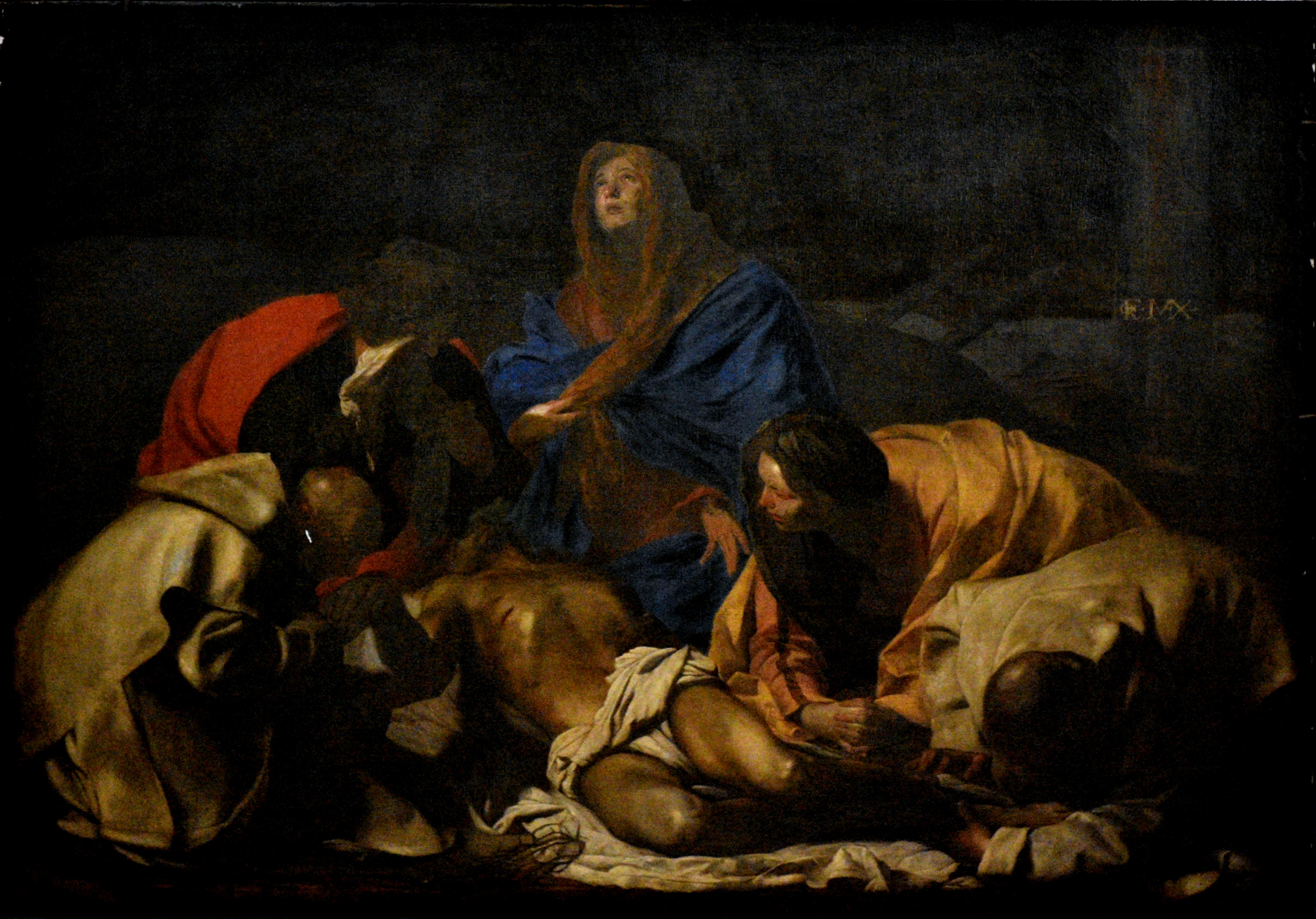

The Pietà is a 1638 oil on canvas painting by Massimo Stanzione, commissioned in 1638 for the Certosa di San Martino, where it still hangs. He also treated the subject in a 1621-1625 work now in the Gallerie nazionali d'arte antica in palazzo Barberini, Rome.

Its treatment of colour is influenced by Jusepe de Ribera and its pyramidal composition is heavily influenced by the Pietà by Annibale Carracci. Some accounts state that Ribera, who was producing a work on the same subject for the Certosa's sacristy, became so afraid that Stanzione's work would overshadow his that he suggested adding a compound of his own making to it to make its colours brighter. This compound in fact damaged Stanzione's pigments but Stanzione refused the monks' request to restore the work.
