= Pietà (Ribera, Madrid) =

Painting by Jusepe de Ribera in Madrid

The Pietà
- La Piedad (Spanish)
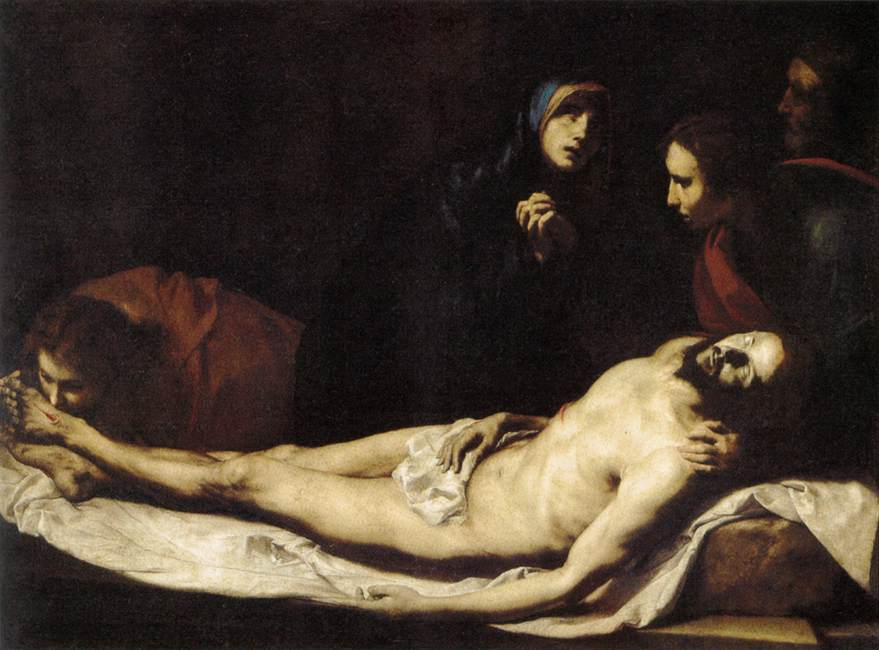
- Artist: Jusepe de Ribera
- Year: 1633
- Medium: oil on canvas
- Dimensions: 157 cm × 210 cm (62 in × 83 in)
- Location: Museo Thyssen-Bornemisza, Madrid

The Pietà is an oil on canvas painting by José de Ribera, "The Españoleto", painted, signed and dated in 1633.

== Description ==
The painting is in oils on canvas and its dimensions are 157 x 210 cm. It is owned by the Thyssen-Bornemisza Museum in Madrid.

Ribera painted two other known canvases of the same subject. One is in the San Martino Museum and the other is in the National Gallery, London.

== History ==
The painting comes from the collection of the Marquis de Heredia. The work's commissioner is unknown. The canvas is signed in the lower right corner on a rock according to the usual formula the artist used at the time: "Jusepe de Ribera español 1633". Ribera was one of the most prolific painters, both in the quantity of works that came out of his workshop and its quality.

Ribera painted the subject of the Pietá on numerous occasions and with many different variations throughout his life. The earliest of his extant Pietás dates to 1620 (National Gallery) whilst two others were produced in 1633 (Thyssen Museum) and 1637 (Charterhouse of San Martino, Naples).

== Description ==
The work is part of a transition period in which the artist, without leaving the shadows of tenebrism, began to experiment with brighter coloring inspired by the work of artists such as Rubens and van Dyck.

The body of Christ is framed horizontally in the foreground of the composition. On the right, John the Apostle supports the subject's back while the grieving Mary Magdalene kisses Christ's feet. In the center is Mary with a face ravaged by pain looking to the sky and placing her hands together in prayer. At the upper right, the face of Joseph of Arimathea emerges from the darkness, veiled by the chiaroscuro technique.

The spotlight of the composition is focused on the recumbent body and harshly exposes Christ's painful wounds, while a corresponding psychic pain is expressed in the face and gesture of the Virgin.

== Sources ==
- Spinosa, Nicola (1978). Obra pictórica completa de Ribera. Noguer. ISBN 8427987676.
