= Gricignano di Aversa =

- Comune
- Comune di Gricignano di Aversa
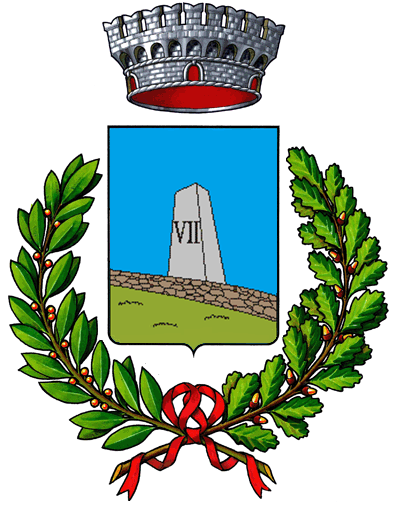
- Coat of arms

- Location within Italy Location within Campania
- Coordinates: 40°59′N 14°14′E
- Country: Italy
- Region: Campania
- Province: Caserta (CE)

Government
  - Mayor: Vincenzo Santagata

Area
  - Total: 9.8 km^{2} (3.8 sq mi)
- Elevation: 28 m (92 ft)

Population (31 March 2017)
  - Total: 12,202
  - Density: 1,200/km^{2} (3,200/sq mi)
- Demonym: Gricignanesi
- Time zone: UTC+1 (CET)
  - Summer (DST): UTC+2 (CEST)
- Postal code: 81030
- Dialing code: 081
- Website: Official website

Gricignano di Aversa (Campanian: Rricignànë or, less commonly, Rricignèn) is a comune (municipality) in the Province of Caserta in the Italian region of Campania, located about 15 kilometres (9 mi) north of Naples and about 13 kilometres (8 mi) southwest of Caserta.

Located in agro atellano, it is known for the U.S. Navy Support Site of the Naples NSA.

Gricignano borders the following municipalities: Aversa, Teverola, Marcianise, Cesa, Succivo, Sant'Arpino.

The ancient city of Atella was located nearby.

== Education ==
Naples Elementary School and Naples Middle/High School, schools for children of U.S. military personnel, are in the commune.
