= Crispano =

- Comune
- Comune di Crispano
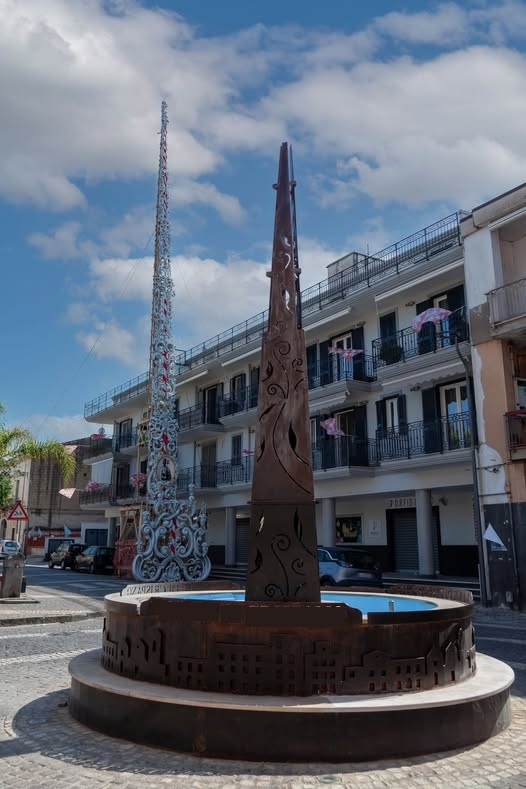

- Location within Italy Location within Campania
- Coordinates: 40°57′N 14°17′E
- Country: Italy
- Region: Campania
- Metropolitan city: Naples (NA)

Government
  - Mayor: Commissar

Area
  - Total: 2.22 km^{2} (0.86 sq mi)
- Elevation: 37 m (121 ft)

Population (30 June 2017)
  - Total: 12,305
  - Density: 5,540/km^{2} (14,400/sq mi)
- Demonym: Crispanesi
- Time zone: UTC+1 (CET)
  - Summer (DST): UTC+2 (CEST)
- Postal code: 80020
- Dialing code: 081
- Patron saint: St. Gregory the Great
- Saint day: March 12
- Website: Official website

Crispano is a comune (municipality) in the Metropolitan City of Naples in the Italian region Campania, located about 13 km (8.1 mi) north of Naples.

Crispano borders the following municipalities: Caivano, Cardito, Frattamaggiore, Frattaminore, Orta di Atella.
