= Santa Maria in Aquiro =

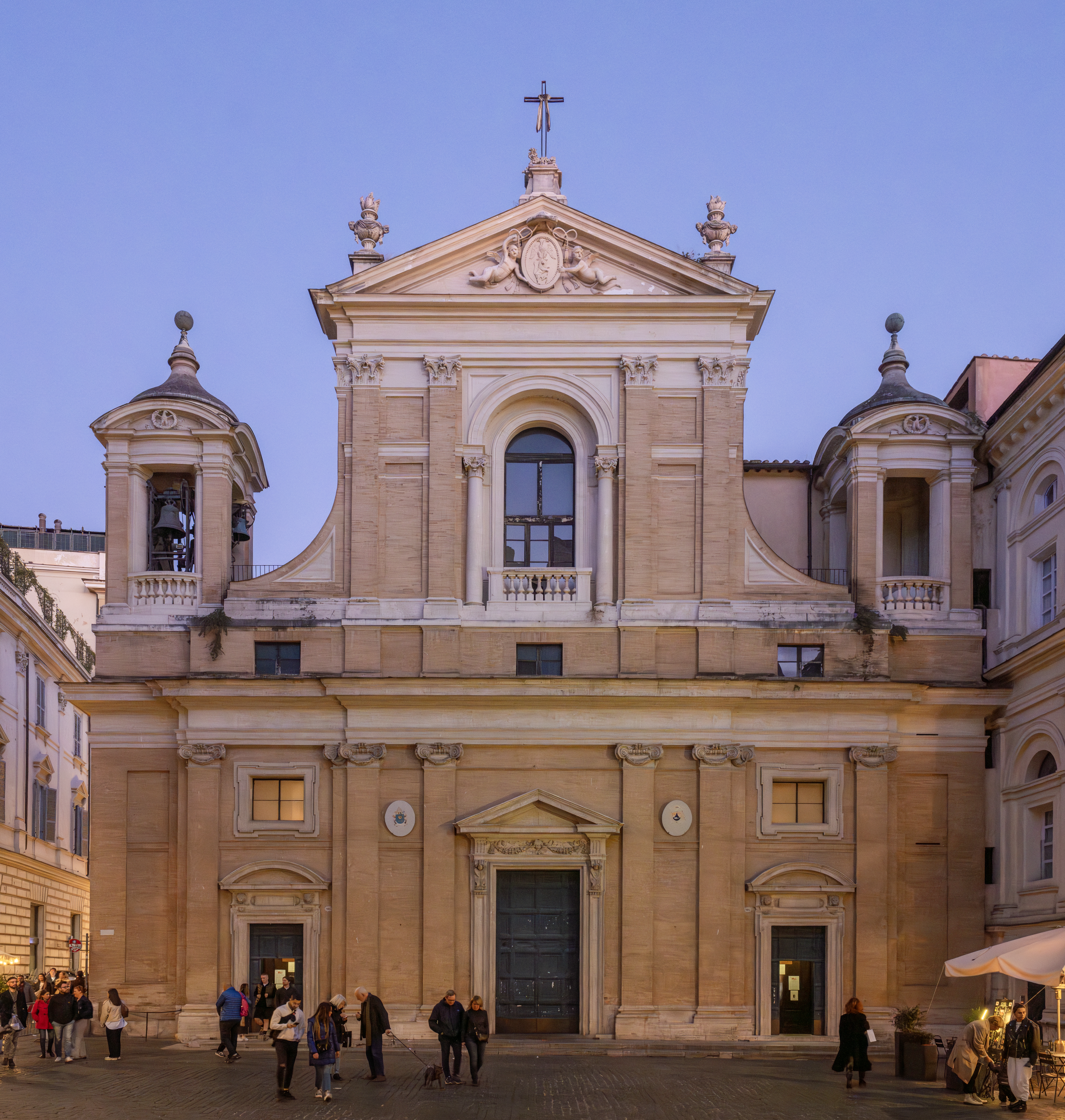
- Façade
- Click on the map for a fullscreen view
- 41°53′59.87″N 12°28′41.09″E
- Location: Via della Guglia 69B, Rome
- Country: Italy
- Denomination: Roman Catholic

History
- Dedication: Mary, mother of Jesus

Architecture
- Architectural type: Church
- Style: Baroque
- Groundbreaking: before 8th century
- Completed: 1588 (reconstruction)

Santa Maria in Aquiro is a church in Rome, Italy. It is dedicated in honor of Mary, mother of Jesus, and is located on Piazza Capranica.

The church is ancient—it was restored by Pope Gregory III in the 8th century, and thus must have existed before then. One theory is that it was the titulus Equitii, though San Martino ai Monti is a more likely candidate. It is also referred to as Santa Maria della Visitazione, notably by Pope Urban VI in 1389. The origins of the name are nebulous; most attribute it to a corruption of the term a Cyro, perhaps referring in early days to a neighborhood resident named Cyrus or deriving from Cyrus. According to another theory Acyro refers to a corruption of the Latin word circus, a stadium for horse racing; the Circus Flaminius was located in the vicinity. In 1540 Pope Paul III granted the church to the Confraternity of Orphans, and it was restored in 1588.

== Art and architecture ==
The most important work of art in the church is a 14th-century painting, in the apse, of the Madonna and Child with St Stephen, attributed to the school of Pietro Cavallini. This painting and the funeral lapidary monuments in the vestibule are from the medieval church of Santo Stefano del Trullo, destroyed during the pontificate of Pope Alexander VII (1655–1667). There are also paintings from the 17th and 18th centuries. The facade was completed by 1774 by Pietro Camporese the Elder, based on designs of Giovanni Francesco Braccioli. The interior was redecorated by Cesare Mariani in 1866.

Two chapels have paintings by followers of Caravaggio: the third chapel at right has a Virgin and Saints (1617) by Carlo Saraceni, while the second chapel on the left has three canvasses – Deposition from the Cross, Crowning with the crown of thorns, and Flagellation of Christ (1635-1640) – attributed to the Frenchman Trophime Bigot. Formerly these paintings were thought to be by the hand of Gerard van Honthorst.

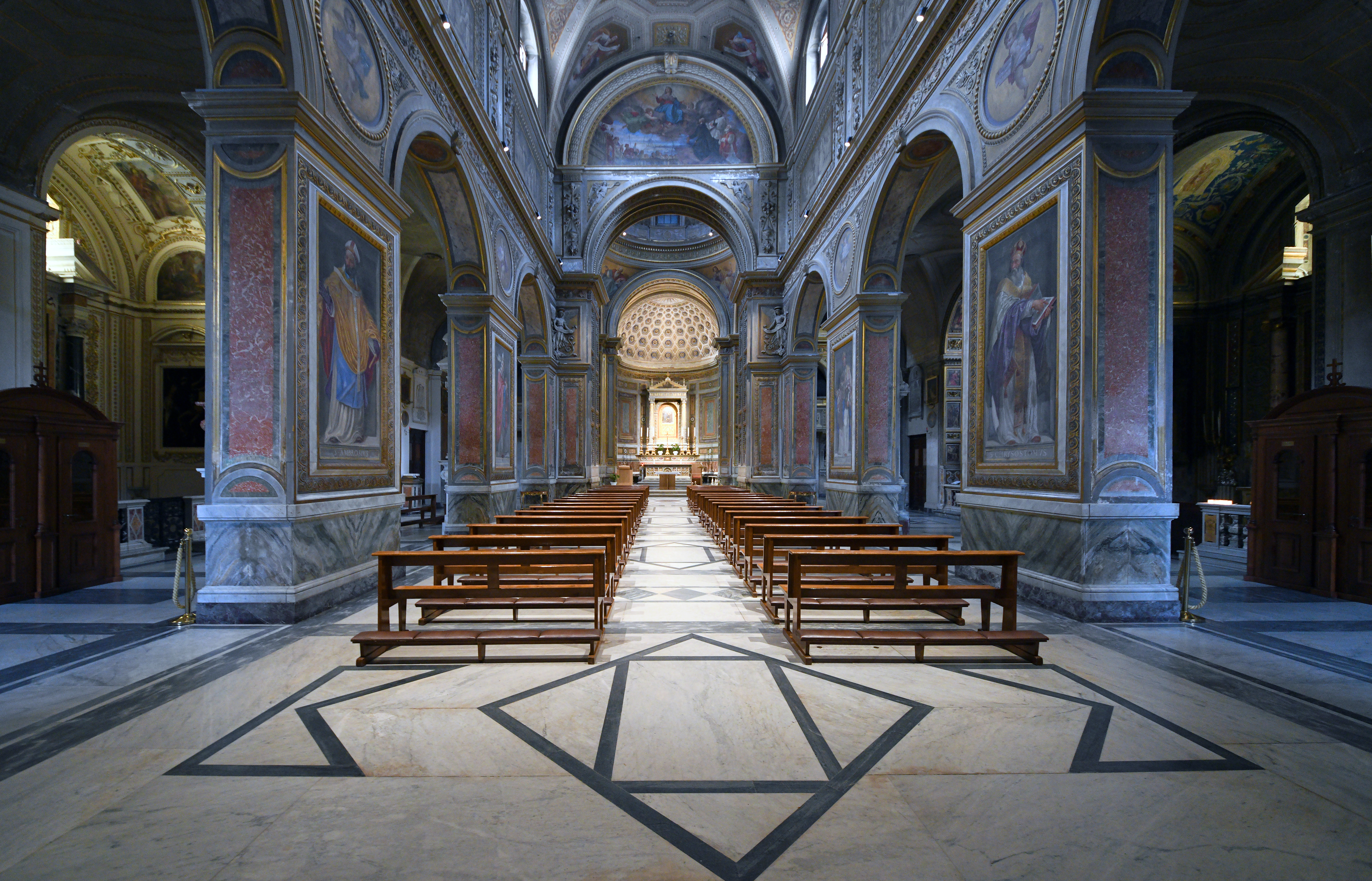
Interior

== Cardinal-deacons ==
Santa Maria in Aquiro has been a titular church since the 11th century. The most recent cardinal-deacon was Angelo Amato who died on 31 December 2024.

- Bertrand de Montfavez (1316–1342)
- Etienne Aubert (1361–1368)
  - Pierre de Fetigny (1383–1392), Pseudocardinal
  - Jofré de Boil (1397–1400), Pseudocardinal
- Giovanni Colonna (1480–1508)
- Luigi d'Aragona, in commendam (1508–1517)
- Guillaume de Croÿ (1517–1521)
- vacant (1521–1535)
- Gasparo Contarini (1535)
- Marino Ascanio Caracciolo (1535–1538)
- Ippolito II d'Este (1539–1564); in commendam (1564)
- Benedetto Lomellini (1565)
- Zaccaria Delfino (1565–1578)
- Antonmaria Salviati (1584–1587)
- vacant (1587–1596)
- Pompeio Arrigoni (1596–1597)
- Lorenzo Magalotti (1624-1628); Cardinal priest pro hac vice (1624–1628)
- Antonio Barberini (1628–1632)
- John Albert Vasa SJ (1632–1634)
- Paolo Emilio Rondinini (1643–1655)
- Friedrich von Hessen-Darmstadt (1655–1656)
- Giacomo Franzoni (1660–1669)
- Lazzaro Pallavicini (1670–1677)
- vacant (1677–1681)
- Michelangelo Ricci (1681–1682)
- vacant (1682–1686)
- Gasparo Cavalieri (1686–1688)
- Gianfrancesco Albani (1690)
- Lorenzo Altieri (1690–1707)
- vacant (1707–1716)
- Carlo Maria Marini (1716–1738)
- Carlo Maria Sacripante (1739–1741)
- Alessandro Tanara (1743–1754)
- Marcantonio Colonna (1759–1762)
- Andrea Negroni (1763–1765)
- vacant (1765–1775)
- Pasquale Acquaviva d'Aragona (1775–1779)
- vacant (1779–1785)
- Ferdinando Spinelli (1785–1789)
- Francesco Guidobono Cavalchini (1818–1828)
- vacant (1828–1832)
- Mario Mattei (1832–1842)
- vacant (1842–1853)
- Domenico Savelli (1853–1864)
- vacant (1864–1868)
- Annibale Capalti (1868–1877)
- Antonio Pellegrini (1877–1887)
- Luigi Macchi (1889–1896)
- vacant (1896–1901)
- Francesco Salesio Della Volpe (1901–1916)
- Louis-Ernest Dubois, titolo pro illa vice (1916–1929)
- Federico Cattani Amadori (1935–1943)
- Pierre-André-Charles Petit de Julleville, Cardinal priest pro hac vice (1946–1947)
- vacant (1947–1953)
- Carlos María de la Torre, Cardinal priest pro hac vice (1953–1968)
- Mario Casariego y Acevedo CRS, Cardinal priest pro hac vice (1969–1983)
- Antonio Innocenti (1985–2008); Cardinal priest pro hac vice (1996–2008)
- vacant (2008–2010)
- Angelo Amato SDB (2010–2024); Cardinal priest pro hac vice (2021–2024)
- vacant
