= Federico Cattani Amadori =

Catholic cardinal

His Eminence Federico Cattani Amadori
- Cardinal-Deacon of Santa Maria in Aquiro
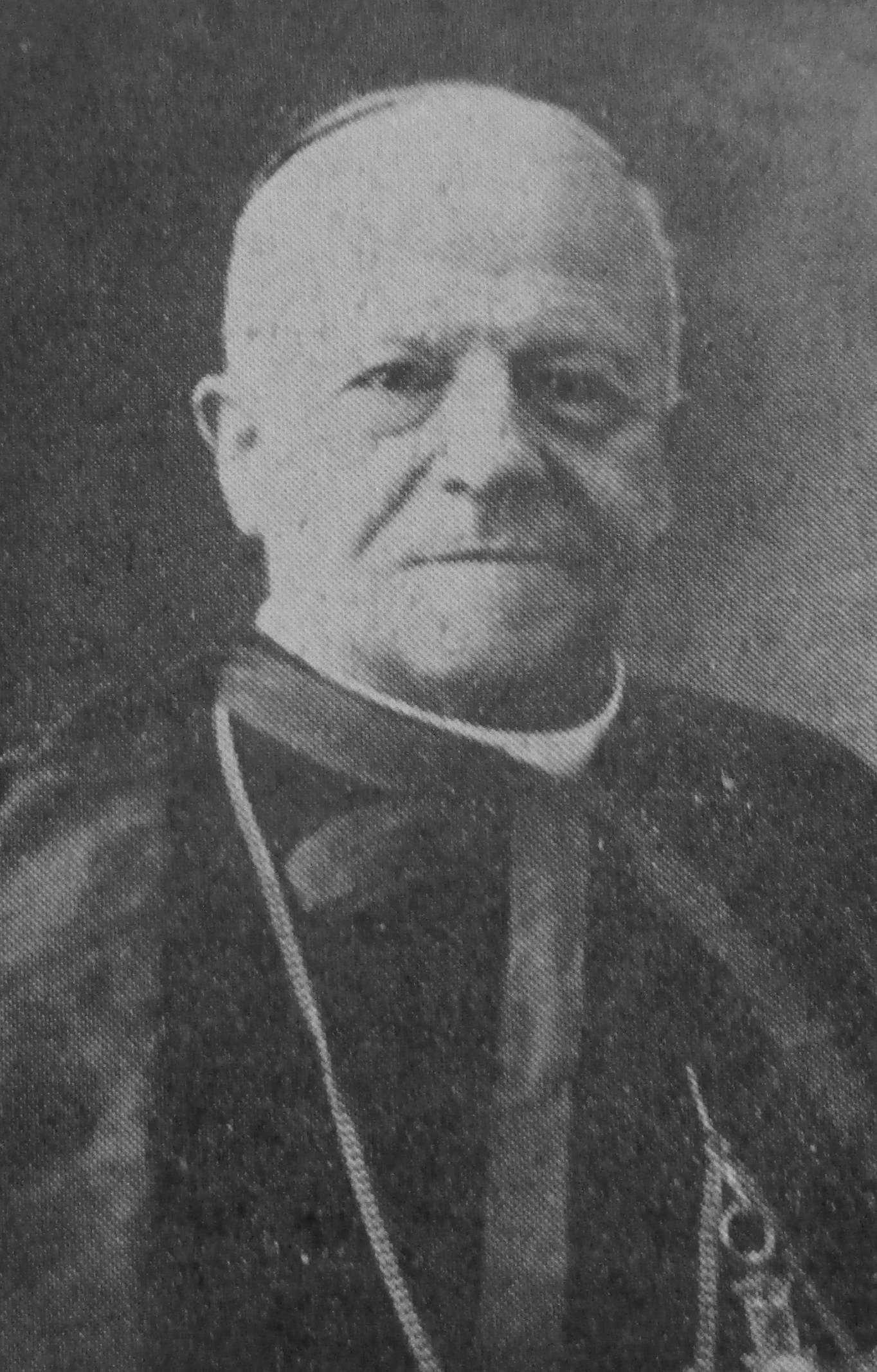
- Church: Roman Catholic Church
- Appointed: 19 December 1935
- Term ended: 11 April 1943
- Predecessor: Louis-Ernest Dubois
- Successor: Pierre-André-Charles Petit de Julleville
- Previous post: Secretary Emeritus of the Apostolic Signatura (1924–1935)

Orders
- Ordination: 5 October 1879
- Created cardinal: 16 December 1935 by Pope Pius XI
- Rank: Cardinal-deacon

Personal details
- Born: Federico Cattani Amadori; 17 April 1856 Maradi, Modigliana, Papal States
- Died: 11 April 1943 (aged 86) Rome, Kingdom of Italy
- Education: Pontifical Academy of Saint Thomas Aquinas; Pontifical Roman Athenaeum Saint Apollinare
- Motto: Respice stellam
- Coat of arms

Styles of Federico Cattani Amadori
- Reference style: His Eminence
- Spoken style: Your Eminence
- Informal style: Cardinal
- See: none

Frederico Cattani Amadori (17 April 1856 – 11 April 1943) was an Italian cardinal of the Roman Catholic Church. He served as secretary of the Apostolic Signatura from 1924 to 1935, and was elevated to the cardinalate in 1935.

== Biography ==
Cattani Amadori was born in Marradi, and studied at the seminary in Modigliana before being ordained to the priesthood on 5 October 1879. He then taught at the Modigliana seminary and did pastoral work in that diocese until 1888, when he was named its vicar general. From 1906 to 1909, Cattani Amadori furthered his studies in Rome, at the Pontifical University of St. Thomas Aquinas (Angelicum) and Pontifical Roman Athenaeum S. Apollinare.

Raised to the rank of domestic prelate of his holiness on 14 June 1904, he was made apostolic visitor to Marsica in 1909, and papal auditor on 9 February of that same year. Cattani became secretary of the cardinalatial commission deciding competence questions between Roman congregations in 1921.

On 14 February 1924, Cattani was appointed secretary of the Apostolic Signatura by Pope Pius XI. He was later named a protonotary apostolic in 1926. Pope Pius created him Cardinal-Deacon of Santa Maria in Aquiro in the consistory of 16 December 1935. Cattani Amadori was one of the cardinal electors who participated in the 1939 papal conclave, which selected Pope Pius XII.

Cardinal Cattani Amadori died from heart disease in Rome, at the age of 86. He is buried in the parish church of his native Maradi.

Catholic Church titles
Preceded by Evaristo Lucidi	Secretary of the Apostolic Signatura; 1924–1935	Succeeded by Francesco Morano
