= Sacrifice to Bacchus =

Painting by Massimo Stanzione

Sacrificio a Baco
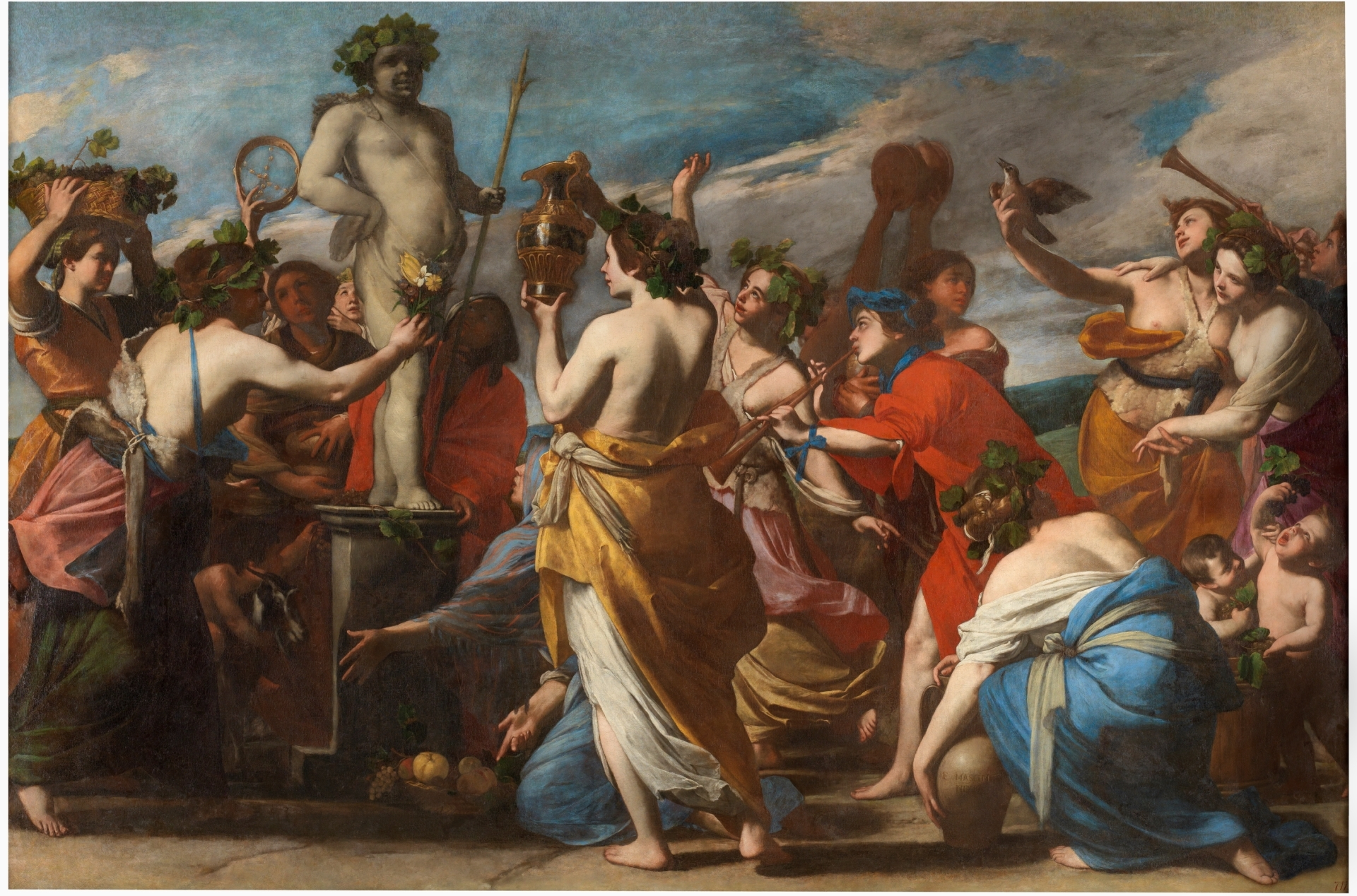
- Artist: Massimo Stanzione
- Year: c. 1634
- Type: Oil on canvas
- Dimensions: 237 cm × 358 cm (93.3 in × 140.9 in)
- Location: Museo Nacional del Prado, Madrid

Sacrifice to Bacchus (Spanish: Sacrificio a Baco) is a seventeenth-century oil painting created by Massimo Stanzione, a painter of the Italian Baroque period, on canvas. Believed to be originally intended to decorate the Buen Retiro Palace in Madrid, it was brought in 1666 to the Royal Alcázar of Madrid. It is currently housed in the Prado Museum in Madrid.

== History ==
Although first documented in 1666 to be housed at the Royal Alcázar, due to its subject and dimensions, it is believed to have been originally commissioned for the Buen Retiro Palace. This is due to the existence of paintings such as Paolo Domenico Finoglia’s Triumph of Bacchus (now in the Prado Museum) and Nicolas Poussin's Sacrifice to Priapus (now at the São Paulo Museum of Art) at the Buen Retiro Palace, both also works of art by Baroque painters, leading to the belief that the artwork was part of a larger group of works depicting older pagan beliefs.

Due to its style, it is estimated to have been painted around 1634–35. This is at the same time as the painting of the Fable of Bacchus by Jusepe de Ribera, and Stanzione's own paintings of four scenes of the life of Saint John the Baptist, which were commissioned from Stanzione for the Buen Retiro Palace. When at the Royal Alcázar, it was displayed alongside the Fable of Bacchus.

It is believed that the painting was commissioned directly by from Stanzione by the then-Viceroy of Naples, Manuel de Acevedo y Zúñiga, the 6th Count of Monterrey, as he was said to be the best native-born painter still residing therein.

== Description ==
Bacchus is the Greek god of wine-making and festivities, and the son of Zeus and Semele. He is usually depicted wearing a wreath of grape leaves on his head and holding a thyrsus. In the painting, a statue of Bacchus is offered offerings by a group of women (also known as maenads) and children, holding flowers and fruit. They are also known as the Bacchantes of Thebes. Herein, they are playing music and dancing frenetically. It is believed that the animals in the frame, the goat (left side) and bird (right side) are sacrifices for the god. Two children are taking grapes from the bucket, one of whom squeezes them to drink their juice.

Stanzione took inspiration from the art of the Italian Renaissance painter Titian, particularly his mythological works depicting members of the Greek pantheon. Two of the three paintings cited as references are The Worship of Venus and The Bacchanal of the Andrians, both of which are also housed at the Prado Museum; the third, Bacchus and Ariadne, is displayed at the National Gallery in London. Although not directly quoted in literature, his reference of Titian's artwork is noted to be visible through the turned poses of the figures, the manner in which their clothes are draped, the focus given to the creation of still life (cited to be one of the standout aspects of the work), the vessels and musical instruments that contrast against the sky, and the intensity of the colours used.

The artist's signature is inscribed on the earthen vessel in the bottom right section of the painting.

== Gallery ==
The paintings that Stanzione modelled his work after are presented below.

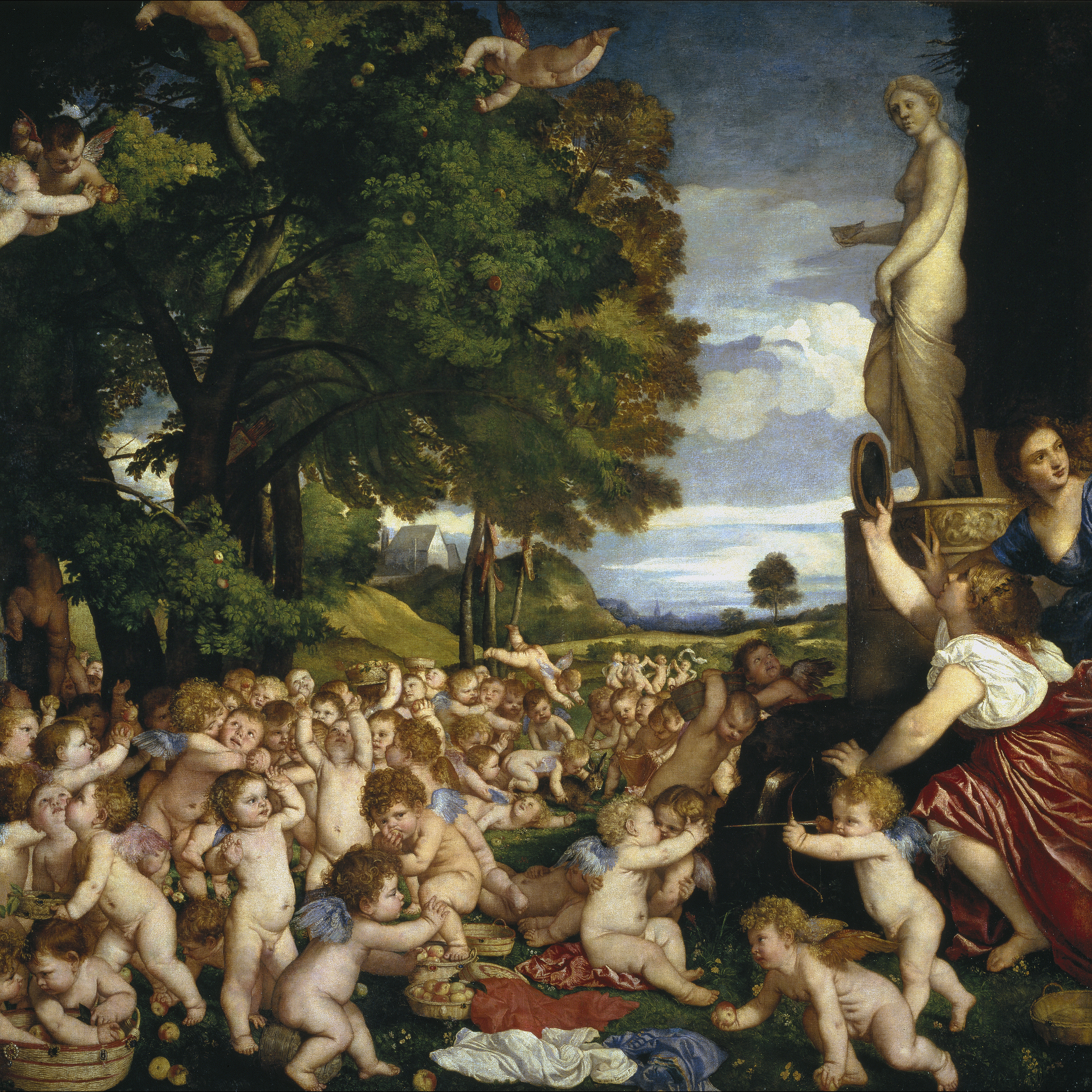
The Worship of Venus by Titian (circa 1518–1519), Prado Museum, Madrid

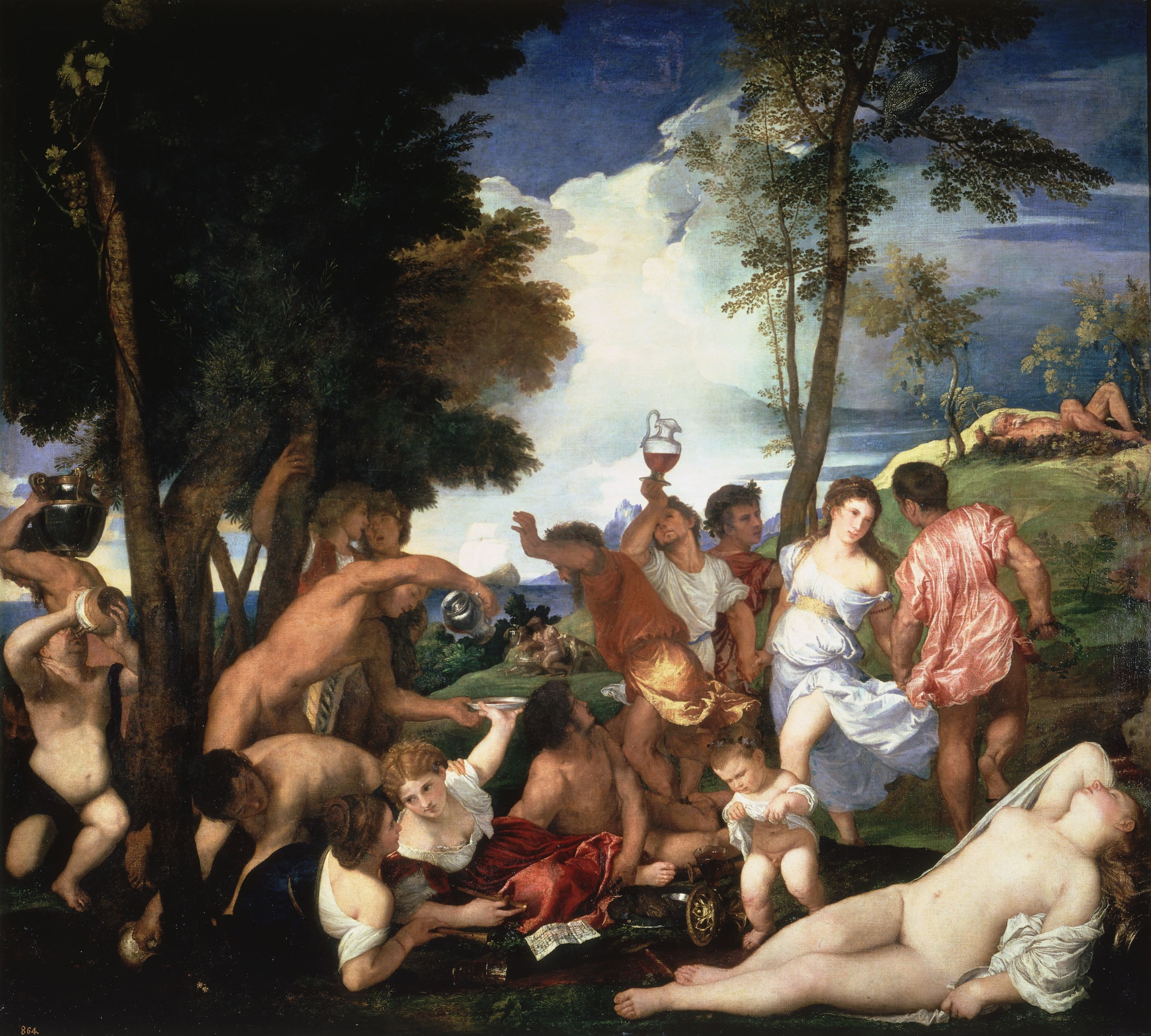
The Bacchanal of the Andrians by Titian (circa 1523–1526), Prado Museum, Madrid

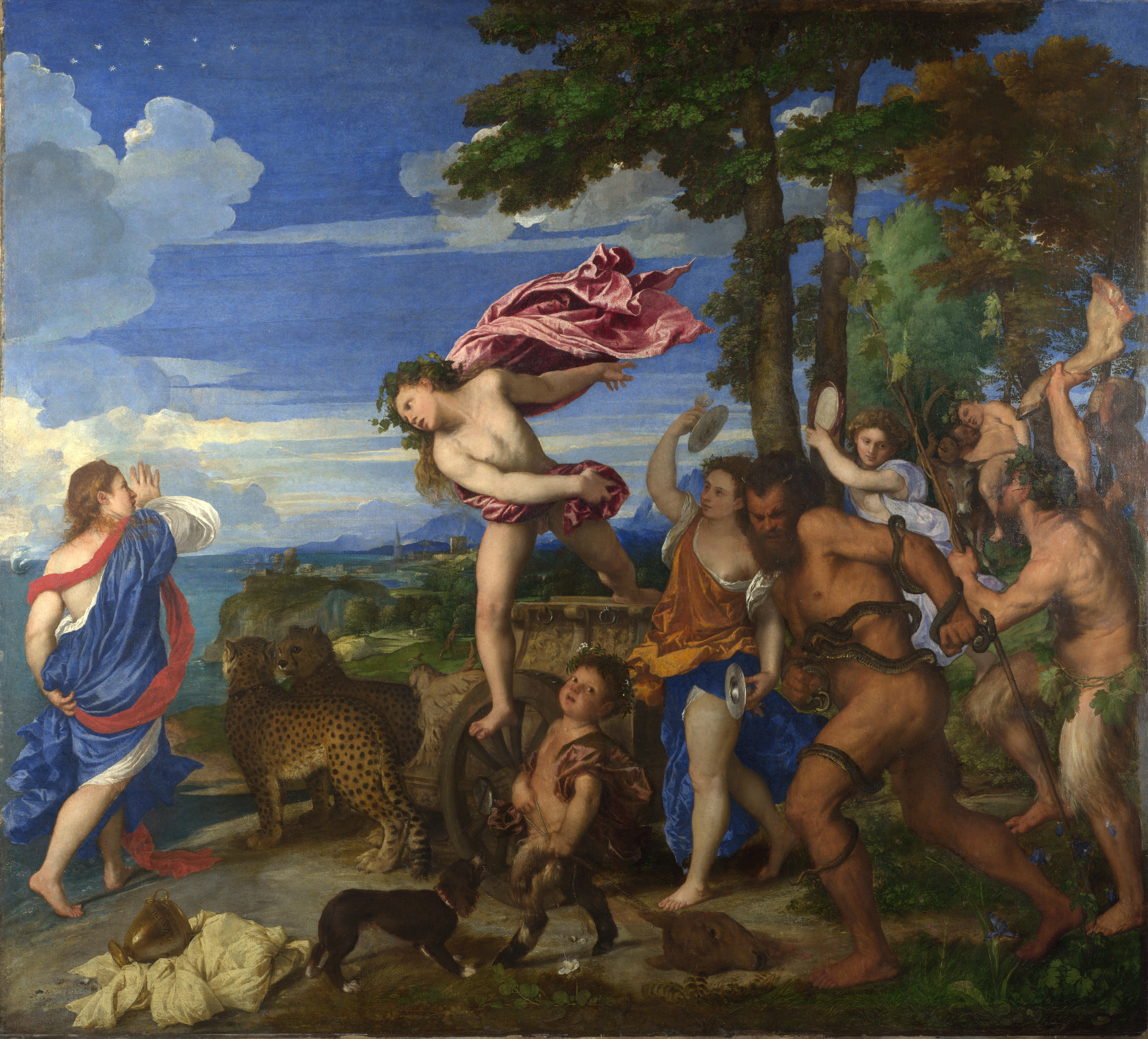
Bacchus and Ariadne by Titian (circa 1520–1523), National Gallery, London
