= Francesco Morano =

Italian cardinal (1872–1968)

His Eminence Francesco Morano
- Secretary of the Apostolic Signatura
- Church: Catholic Church
- Appointed: 20 December 1935
- Term ended: 14 December 1959
- Predecessor: Federico Cattani Amadori
- Successor: Vittorio Bartoccetti
- Other post: Cardinal-Deacon of Santi Cosma e Damiano (1959–68)
- Previous post: Titular Archbishop of Fallaba (1962)

Orders
- Ordination: 10 August 1897
- Consecration: 19 April 1962 by Pope John XXIII
- Created cardinal: 14 December 1959 by Pope John XXIII
- Rank: Cardinal-Deacon

Personal details
- Born: Francesco Morano; 8 June 1872 Caivano, Aversa, Kingdom of Italy
- Died: 12 July 1968 (aged 96) Palace of the Holy Office, Rome, Italy
- Parents: Antonio Morano; Luisa Stanzione
- Education: Pontifical Lateran University
- Motto: Caritas major autem
- Coat of arms

Styles of Francesco Morano
- Reference style: His Eminence
- Spoken style: Your Eminence
- Informal style: Cardinal
- See: Fallaba (titular)

Francesco Morano (8 June 1872, Caivano, Province of Naples – 12 July 1968) was an Italian Cardinal of the Catholic Church. He served as Secretary of the Apostolic Signatura in the Roman Curia from 1935 until 1959, and was elevated to the cardinalate in 1959.

== Biography ==
Born in Caivano, Province of Naples, Francesco Morano attended the seminary in Aversa, and the Pontifical Lateran University (from where he obtained his doctorates in philosophy, theology, and canon and civil law), the Royal University (earning a doctorate and a teaching diploma in physics), and the Studio of the Sacred Congregation of the Council (graduating with a diploma of lawyer of the Roman Curia) in Rome. He was ordained to the priesthood on 10 August 1897, and then finished his studies in 1900. Before serving as an officer of the Holy Office from 1903 to 1925, Morano was made an assistant at the Vatican Observatory in 1900. He was raised to the rank of Privy Chamberlain of His Holiness on 20 July 1918.

Entering the Roman Curia as a referendary prelate of the Apostolic Signatura on 21 April 1921, Morano became a voting prelate of the same on 28 December 1922. He was named auditor of the Roman Rota on 30 January 1925, and later Secretary of the Apostolic Signatura on 20 December 1935. Pope John XXIII created him Cardinal Deacon of Santi Cosma e Damiano in the consistory of 14 December 1959. Morano was the oldest of the cardinals elevated in that ceremony.

He was appointed Titular Archbishop of Fallaba on 5 April 1962, and received his episcopal consecration on the following 19 April from Pope John, with Cardinals Giuseppe Pizzardo and Benedetto Aloisi Masella serving as co-consecrators, in the Lateran Basilica. From 1962 to 1965, Morano participated the Second Vatican Council, during the course of which he served as a cardinal elector in the 1963 papal conclave that selected Pope Paul VI.

Morano died in Vatican City, at age 96. He is buried in his native Aversa.

Catholic Church titles
Preceded by Federico Cattani Amadori	Secretary of the Apostolic Signatura; 1935–1968	Succeeded by unknown
Records
Preceded by Elia Dalla Costa	Oldest living Member of the Sacred College; 5 May 1959 – 22 December 1961	Succeeded by Carlos de la Torre
