= Massimo Stanzione =

17th-century Italian Baroque painter

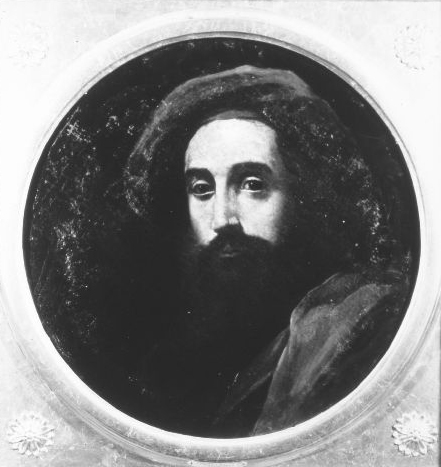
Self-portrait

Massimo Stanzione (also called Stanzioni; Frattamaggiore 1585 – Naples 1656) was an Italian Baroque painter, mainly active in Naples, where he and his rival Jusepe de Ribera dominated the painting scene for several decades. He was primarily a painter of altarpieces, working in both oils and fresco (these usually for ceilings). His main subject matter was biblical scenes. He also painted portraits and mythological subjects. He had many pupils and followers as his rich color and idealized naturalism had a large influence on other local artists, such as Francesco Solimena. In 1621 Pope Gregory XV gave him the title of Knight of the Golden Spur and Pope Urban VIII made him a knight of St. John around 1624 and a knight of the Order of Christ in 1627. From then on, he liked to sign his works as "EQUES MAXIMUS" (Latin for 'Supreme Knight).

== Biography ==
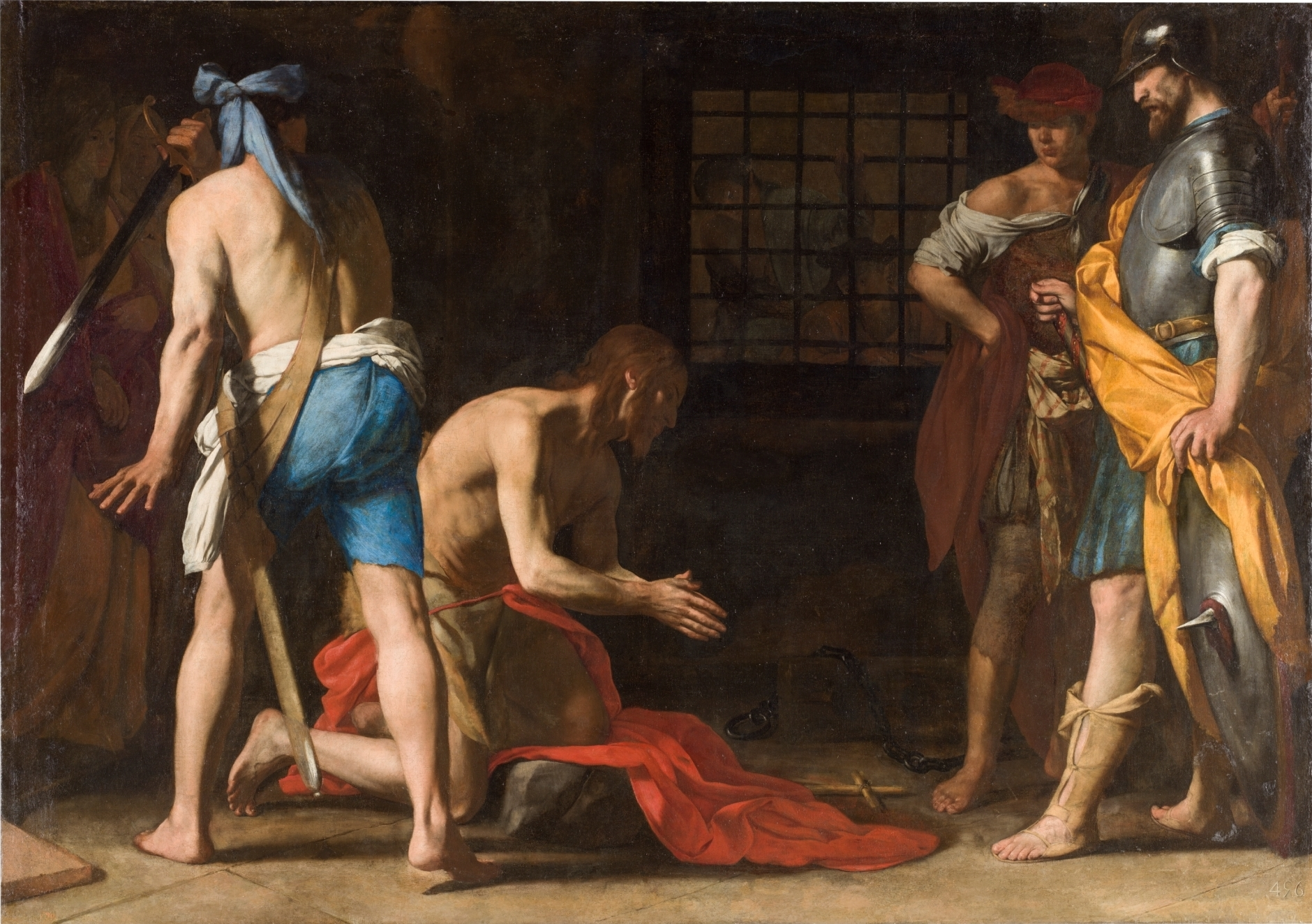
Beheading of St John the Baptist, 1635, Prado

Born in Frattamaggiore or Orta di Atella it is thought that he studied with Fabrizio Santafede and Battistello Caracciolo. Art historians believe that Stanzione developed his career as an artist in Rome. It is thought that he began his career as a portraitist.

His first trip to Rome was in 1617 to 1618, where he worked in Santa Maria della Scala, where traces of his work remain. He returned to the Eternal City several times between 1620 and about 1630. In Rome he underwent the influence of Annibale Carracci and of the revamped Caravaggism of Simon Vouet, among others. In 1621, pope Gregory XV awarded him the title of Knight of the Golden Spur and in 1627, he received the title of Knight of Saint George and Urban VIII invested him with the Order of Christ which, in Spain, gave him the title Caballero Máximo.

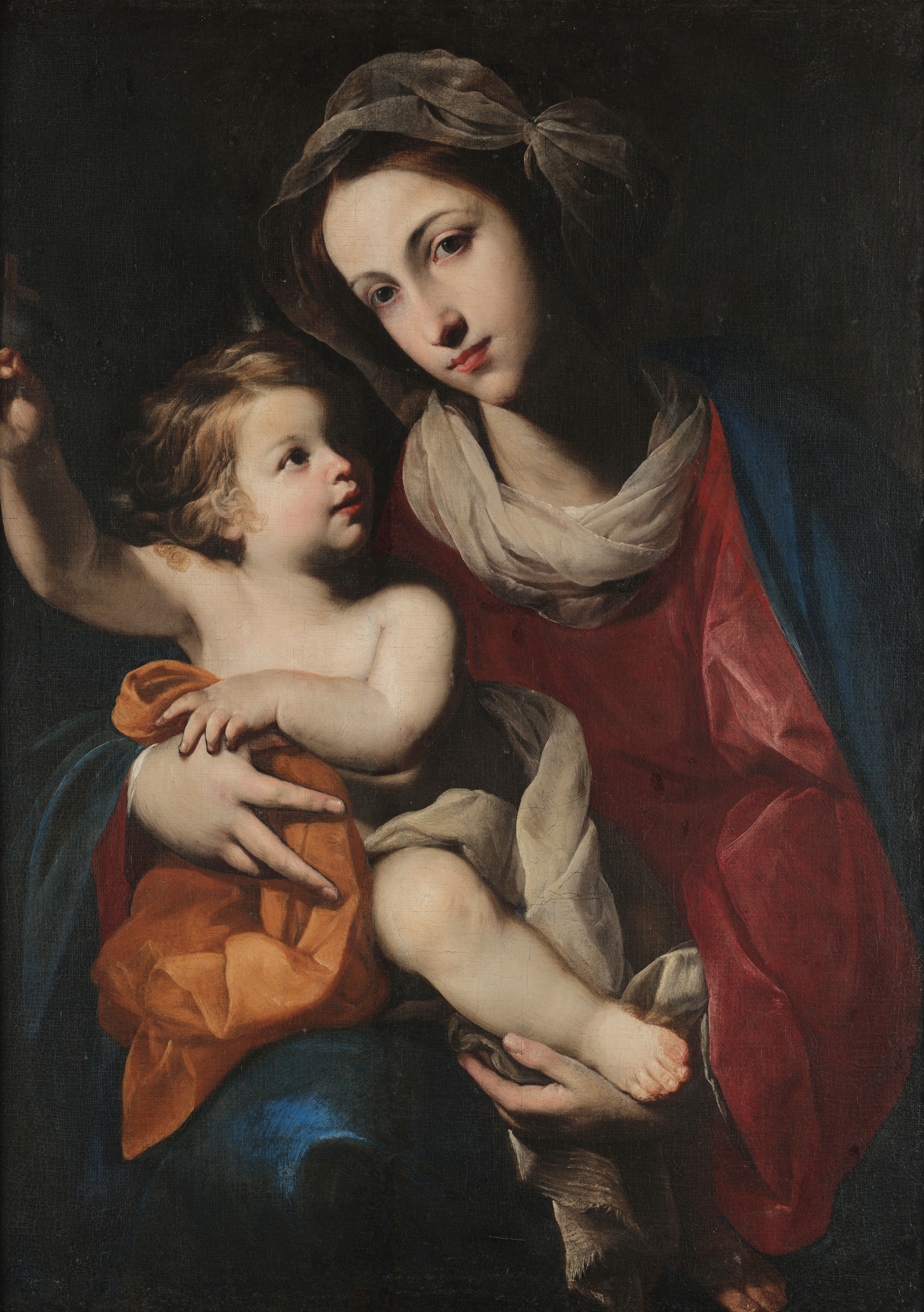
Virgin and Child, ca. 1645, Museo di Capodimonte

Along with Jusepe de Ribera, Stanzione was the principal Neapolitan painter during the first half of the 17th century. This was due to his vast altarpieces and frescoes and of course his following of students and imitators. Stanizione's rich color and idealized naturalism had a large influence on other local artists, such as Francesco Solimena. It is believed that Massimo Stanzione died during the plague of 1656.

Naples was the third largest city in 17th century Europe after Paris and London. In 1630, it was a center of opportunity for artistic commissions. Many of these artistic commissions were sought after by the Spanish Viceroys who maintained positions of political power in Naples at this time. Other art enthusiasts arrived from various Mediterranean ports in Naples looking for artistic expertise. Stanzione along with Bernardo Cavallino and most importantly Artemisia Gentileschi represented a new and more graceful painting style.

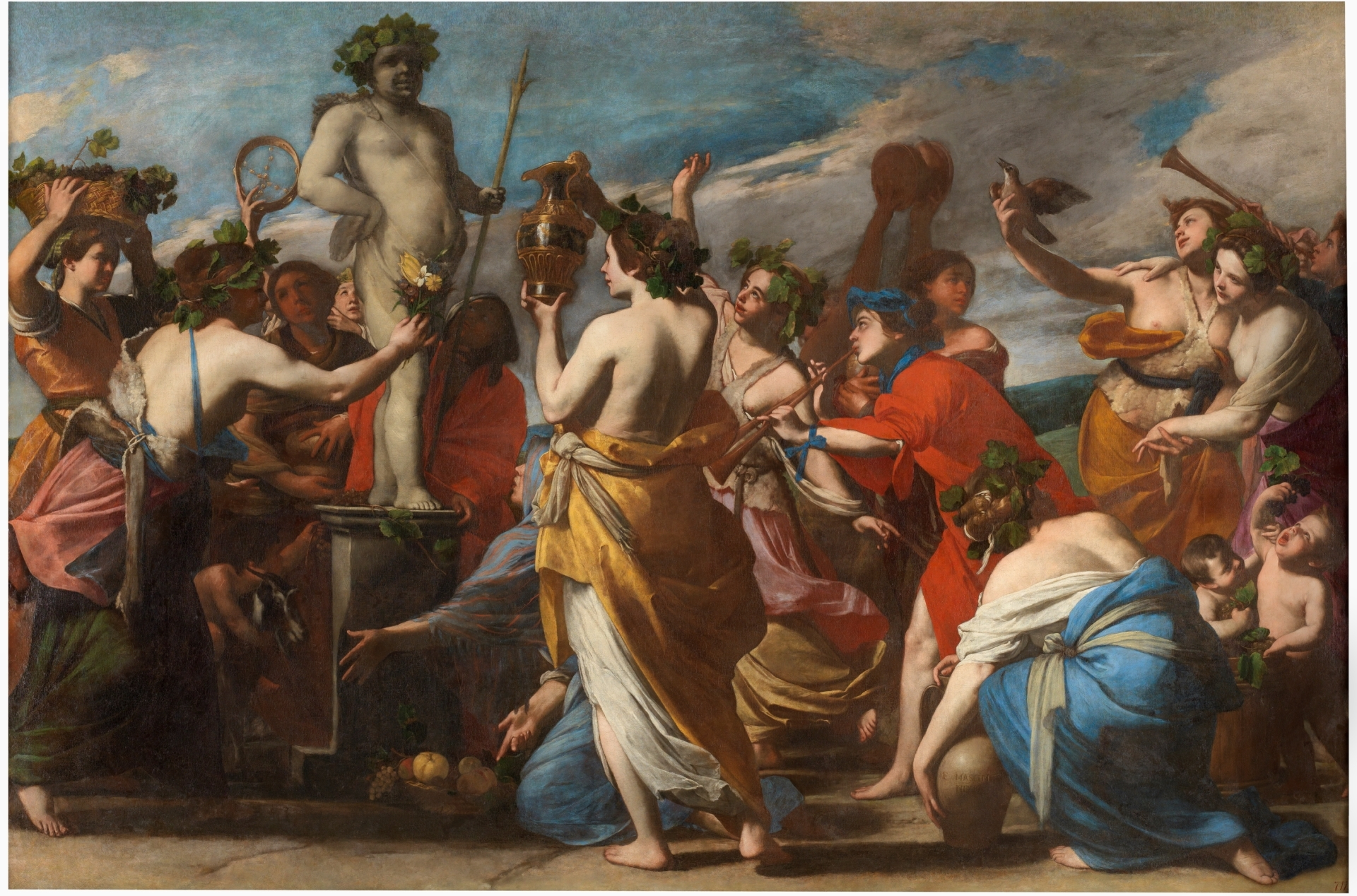
Sacrifice to Bacchus, Prado

Apparently Stanzione’s artistic relationship with Gentileschi was significant in his development as an artist. Documentation shows that Stanzione and Gentileschi both moved to Naples the same year, 1630. De Dominici describes the relationship between Gentileschi and Stanzione as an informal apprenticeship. Stanzione joined Artemisia daily to observe her while she painted. He may have imitated her coloring, but not her design style. There is no written proof to substantiate this hypothesis because the fact remains that Stanzione had a tremendous amount of interaction with other colorists throughout this time and also he was already established artistically in Rome by 1617 when he was working with Saraceni and Gerard van Honthorst at the Santa Maria della Scala, one of the first hospitals in Europe.

Later writers credited Artemisia with influencing Stanzione’s rich light effects and greater classicizing. Gentileschi and Stanzioni collaborated on certain works such as Birth of St. John the Baptist for Philip IV’s Buen Retiro Palace. The two artists compromised their styles; Gentileschi subdued her realist style of tenebrism and substituted it with more even lighting and classical composition, and the two succeeded in creating an agreeable collection. Stanzione’s Saint Agatha In Prison along with his Young Saint John the Baptist were his first known works. Those works combine the influence of Reni and Domenichino among others to create a composition of “lyric classicism”.

He was influenced by Caravaggio. What distinguished Massimo’s art from that of Caravaggio's was that he combined the latter's dramatically lit and brutally realistic style with the classical and lyrical manner of Bolognesi painters, such as in his 1638 Naples Pietà, earning him the nickname of the Napolitan Guido Reni.

== Works ==
- Saint Agnes ca. 1635-40, Museu Nacional d'Art de Catalunya, Barcelona, Spain
- David with the Head of Goliath ca. 1630, San Diego Museum of Art, San Diego, California, USA
- Cleopatra ca. 1630-40s Hermitage Museum, St. Petersburg, Russia
- Mystic Marriage of St Catherine ca. 1630-1640s, Hermitage Museum, St. Petersburg, Russia
- The Assumption of the Virgin ca. 1630-1635, Kress Foundation-North Carolina Museum of Art, Raleigh, North Carolina, USA
- Judith with the Head of Holofernes ca.1640, Metropolitan Museum of Art, New York, New York, USA
- Judith with the Head of Holofernes ca.1640, Museum of Fine Arts, Boston, Boston, MA, USA
- Salome with the Head of John the Baptist ca.1600-56, Manchester Art Gallery, Manchester, UK
- The Slaughter of the Innocent ca.1585-1656, Brukenthal National Museum, Sibiu/Hermannstad
- The Supper at Emaus ca.1585-1656, Brukenthal National Museum, Sibiu/Hermannstad
- Madonna and Child ca.1640, National Gallery of Australia, Parkes, Canberra ACT 2600, Australia
- The Martyrdom of St. Lawrence ca.1630, David Owsley Museum of Art, Ball State University, Muncie, Indiana

== Gallery ==
Selected works

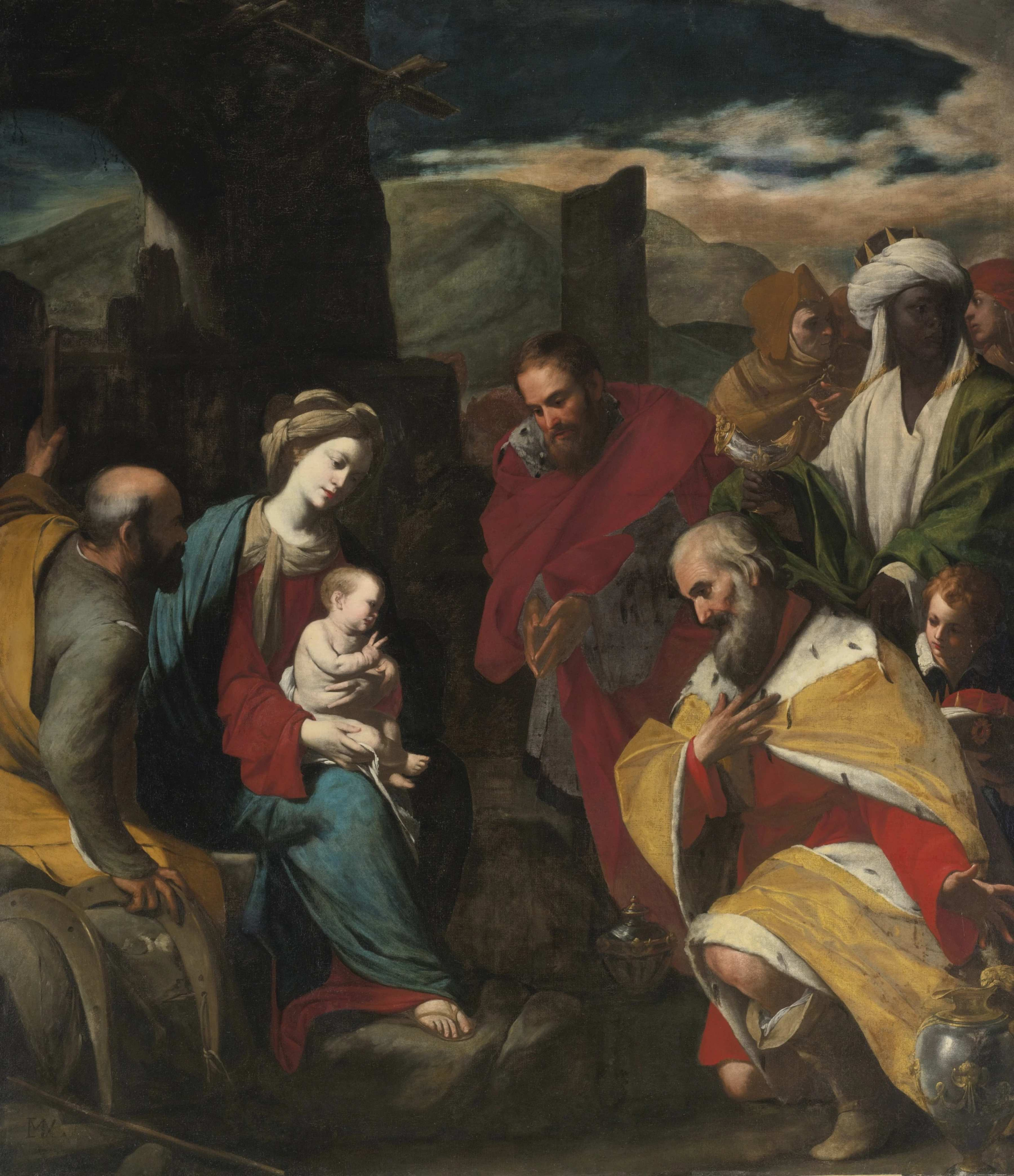
The Adoration of the Magi

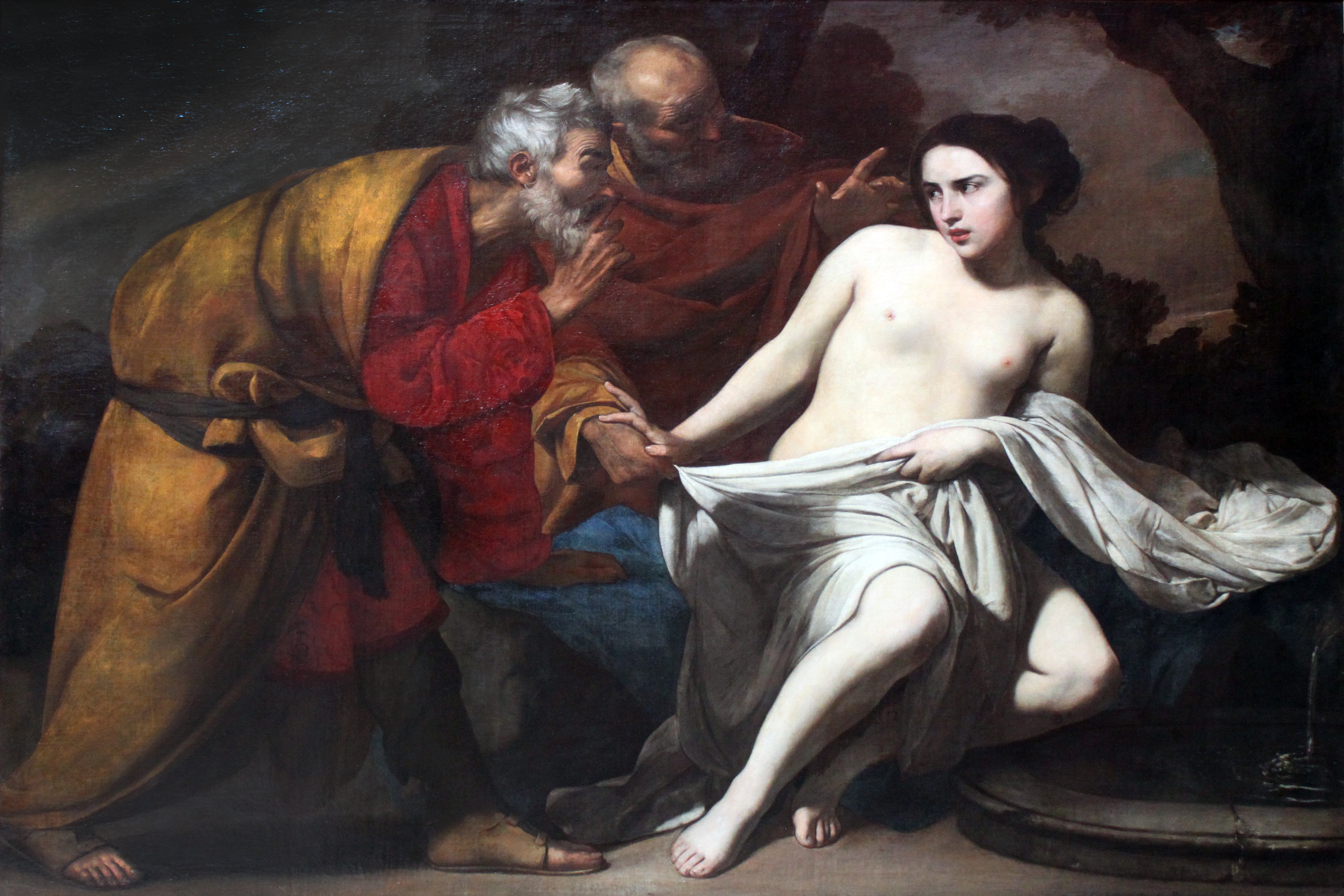
Susanna and the Elders

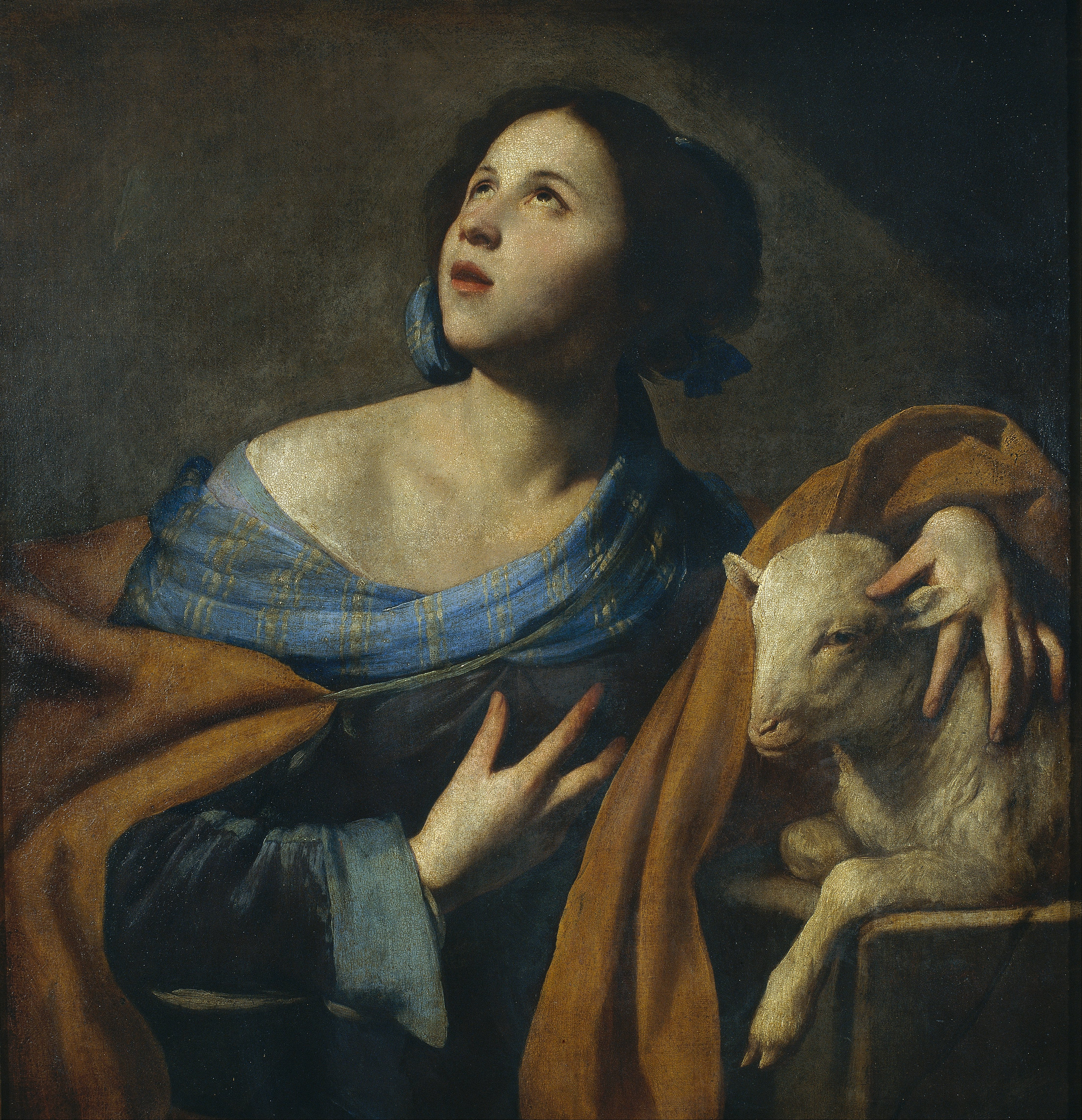
Saint Agnes

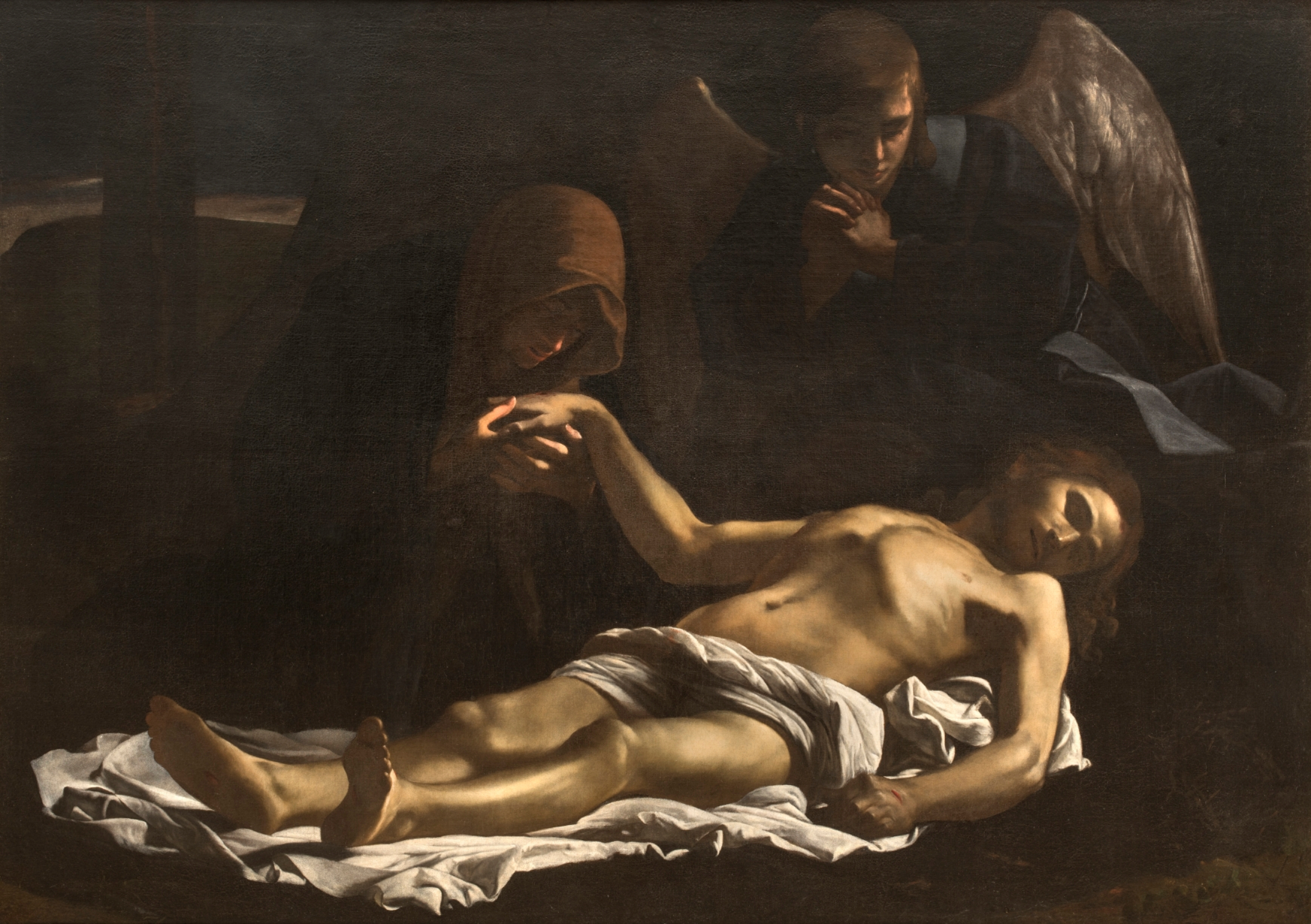
Pietà

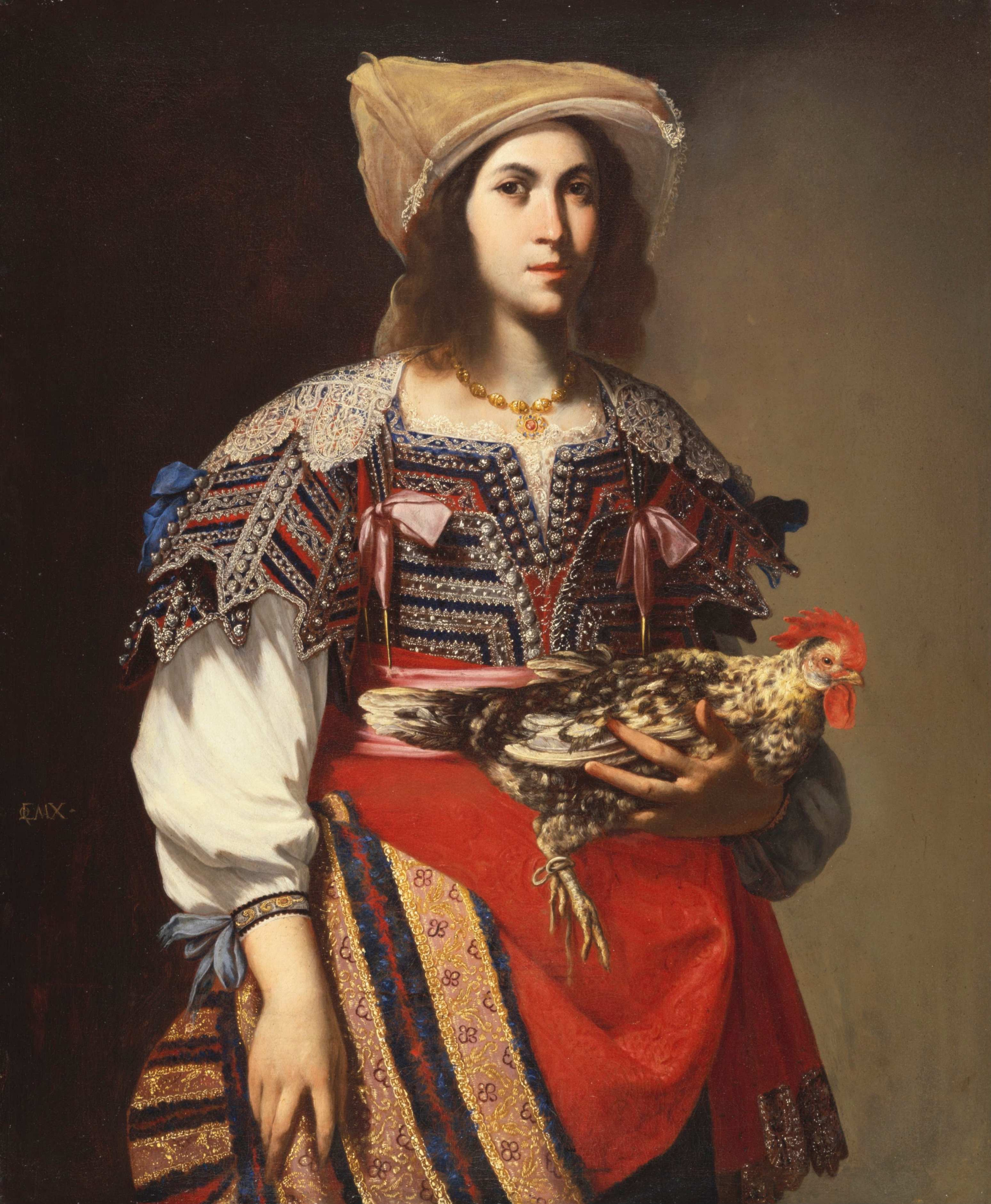
Woman in Neapolitan Costume

== Sources ==
- Lahti, N.E. (1993). The Language of Art from A to Z: Writin Plain English. Terrebonne, Or. 1997.
- Lucie-Smith, Edward (2004). The Thames & Hudson Dictionary of Art Terms. New York, N.Y. Thames & Hudso, 2004.
- Garrard, Mary D. (2006). Artemisia Gentileschi. New York, N.Y. Rizzoli International Publications, 1993.
- Langmuir, Erika D. (2000). The Yale Dictionary of Art and Artists. New Haven, CT. Yale UP, 2000.
- Ribera, José De (2006). Ribera. Naples. 2006.
- Christiansen, Keith (2001). Orazio and Artemisia Gentileschi. New York, NY. 2001.
