= Carlos María de la Torre =

Ecuadorian cardinal

His Eminence Carlos María de la Torre
- Archbishop Emeritus of Quito
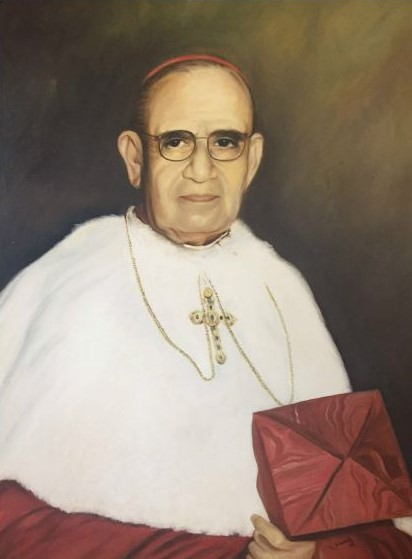
- Church: Roman Catholic Church
- Archdiocese: Quito
- See: Quito
- Appointed: 8 September 1933
- Installed: 8 December 1933
- Term ended: 23 June 1967
- Predecessor: Emmanuele Maria Polit
- Successor: Pablo Muñoz Vega
- Other post: Cardinal-Priest of Santa Maria in Aquiro "pro hac vice" (1953–1968)
- Previous posts: Bishop of Loja (1911–1919); Bishop of Bolivar (1919–1926); Bishop of Guayaquil (1926–1933); President of the Ecuadorian Episcopal Conference (1958–1967)

Orders
- Ordination: 19 December 1896
- Consecration: 26 May 1912 by Federico González Suárez
- Created cardinal: 12 January 1953 by Pope Pius XII
- Rank: Cardinal-Priest

Personal details
- Born: Carlos María Javier de la Torre y Nieto; 15 November 1873 Quito, Ecuador
- Died: 31 July 1968 (aged 94) Quito, Ecuador
- Buried: Quito Cathedral
- Parents: Mario de la Torre; María Nieto León
- Education: Pontifical Gregorian University
- Motto: Obedientia et pax ("Obedience and peace")
- Coat of arms

Styles of Carlos Maria de la Torre
- Reference style: His Eminence
- Spoken style: Your Eminence
- Informal style: Cardinal
- See: Quito (emeritus)

Carlos María Javier de la Torre y Nieto (15 November 1873 – 31 July 1968) was an Ecuadorian Catholic prelate who served as Archbishop of Quito from 1933 to 1967. He was made a cardinal by Pope Pius XII in 1953, becoming the first cardinal from Ecuador.

After finishing his studies at the Conciliar Seminary in Quito, Carlos María moved to the prestigious Pontifical Gregorian University in Rome where he earned doctorates in theology and canon law. He was ordained a priest on 19 December 1896, served as Professor of dogmatic theology at the Seminary where he had been a student and was for a time pastor in Pelileo. Pope Pius X appointed him Bishop of Loja on 30 December 1911 and de la Torre worked as a parish priest throughout this period. Despite his unusually youthful appointment as a bishop, it took a long time for him to advance further: he was only transferred to the more important diocese of Guayaquil in 1926 and promoted to Archbishop of Quito at the age of fifty-eight in 1933.

However, his ability was recognised eventually after World War II by Pope Pius XII in 1946 when he became Assistant at the Pontifical Throne, and gradually over the next decade his long period of service to the Church was recognised though his elevation to the cardinalate at the advanced age of seventy-eight in January 1953 (when he had already been a bishop for forty years). He was also decorated by the Spanish government with the Cruz of Alfonso X el Sabio at the same time and in the following years he began addressing the issue of extreme social inequality in Latin America and the problem of the evangelical inroads that were just beginning to emerge in Latin America.

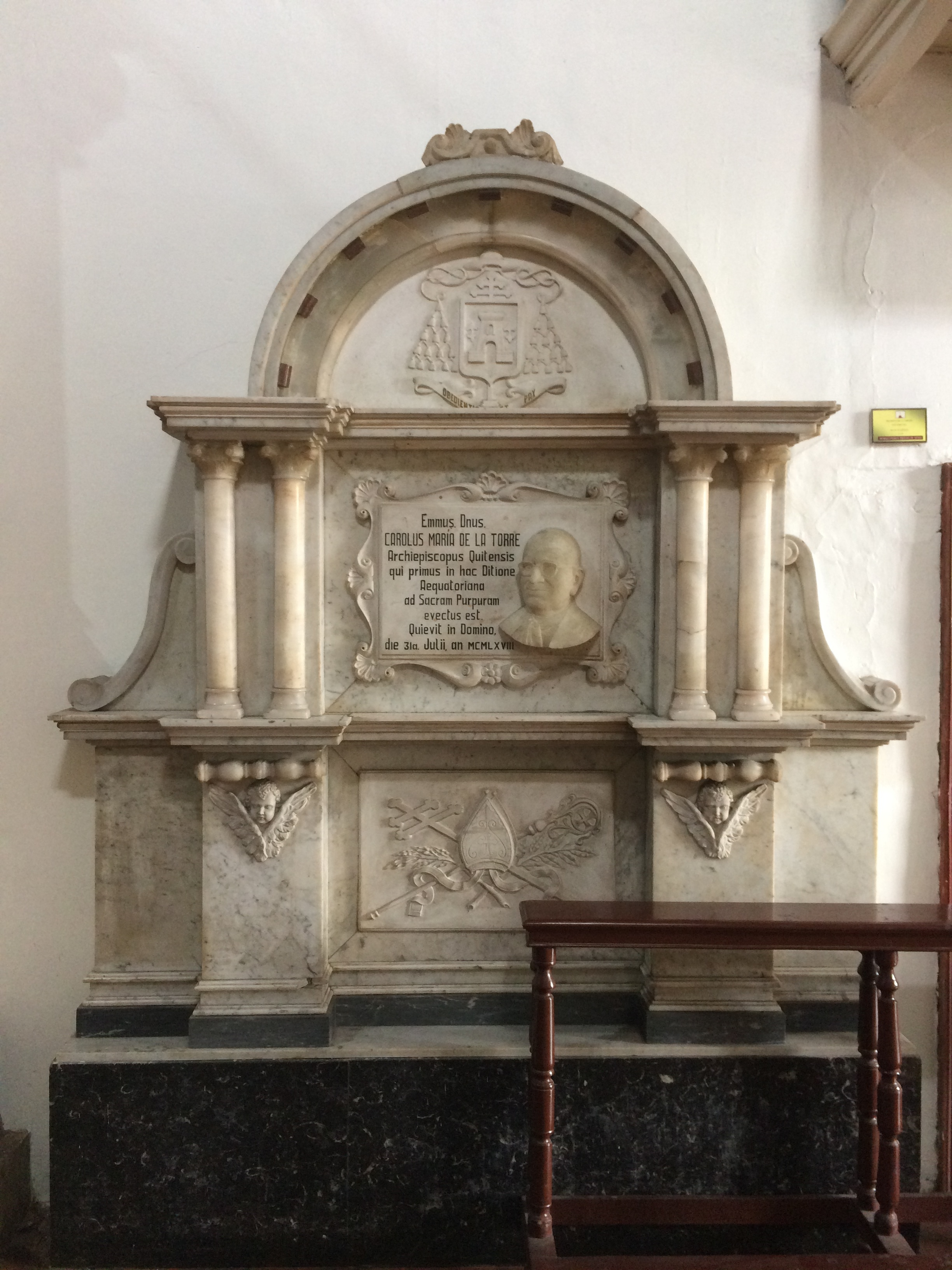
Cenotaph dedicated to Carlos María de la Torre, Quito Metropolitan Cathedral.

Cardinal de la Torre participated in the conclave of 1958 but his efforts to ameliorate social inequality in Latin America were rapidly defeated by his exceedingly advanced age. By 1962, his health was so poor that he could, at the age of eighty-nine, attend neither any of the sessions for Vatican II nor the 1963 conclave. He was the first cardinal not to attend a conclave for health reasons since José María Martín de Herrera y de la Iglesia and Giuseppe Antonio Ermenegildo Prisco in 1922.

He also ordered the commencement of the cause of beatification and canonization of Gabriel García Moreno, President of Ecuador during the nineteenth century.

Cardinal de la Torre died in 1968 at the age of 94 and was buried in the metropolitan cathedral of Quito.

One of his major contributions to Ecuadorian education was his founding of the Pontificia Universidad Católica del Ecuador.

Records
Preceded by Francesco Morano	Oldest living Member of the Sacred College; 12–31 July 1968	Succeeded by Augusto da Silva
