= Frattaminore =

- Comune
- Comune di Frattaminore
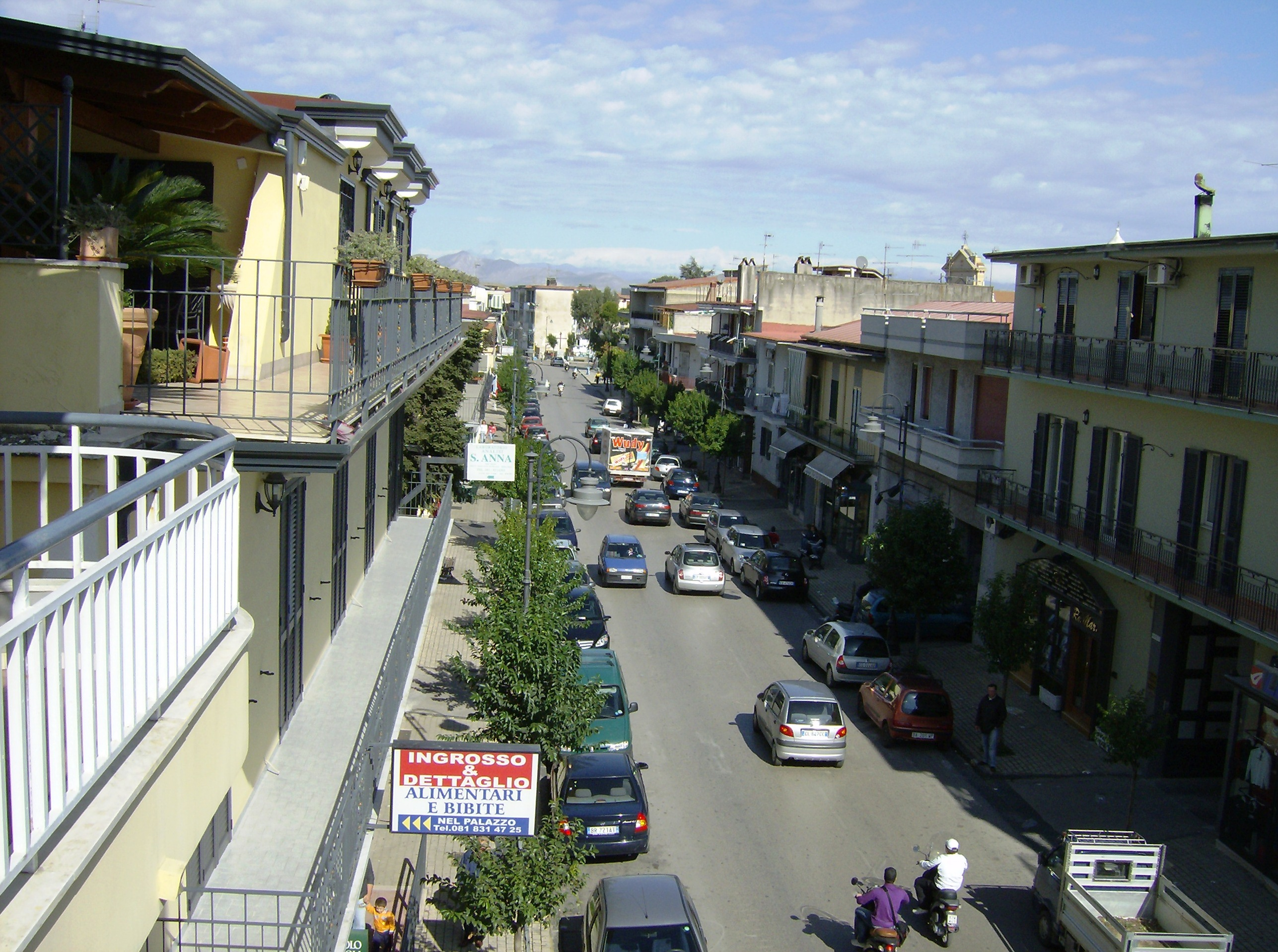

- Coat of arms

- Location within Italy Location within Campania
- Coordinates: 40°57′N 14°16′E
- Country: Italy
- Region: Campania
- Metropolitan city: Naples (NA)

Government
  - Mayor: Giuseppe Bencivenga

Area
  - Total: 1.99 km^{2} (0.77 sq mi)
- Elevation: 36 m (118 ft)

Population (31 August 2017)
  - Total: 16,203
  - Density: 8,140/km^{2} (21,100/sq mi)
- Demonym: Frattaminoresi
- Time zone: UTC+1 (CET)
  - Summer (DST): UTC+2 (CEST)
- Postal code: 80020
- Dialing code: 081
- Website: Official website

Frattaminore is a comune (municipality) in the Metropolitan City of Naples, in the Italian region of Campania, located about 13 km (8.1 mi) north of Naples.

Frattaminore borders the following municipalities: Crispano, Frattamaggiore, Orta di Atella, Sant'Arpino.
