= Cesa =

- Comune
- Comune di Cesa
- Location within Italy Location within Campania
- Coordinates: 40°58′N 14°14′E
- Country: Italy
- Region: Campania
- Province: Caserta (AR)

Government
  - Mayor: Vincenzo Guida

Area
  - Total: 2.8 km^{2} (1.1 sq mi)
- Elevation: 40 m (130 ft)

Population (31 August 2015)
  - Total: 8,833
  - Density: 3,200/km^{2} (8,200/sq mi)
- Demonym: Cesani
- Time zone: UTC+1 (CET)
  - Summer (DST): UTC+2 (CEST)
- Postal code: 52040
- Dialing code: 081
- Patron saint: St. Cesario deacon and martyr

Cesa is a comune (municipality) in the Province of Caserta in the Italian region Campania, located about 15 kilometres (9 mi) north of Naples and about 14 kilometres (9 mi) southwest of Caserta.

Cesa borders the following municipalities: Aversa, Gricignano di Aversa, Sant'Antimo, Sant'Arpino, Succivo.

== Monuments and places of interest ==
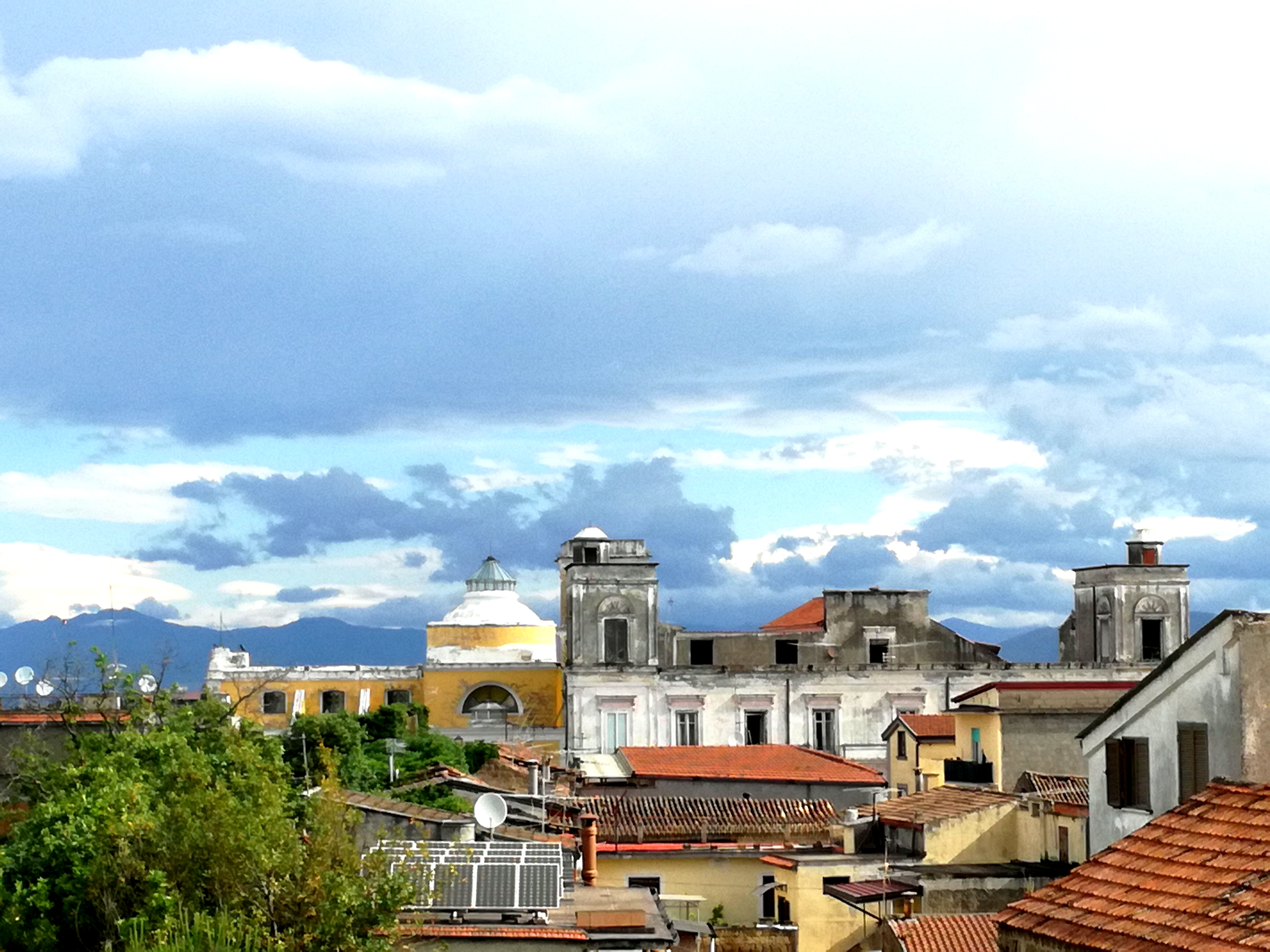
Cesa, view

- Parish Church of Saint Cesario diacono e martire

The Church was rebuilt between 1868 and 1872; the imposing facade overlooks Piazza De Michele (main town Square). The interior, in Romanesque Renaissance style, is divided into three naves and resting on large columns. On the right side of the transept, there is the Chapel of Saint Cesario, where is preserved a wooden bust of the saint which contains some bone fragments of the martyr's arm. On the vault of the central nave there are two significant scenes from the life of Saint Cesario, made by Raffaele Iodice in 1943.

- Church of Maria SS. del Rosario (Our Lady of the Rosary)

The church, located next to the Town Hall in Piazza De Gasperi (the secondary town Square), was built in 1608 and donated to the Dominicans, who built the little convent and lived there until the year 1808. The interior, has only one nave, with a single side chapel on the right wall, with underlying crypt where the remains of the monks are visible.

- Church of Madonna dell'Olio (Madonna of the Oil)

The church is located next to the cemetery. Inside, on the marble high altar, there is a fresco, datable between the 14th and 15th centuries, depicting the Virgin and Child.

- Palazzo Marchesale (Marquis Palace)

Adjacent to the Parish Church of Saint Cesario, the Palace rises majestic and imposing, with its two suggestive towers; it was inhabited by numerous families who in the past were the Lords of Cesa. It dates back to the beginning of the 15th century, it was subsequently renovated and enlarged.

- Grotte tufacee (tufaceous caves)

In the historic center of Cesa, there are 99 artificial cavities located in a few thousand square meters, of which about 60 are real caves.

- Alberate aversane (tree-lined)

The vines are arranged in trees with heights of 10 to 12 meters, forming imposing green barriers.

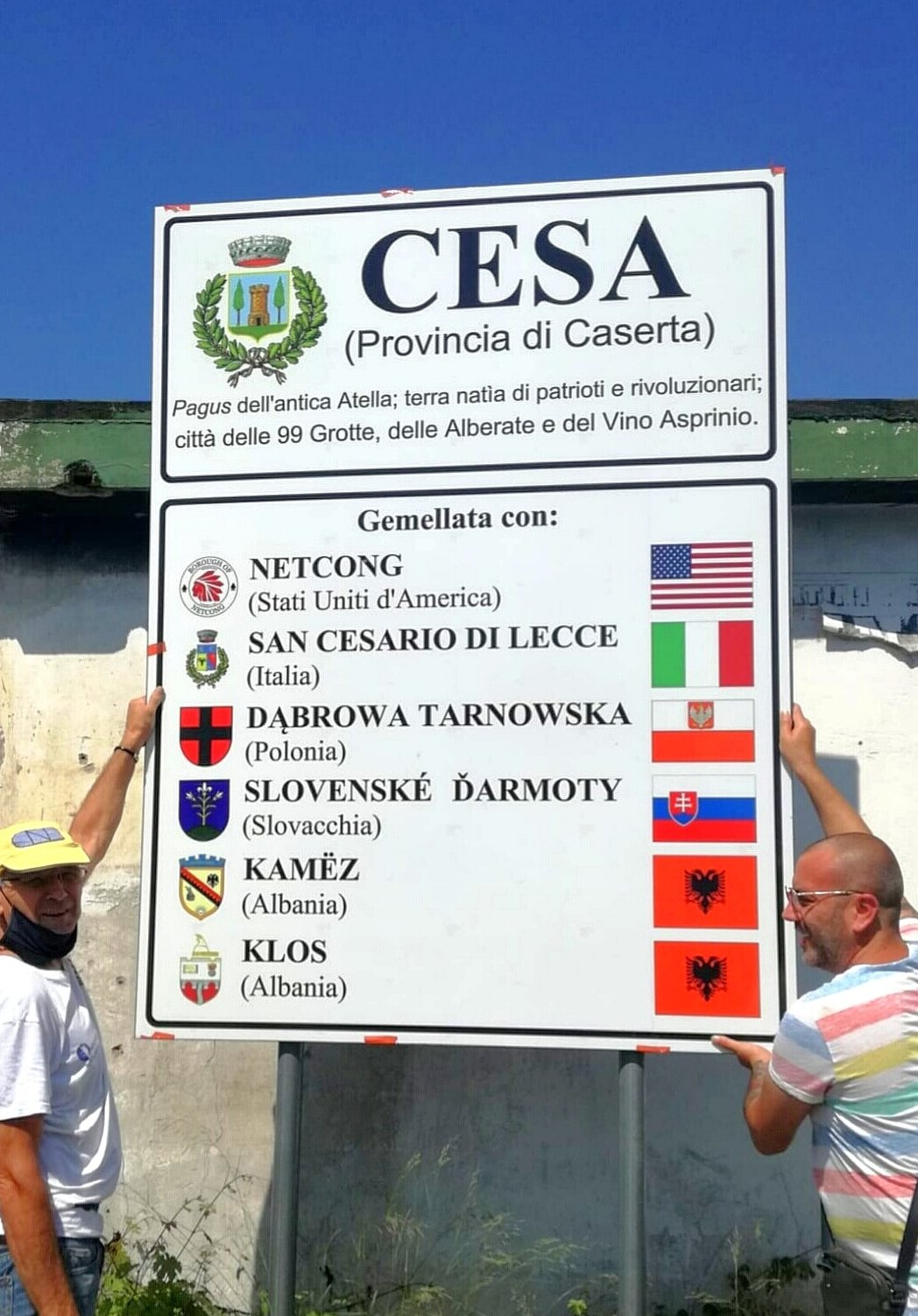
Cesa, toponymic panel

== Patron Saint ==
The patron saint of the country is St. Cesario deacon and martyr of Terracina.

The cult of Saint Cesario in Cesa is very ancient, as can be seen from a document dated 1097 preserved in the Diocesan Archive of Aversa. In fact, there was already a church dedicated to him that, which became a parish in 1572, was enlarged and restored until its complete rebuilding took place, with the offerings of the people, in 1872.

On June 19, 1612 Cardinal Filippo Spinelli donated to the parish of Cesa some bone fragments taken from the humerus of the Saint Cesario (this relic was preserved in the Terracina Cathedral). Currently these bone particles are embedded in three precious reliquaries: in the wooden reliquary bust (1612), in the silver reliquary bust (1760), and in the silver reliquary arm (18th century). In the church only the wooden statue of the saint is permanently exposed to veneration, in the chapel dedicated to him.

== Feast of Saint Cesario ==
The feast of Patron Saint is celebrated the Sunday after June 19 (if this day coincides with the Solemnity of Corpus Christi (feast) the feast is moved to the following Sunday). The celebrations begin the previous Sunday, when the clergy, the St. Cesario Society, the civil and military authorities and the people go to the house of a devotee to pick up the silver reliquary bust of the saint, who is carried in procession between the shot of grenades in the parish church, where he is solemnly exposed to the veneration of the faithful on an artistic throne. During the short procession, outside the town hall, is celebrated the ceremony of the delivery of "the Keys of the City" to the patron saint by the Mayor of Cesa (symbolically the Mayor, as first citizen, the delivery and entrust city to St. Cesario). On Friday in Piazza De Michele, is staged the "Tragedy of San Cesario", a sacred representation of the life and martyrdom of the saint. On Saturday and Sunday - the main day of the celebrations - the statue of the saint is carried on the shoulder in procession through all the streets of the town (decorated with artistic lights), accompanied by the musical band, the exultation of the faithful and the firing of fireworks; at the end is possible to attend the rite of the "Flight of the Angels" (two little girls, equipped with artificial wings, are pulled through a system of ropes stretched from the bell tower to the square to pay homage to the saint with poems) and a grandiose fireworks display. In the following days classical-symphonic and light music concerts are held. The arm reliquary and the silver reliquary bust of Saint Cesario are solemnly exposed on the high altar of the church only this week of the year on the occasion of the celebrations.

== Tourism ==
Cesa, city of 99 caves, is often visited by descendants of Italian citizens who emigrated to America and settled in Netcong or in other cities of United States towards the end of the 1800s., who during their holidays in Italy, with a stop in Naples, Sorrento, Amalfi, Positano or Pompei, visit the birthplace of their ancestors and honor their patron saint.

The primary grape variety of the city is the Asprinio, from which is obtained a wine of a very clear greenish white color, with a light and herbaceous fragrance.

Viticulture in Cesa is unique for its use of growing the grapevines with poplar trees, high up to 15 meters. The wine is stored in large barrels placed in large caves of tuff, able to ensure fresh, correct humidity, light and constant temperature throughout the year. For these reasons, guided tours are often organized to show the large trees and hypogeum environments.

== Pact of Sister Cities between Cesa and Netcong ==
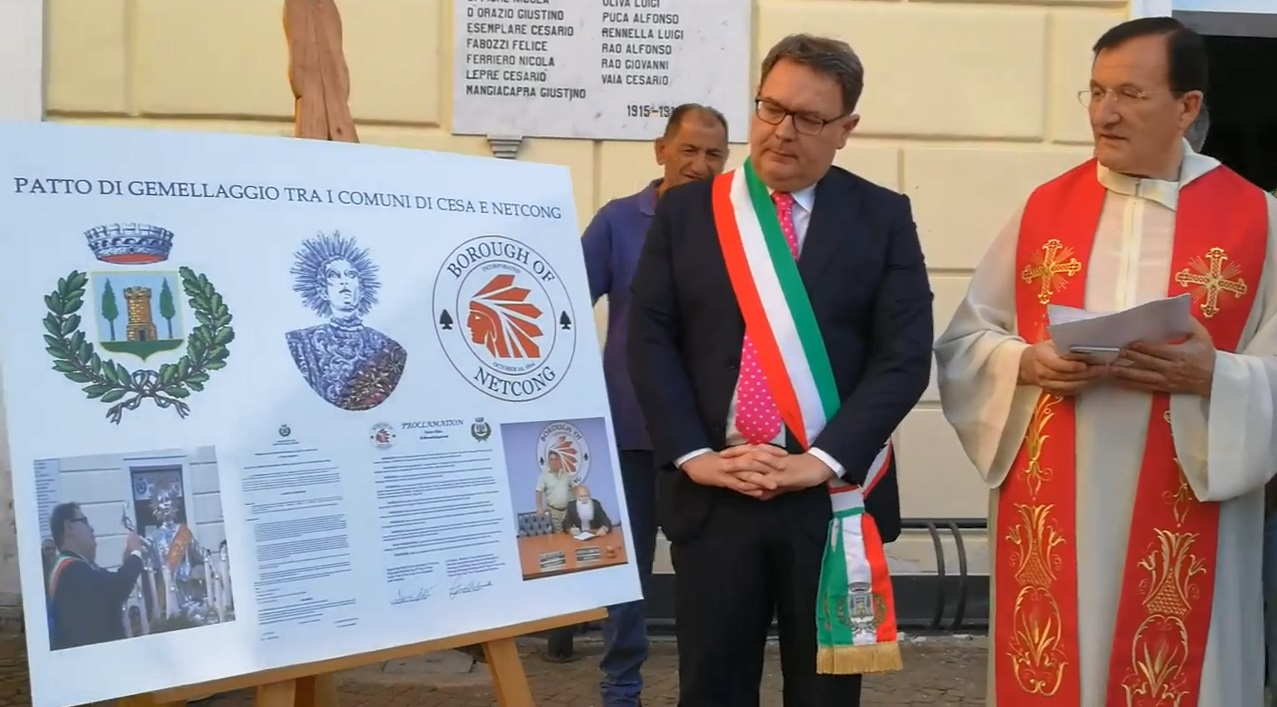
Cesa, Pact of Sister Cities with Netcong in honor of St. Cesario martyr, June 16, 2019

On June 6, 2019, the mayor of Netcong, Joe Nametko, signed the Pact of Sister Cities with the Municipality of Cesa, considering that in 1902, some citizens of Cesa decided to establish the St. Cesario Society in honor of their patron saint (this community even today continues to organize solemn annual festivities). These citizens include: Francesco, Raffaele e Cesario Puco, Antonio Ferriero, Domenico and Giuseppe Togno, Luigi and Giustino Esposito; their names still appear today on the flag that is carried in the procession on the day of the festival of St. Cesario. On June 16, 2019, the mayor of Cesa, lawyer Vincenzo Guida, signed the Pact of Sister Cities with Netcong. The Twinning Pact aims to reinforce the bond that exists between the two communities that share the cult of St. Cesario, so that the history and traditions continue to intertwine, the Italian traditions imported to Netcong and the name of Cesa are perpetuated by future generations in the name of common identity.
