= Evaristo Lucidi =

Italian cardinal

His Eminence Evaristo Lucidi
- Secretary Emeritus of the Apostolic Signatura
- Church: Roman Catholic Church
- Appointed: 8 December 1916
- Term ended: 23 December 1923
- Successor: Federico Cattani Amadori
- Other post: Cardinal-Deacon of Sant'Adriano al Foro (1923–29)

Orders
- Created cardinal: 20 December 1923 by Pope Pius XI
- Rank: Cardinal-deacon

Personal details
- Born: Evaristo Lucidi; 4 October 1866 Montefranco, Spoleto, Papal States
- Died: 31 March 1929 (aged 62) Rome, Kingdom of Italy
- Education: Pontifical Roman Seminary; Pontifical Roman Athenaeum Saint Apollinare; University of Rome La Sapienza
- Motto: Usque ad perfectum Deum

Styles of Evaristo Lucidi
- Reference style: His Eminence
- Spoken style: Your Eminence
- Informal style: Cardinal
- See: none

Evaristo Lucidi (4 October 1866 – 31 March 1929) was an Italian cardinal of the Catholic Church. He served as secretary of the Apostolic Signatura from 1916 to 1923, and was elevated to the cardinalate in 1923.

== Biography ==
Lucidi was born in Montefranco, and studied at the Pontifical Roman Seminary, Pontifical Roman Athenaeum S. Apollinare, and University of Rome. Following his ordination to the priesthood, he did pastoral work in Rome, and served as director of the Institute of S. Girolamo degli Schiavoni for twenty years.

Lucidi was raised to the rank of privy chamberlain of his holiness on 4 July 1900. He was named consultor adjunct for Provincial Councils on 19 September 1902, and secretary of the Commission for the Revision of Provincial Councils on 15 April 1904. Before becoming a papal prelate on 20 March 1926, Lucidi was made assessor of the Sacred Congregation of the Council in 1905. He was named pro-secretary of the financial section of the Sacred Congregation for the Propagation of the Faith on 20 October 1908.

On 8 December 1916, Lucidi was appointed secretary of the Apostolic Signatura, as well as papal auditor and palatine prelate, by Pope Benedict XV. He was later named a protonotary apostolic on 13 December 1917. Pope Pius XI created him Cardinal-Deacon of S. Adriano al Foro in the consistory of 20 December 1923. In 1924, Cardinal Lucidi acted as papal legate to the Emilian Eucharistic Congress in Parma.

Lucidi died from heart disease and influenza in Rome, at the age of 62. He was initially buried in the chapel of Propaganda Fide at the Campo Verano cemetery, but his remains were later transferred to the church of his native Montefranco, which he had helped to restore, on 21 June 1929.

== Trivia ==
- The only other cleric elevated to the College of Cardinals in the same consistory as Lucidi was Aurelio Galli, who died five days before him.

Catholic Church titles
Preceded by unknown	Secretary of the Apostolic Signatura; 1916–1923	Succeeded by Federico Cattani Amadori
