= Succivo =

- Comune
- Comune di Succivo
- Location within Italy Location within Campania
- Coordinates: 40°58′N 14°15′E
- Country: Italy
- Region: Campania
- Province: Caserta (CE)

Government
  - Mayor: Gianni Colella

Area
  - Total: 7.0 km^{2} (2.7 sq mi)
- Elevation: 30 m (98 ft)

Population (31 July 2015)
  - Total: 8,407
  - Density: 1,200/km^{2} (3,100/sq mi)
- Demonym: Succivesi
- Time zone: UTC+1 (CET)
  - Summer (DST): UTC+2 (CEST)
- Postal code: 81030
- Dialing code: 081
- Website: Official website

Succivo is a comune (municipality) in the Province of Caserta in the Italian region Campania, located about 15 kilometres (9 mi) north of Naples and about 13 kilometres (8 mi) southwest of Caserta.

Succivo borders the following municipalities: Cesa, Gricignano di Aversa, Marcianise, Orta di Atella, Sant'Arpino.
