= Sant'Arpino =

- Comune
- Comune di Sant'Arpino
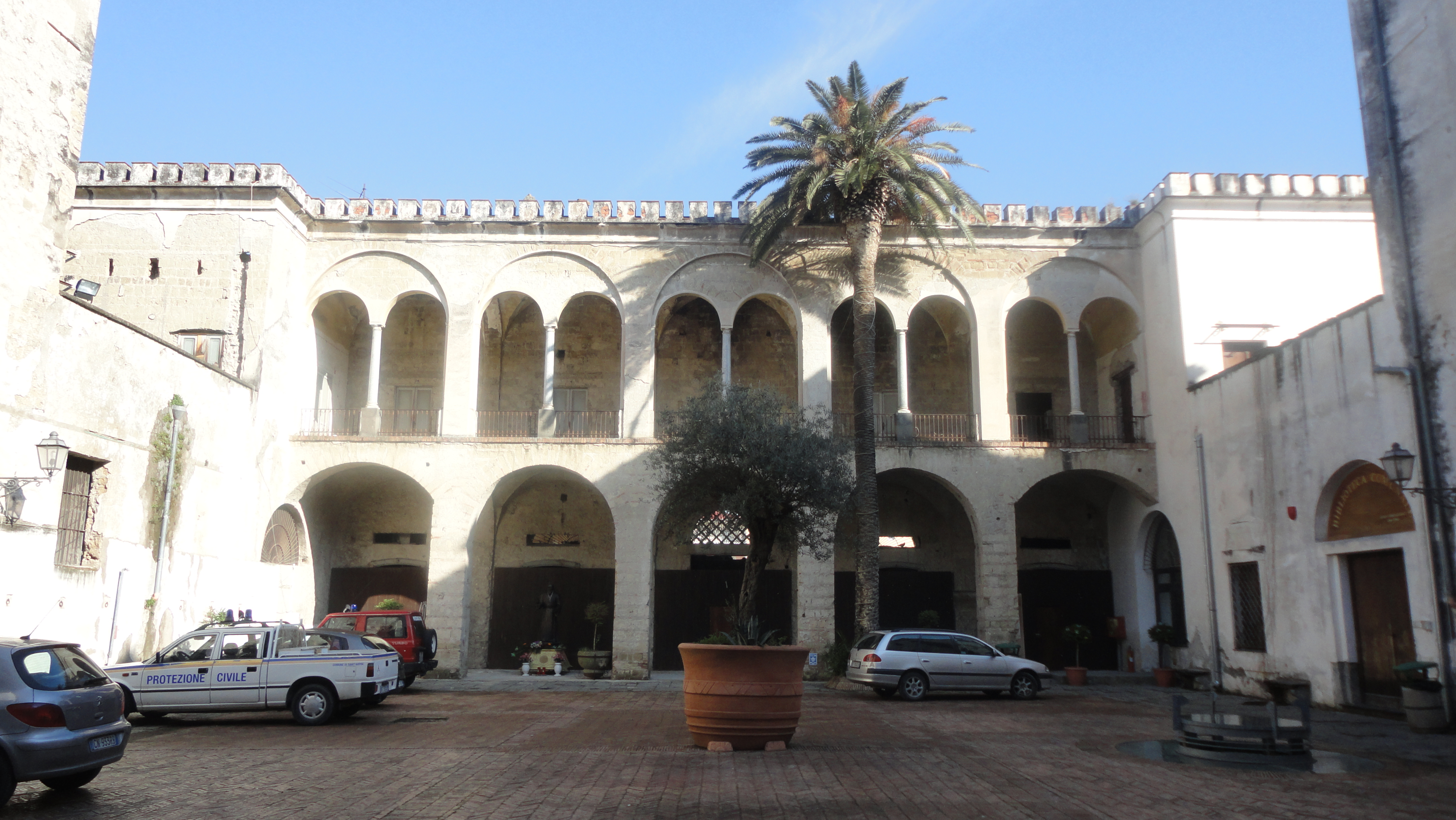
- Palazzo Sanchez Sant'Arpino

- Location within Italy Location within Campania
- Coordinates: 40°57′27″N 14°14′57″E
- Country: Italy
- Region: Campania
- Province: Caserta (CE)

Government
  - Mayor: Ernesto di Mattia (since 04-10-2021)

Area
  - Total: 3.2 km^{2} (1.2 sq mi)
- Elevation: 43 m (141 ft)

Population (31 August 2015)
  - Total: 14,281
  - Density: 4,500/km^{2} (12,000/sq mi)
- Demonym: Santarpinesi
- Time zone: UTC+1 (CET)
  - Summer (DST): UTC+2 (CEST)
- Postal code: 81030
- Dialing code: 081
- Patron saint: Sant'Elpidio
- Saint day: 24 May
- Website: Official website

Sant'Arpino is a comune (municipality) in the Province of Caserta in the Italian region Campania located about 11 kilometres (7 mi) northwest of Naples and about 12 kilometres (7 mi) southwest of Caserta.

Sant'Arpino borders the following municipalities: Cesa, Frattamaggiore, Frattaminore, Grumo Nevano, Orta di Atella, Sant'Antimo, Succivo.

Sant'Arpino is the vulgarized version of Sant'Elpidio, bishop and patron of the town. The ancient city of Atella was located nearby.
