= Frattamaggiore =

- Comune
- Comune di Frattamaggiore
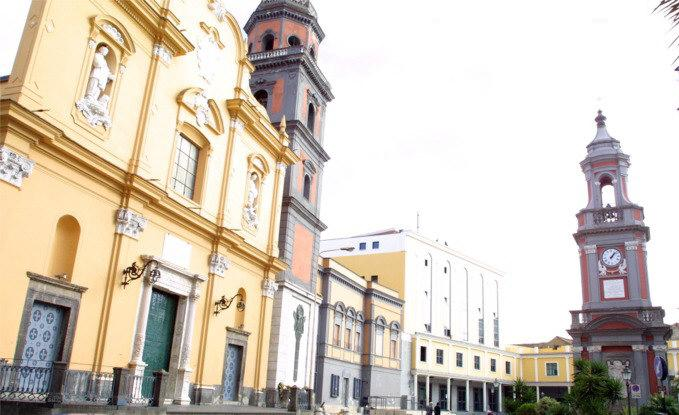

- Location within Italy Location within Campania
- Coordinates: 40°56′N 14°17′E
- Country: Italy
- Region: Campania
- Metropolitan city: Naples (NA)

Government
  - Mayor: Marco Antonio Del Prete (Democratic Party (Italy))

Area
  - Total: 5.32 km^{2} (2.05 sq mi)
- Elevation: 44 m (144 ft)

Population (31 August 2017)
  - Total: 29,929
  - Density: 5,630/km^{2} (14,600/sq mi)
- Demonym: Frattesi
- Time zone: UTC+1 (CET)
  - Summer (DST): UTC+2 (CEST)
- Postal code: 80027
- Dialing code: 081
- Patron saint: St. Sosius
- Saint day: 23 September
- Website: Official website

Frattamaggiore (locally also known as Fratta) is a comune in the Metropolitan City of Naples, Campania, Italy. It is located 15 km (9.3 mi) north of Naples and 15 km (9.3 mi) southwest of Caserta. It was awarded the title of "City of art" in 2008 and named Benedictine city in 1997.

It is located in the Naples hinterland. It is bordered by the comuni of Afragola, Cardito, Crispano, Frattaminore, Grumo Nevano, and Sant'Arpino.

== History ==
The first records of Frattamaggiore date to 921 AD, although the area was probably settled in pre-Roman times. The people of Atella built a watchtower in response to the Vandal invasion of 455 AD, around which refugees from Miseno settled when their town was razed by the Saracens; here they also built a Catholic church in honour of Sossius, now the patron saint of Frattamaggiore.

== Transportation ==
Frattamaggiore is served by:

- Provincial road 162, a freeway that connects the city to the Milano-Napoli freeway;
- a railway station on the Rome–Formia–Naples railway;
- Napoli Afragola railway station on the Rome–Naples high-speed line, 6 km (3.7 mi) from Frattamaggiore;
- several bus lines of the Naples Public Transport Company that connect the city to Naples, Caserta, Afragola, Casoria, Sant'Antimo, Orta di Atella, Frattaminore and other closer cities;
- the Naples International Airport, A104 bis, 10 km (6.2 mi) from Frattamaggiore.

== Notable people ==
- Massimo Stanzione (1585 – 1656), painter
- Francesco Durante (1684 – 1755), composer
- Francesco Lodi (born 1984), football player
- Lorenzo Insigne (born 1991), football player

== Twin towns ==
- Striano, Italy, since 2006
