= Caivano =

- Comune
- Comune di Caivano
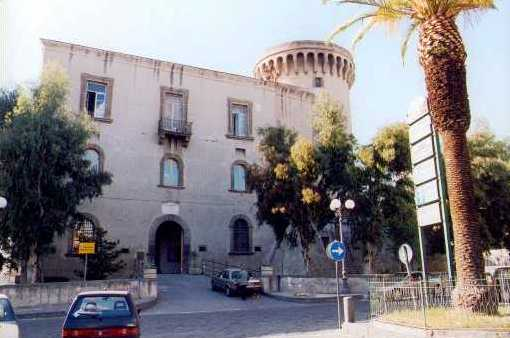

- Coat of arms

- Location within Italy Location within Campania
- Coordinates: 40°57′N 14°18′E
- Country: Italy
- Region: Campania
- Metropolitan city: Naples (NA)
- Frazioni: Casolla Valenzano, Pascarola

Government
  - Mayor: Simone Monopoli

Area
  - Total: 27.1 km^{2} (10.5 sq mi)
- Elevation: 27 m (89 ft)

Population (30 September 2015)
  - Total: 37,874
  - Density: 1,400/km^{2} (3,620/sq mi)
- Demonym(s): Caivanesi, Pascarolesi
- Time zone: UTC+1 (CET)
  - Summer (DST): UTC+2 (CEST)
- Postal code: 80023
- Dialing code: 081
- Patron saint: Holy Mary of Campiglione
- Saint day: 2nd Sunday in May
- Website: Official website

Caivano is a comune (municipality) in the Metropolitan City of Naples in the Italian region Campania, located about 14 km (8.7 mi) northeast of Naples.

The municipality contains the frazioni Casolla Valenzano and Pascarola. Pascarola is home to a large industrial area. There are remains of an ancient Roman theater in Casolla.

Caivano was the first capital of Old Atella; it was replaced by Frattamaggiore.

Caivano has been heavily damaged by the waste traffic of the Camorra. It's one of the main spots of the Land of the Fires. The town's outskirts are one of the most contaminated areas in Europe.

== People ==
- Francesco Morano
