= Pietà (Ribera, Naples) =

Painting by Jusepe de Ribera

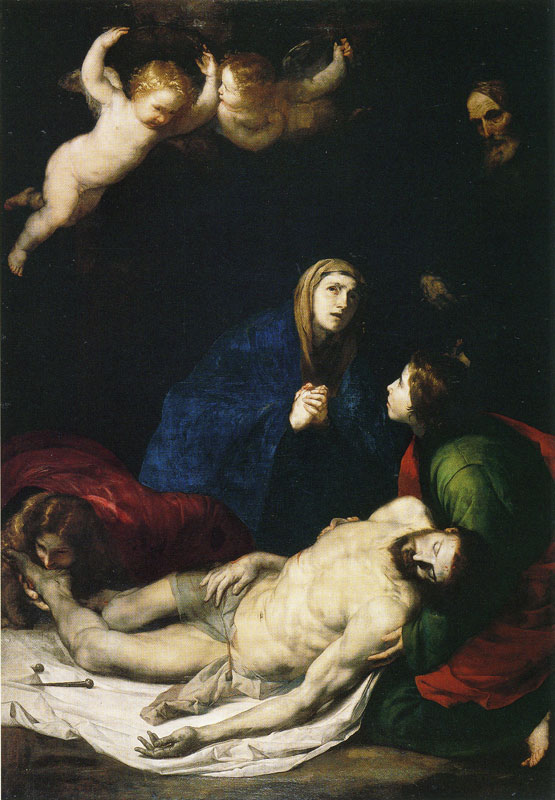
Pietà (1637) by Jusepe de Ribera

Pietà is painting of 1637 by the Spanish artist Jusepe de Ribera, produced for the Tesoro Nuovo chapel in the Certosa di San Martino in Naples, where it still hangs.

== Sources ==
- https://www.nortonsimon.org/collections/browse_title.php?id=F.1970.03.011.D
- (in Italian) AA.VV., Napoli e dintorni, Touring Club Italiano Milano, 2007, ISBN 978-88-365-3893-5
- (in Italian) Francesco Abbate, Storia dell'arte nell'Italia meridionale: Il Sud angioino e aragonese, Donzelli Editore, 1998, ISBN 978-88-6036-413-5
- (in Italian) Spinosa N., Ribera – Opera completa, Editrice Electa, 2006
