= Orta di Atella =

- Comune
- Comune di Orta di Atella
- Coat of arms

- Location within Italy Location within Campania
- Coordinates: 40°58′N 14°16′E
- Country: Italy
- Region: Campania
- Province: Caserta (CE)
- Frazioni: Casapuzzano

Government
  - Mayor: Andrea Villano

Area
  - Total: 10.7 km^{2} (4.1 sq mi)
- Elevation: 36 m (118 ft)

Population (31 July 2017)
  - Total: 27,278
  - Density: 2,550/km^{2} (6,600/sq mi)
- Demonym: Ortesi
- Time zone: UTC+1 (CET)
  - Summer (DST): UTC+2 (CEST)
- Postal code: 81030
- Dialing code: 081
- Patron saint: St. Maximus
- Saint day: 15 January
- Website: Official website

Orta di Atella (Campanian: Ortë) is a comune (municipality) in the Province of Caserta in the Italian region Campania, located about 15 kilometres (9 mi) north of Naples and about 12 kilometres (7 mi) southwest of Caserta.

Orta di Atella borders the following municipalities: Caivano, Crispano, Frattaminore, Marcianise, Sant'Arpino and Succivo.

According to the Istituto Nazionale di Statistica Italia, in 2025 there is an estimated population of 27,420 people. a 37% increase from the 2021 census.
