= Five senses (disambiguation) =

Five senses refers to the five traditionally recognized methods of perception, or senses: taste, sight, touch, smell, and sound.

Five senses or The Five Senses may also refer to:

- Five wits, a categorisation scheme originating in Shakespearean times
- 5 Senses (album), a 1981 EP by XTC
- Five Senses (Pentagon EP), 2016 EP by the South Korean male group Pentagon
- The Five Senses (film), a 1999 Canadian drama film
- The Five Senses (pair of paintings), a pair of oil paintings made by Jan Brueghel the Elder and others in 1617–18
- The Five Senses (series), a set of allegorical paintings created at Antwerp in 1617–18 by Jan Brueghel the Elder and Peter Paul Rubens
- The Five Senses (Ribera), an early 17th-century set of paintings by Jusepe de Ribera
- The Senses (Rembrandt), c. 1624 or 1625
- The Five Senses (Wautier), 1650, by Michaelina Wautier

== See also ==
- Sixth Sense (disambiguation)
