= Esteban March =

Spanish painter (c.1610–c.1668)

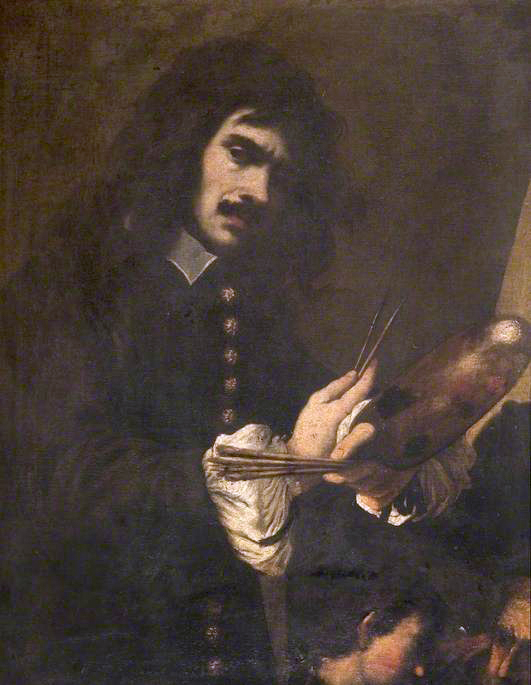
Self-portrait (date unknown)

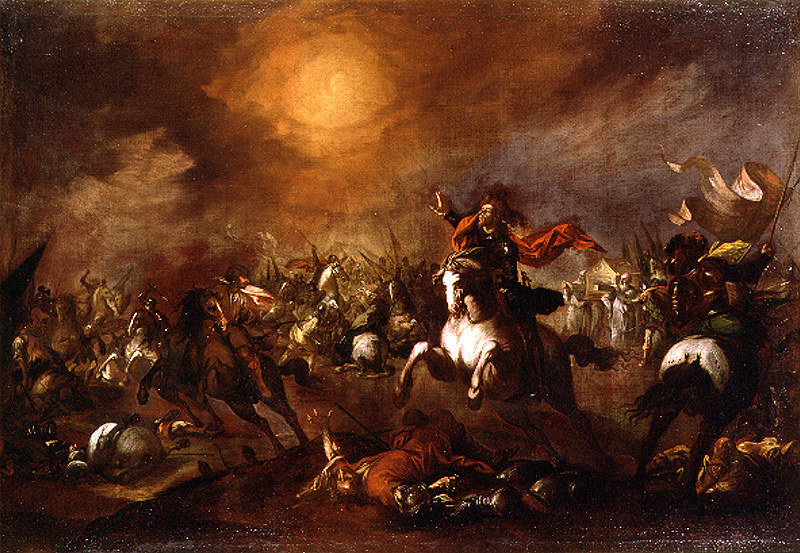
Joshua Stopping the Sun

Esteban March (c,1610, Valencia - c.1668, Valencia) was a Spanish Baroque painter. Most of what is known about his life comes from writings by Antonio Palomino, who lived slightly later than March.

== Life and work ==
His works may be compared, stylistically, to those of Pedro Orrente, which suggests that he may have studied with him during Orrente's stay in Valencia (1638-1645). A depiction of Moses crossing the Red Sea, at the Museo del Prado, which incorporates numerous figures and detailed animals, appears to owe a special debt to Orrente's style.

Palomino indicates that he had a violent and extravagant temperament; based on anecdotes told by Juan Conchillos, one of his more prominent students. Some of this aggressive, nervous character is reflected in his battle paintings, which are his best known and most admired works. It is said that he had to work himself into a fury with martial music before beginning to paint. His interest in battlefields is also reflected in his paintings of Biblical scenes; notably two at the Museu de Belles Arts de València, which depict Joshua Stopping the Sun and the Triumph of David. There is also some indication that he was familiar with the works of Italian battle painters, such as Aniello Falcone, Salvator Rosa and Antonio Tempesta.

His religious works include a Last Supper in the communion chapel at the Iglesia de los Santos Juanes and a Calvary, in a private collection in Madrid. Again, his style owes much to Orrente.

His drawings are also significant. These include a self-portrait, a portrait of his son, Miguel, and several studies of hands and knees from the collection of Raimon Casellas.

Although Palomino gives his year of death as 1660, he is referred to as still being alive in writings by José García Hidalgo, who visited Valencia in 1662 and 1667 and probably met with him.

== Sources ==
- Madrazo, Pedro de (1872). Catálogo Descriptivo e Histórico del Museo del Prado de Madrid (Parte Primera: Escuelas Italianas y Españolas. Calle del Duque de Osuna #3; Original from Oxford University, Digitized May 1, 2007: M. Rivadeneyra. pp. 438–439. "Catalogo Prado Madrazo."
- Palomino, Antonio (1988). El museo pictórico y escala óptica III, El Parnaso español pintoresco laureado. Madrid: Aguilar. ISBN 84-03-88005-7.
- VV. AA. (1996). Cinco siglos de pintura valenciana. Obras del Museo de Bellas Artes de Valencia. Valencia: Museo de Bellas Artes-Fundación Central Hispano. ISBN 84-920722-6-1.
- Pérez Sánchez, Alfonso E. (1992). Baroque Painting in Spain, 1600-1750 (Pintura barroca en España 1600-1750). Madrid: Ediciones Cátedra S.A. ISBN 84-376-0994-1.
