= Sixth Sense =

Sixth Sense or variants may refer to:

- Extrasensory perception, or sixth sense, a claimed paranormal ability

== Arts and entertainment ==
=== Film ===
- The Sixth Sense, a 1999 film

=== Television ===
==== Television series ====
- The Sixth Sense (American TV series), 1972
- The Sixth Sense (Thai TV series), 2012–2013
- Sixth Sense (South Korean TV program), a 2020 variety show
- Sixth Sense (game show), a 2018 Indian TV series

==== Television episodes ====
- "A Sixth Sense", 24 Hours in Police Custody series 3, episode 5
- "A Sixth Sense", The Haves and the Have Nots season 7, episode 18
- "Sixth Sense", Death Valley Days season 2, episode 16
- "Sixth Sense", Hart to Hart season 1, episode 18
- "Sixth Sense", Paranormal State season 1, episode 1
- "Sixth Sense", Police Woman season 4, episode 15
- "Sixth Sense", Supersense episode 1
- "Sixth Sense", ThunderCats (1985 TV series) season 1, episode 26
- "The Sixth Sense", First Love (2022 TV series) episode 6
- "The Sixth Sense", Give My Head Peace series 5, episode 4
- "The Sixth Sense", Happy Days season 8, episode 9
- "The Sixth Sense", Mine episode 5

=== Literature ===
- "The Sixth Sense", an 1898 short story by Margaret Sutton Briscoe
- The Sixth Sense, a 1905 novel by Adeline Sergeant
- The Sixth Sense: Its Cultivation and Use, a 1911 non-fiction book by Charles Brent
- The Sixth Sense, a 1915 novel by Stephen McKenna
- The Sixth Sense, a 1965 novel by Konrad Bayer
- Pisces: Sixth Sense, a 1995 novel by Jahnna N. Malcolm
- The Sixth Sense, a novelization of the 1999 film by Peter Lerangis

=== Music ===
- Sixth Sense, a music act associated with Storyhill

==== Albums ====
- Sixth Sense (Brown Eyed Girls album), 2011
- The Sixth Sense (soundtrack), 1999
- The Sixth Sense (Lee Morgan album), 1968
- The Sixth Sense (Don Pullen album), 1985
- The Sixth Sense, a 2013 album by Ai Kuwabara
- El Sexto Sentido ('The Sixth Sense'), a 2006 album by Thalía

==== Songs ====
- "Sixth Sense" (Brown Eyed Girls song), 2011
- "The 6th Sense", a 2000 song by Common
- "Sixth Sense", a song by Chicago from the 1975 album Chicago VIII
- "Sixth Sense", a song by Ofra Haza from the 1997 album Ofra Haza
- "Sixth Sense", a song by Royal Hunt from the 2010 album X
- "Sixth Sense", a song by Donna Lewis from the 2002 album Be Still
- "Sixth Sense", a song by Imelda May from the 2017 album Life Love Flesh Blood
- "Sixth Sense", a song by Wire from the 1990 album Manscape

=== Radio ===
- Sixx Sense, an American radio show hosted by Nikki Sixx

== Computing ==
- SixthSense, a 1990s gesture-based wearable computer system
- HTC Sense version 6, nicknamed "Sixth Sense"

== See also ==
- Sense, a biological system used by an organism for sensation
- Animal echolocation, a biological active sonar used by several animal groups
- Five senses (disambiguation)
- Nociception, the sensory nervous system's process of encoding noxious stimuli
- Sense of balance, the perception of balance and spatial orientation
- Superpower (ability), a special or extraordinary ability far greater than what is considered normal
- Telepathy, the purported transmission of information from one person's mind to another's
- List of psychic abilities
