= Juan Conchillos Falco =

Spanish painter (1641–1711)

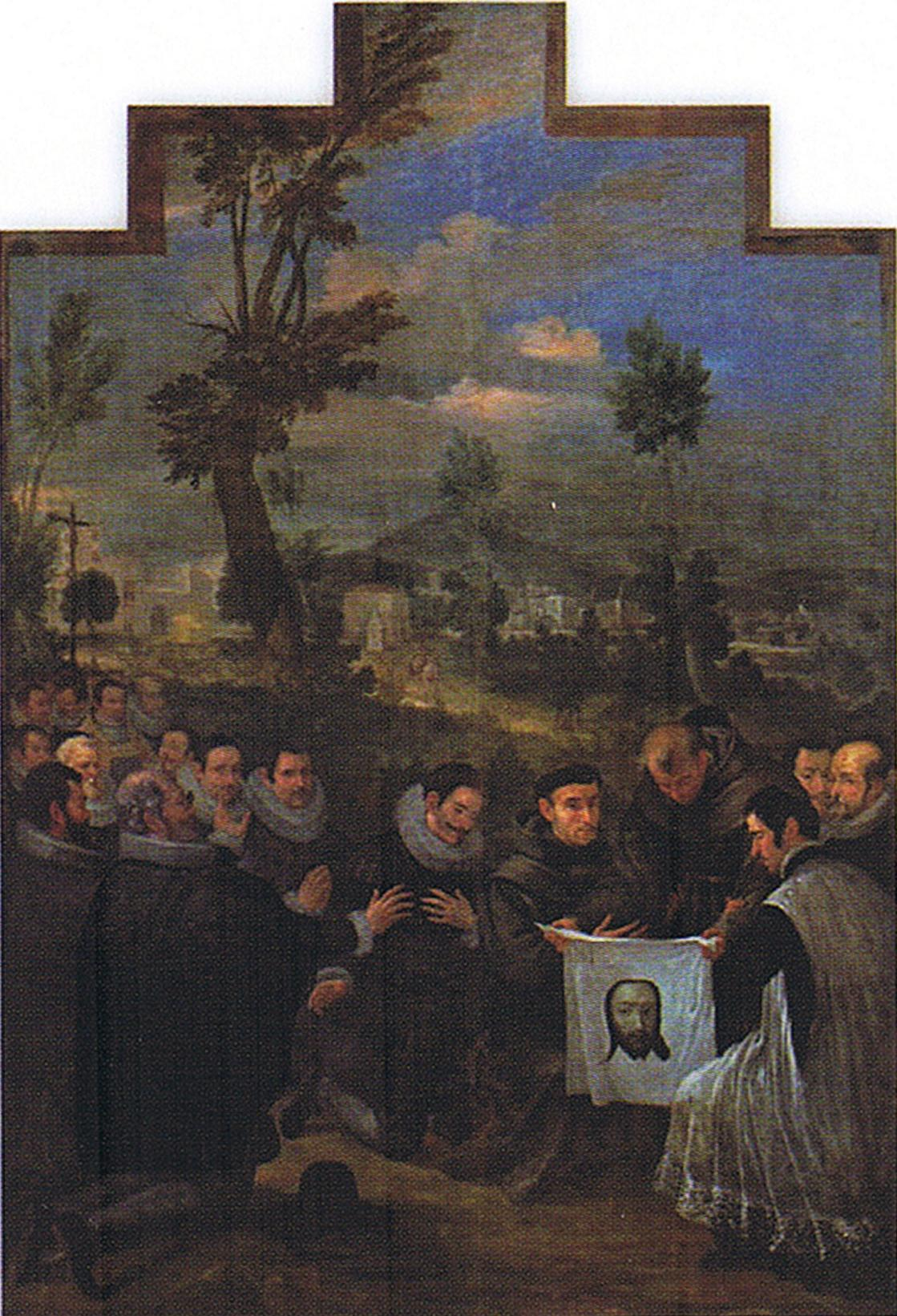
Miracle of the tear by Juan Conchillos Falco, Monastery Santa Faz, Alicante

Juan Conchillos Falco (1641 – 14 May 1711) was a Spanish painter in the Baroque style.

== Biography ==
He was born in Valencia. He came from an illustrious family and spent many years studying in the workshop of Esteban March, who was apparently rather eccentric. In 1670, he moved to Madrid, where he was reunited with José García Hidalgo, a former fellow student, who helped him find work; most of which is now lost. While there, he pursued additional studies and copied the Old Masters at the museums. When he returned to Valencia, he introduced what he had learned into the Valencian art milieu.

He painted several scenes from the life of the Christ of Beirut for the Church of the Savior, which were destroyed during the Spanish Civil War. An image of St. Bartholomew is preserved in Murcia, at a church dedicated to that saint. In Alicante, he produced icons and scenes related to the Holy Face of Jesus for the Monasterio de la Santa Faz. A few works are in private collections.

He is perhaps best known for his drawings; maintaining a private school at his home that emphasized the use of charcoal. he is said to have made one charcoal drawing every night, although he also worked in gouache. A large number of his drawings, meticulously dated, are in the collections of the Museo del Prado and the Biblioteca Nacional de España, among others. Some of his better known students include Vicente Bru, Evaristo Muñoz and his own son, Manuel Antonio.

An attack of palsy left him permanently crippled and he was forced to retire. Not long after, he became totally blind. He died in Valencia in 1711.
