= Vicente Salvador Gómez =

Spanish painter

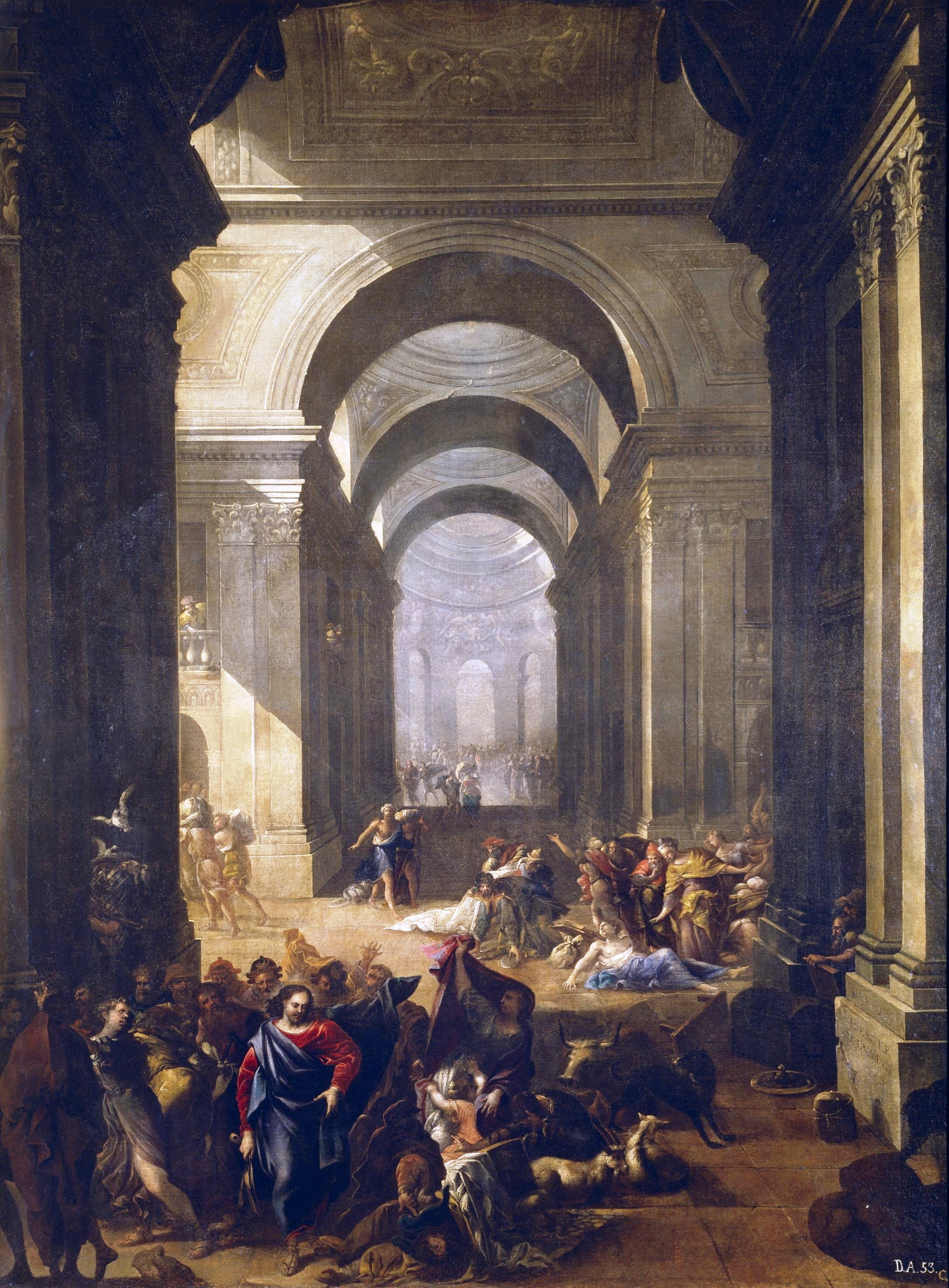
Purification of the Temple by Vicente Salvador Gómez, Museo del Prado, 1680

Vicente Salvador Gómez (c. 1637–1678) was a Spanish Baroque painter.

== Biography ==
Gómez was born in Valencia into a family of artists. He was the son of the painter Pedro Salvador, and he would start in the practice of painting with his brother Luciano, who would also become a painter of some renown imitating Flemish painting. In Valencia he starred as an "Academic Major" in the academy established in the convent of Santo Domingo.

He probably perfected his studies in the studio of Jerónimo Jacinto de Espinosa, whose influence is evident in his early works, and perhaps undertook a trip to Italy, a fact which could not be confirmed documentary. He was a painter as early as fourteen years old and painted some pictures of the life of St. Ignatius of Loyola for la Casa Profesa de Valencia.

In his voluminous preserved collection, the first works that can be dated with certainty is dedicated to San Vicente Ferrer in the chapel of the convent of Santo Domingo de Valencia ( 1665), paintings close to the work of Espinosa and not inferior. Very different are other works, considered later, in which the artist was interested in deep architectural perspectives, with a very dynamic treatment of the figures and a dramatic study of light, as can be found on the Purification of the Temple which now resides in the Museo del Prado.

His intellectual interests are reflected in his library, with works largely from the collection of Alonso Cano, and his dedication to the front of the Academy of the convent of Santo Domingo, where theoretical and practical lessons taught drawing by artists to members of the nobility and clergy, which left a very vivid description by José García Hidalgo. Gómez wrote Primer and Painting rules that are not even published, fragmentarily preserved in the Royal Palace of Madrid Royal Library, dated 1674 and signed by him with the title "of the Holy Office and censor of the paintings in his decency and worship."

== External links and references ==
- MARCO GARCIA, Victor (2006). The painter Salvador Gómez Vicente (Valencia, 1637-1678 .. Valencia: Institució Alfons the Magnanimous-Dep. Of Valencia. ISBN 84-7822-453-X.
- PEREZ SANCHEZ, Alfonso E. (1992). Baroque Painting in Spain 1600-1750 .. Madrid: Ediciones SA Chair. ISBN 84-376-0994-1.
- PEREZ SANCHEZ, Alfonso E. (1980). The Spanish drawing of the golden age. Madrid: Ministry of Culture. Legal Deposit M. 16.788.-1980.
- Scholarly articles in English about Vicente Salvador Gómez both in web and PDF @ the Spanish Old Masters Gallery
