= Jerónimo Jacinto de Espinosa =

Spanish Baroque painter (1600–1667)

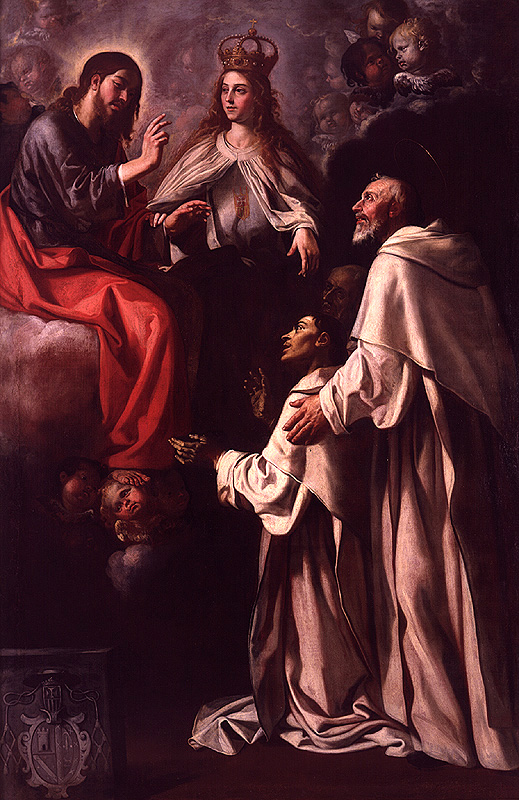
- Jerónimo Jacinto de Espinosa, Saint Peter Nolasco interceding, 1651-1652.
- Born: 18 July 1600; Cocentaina
- Died: 20 February 1667 (aged 66); Valencia
- Occupation: artist

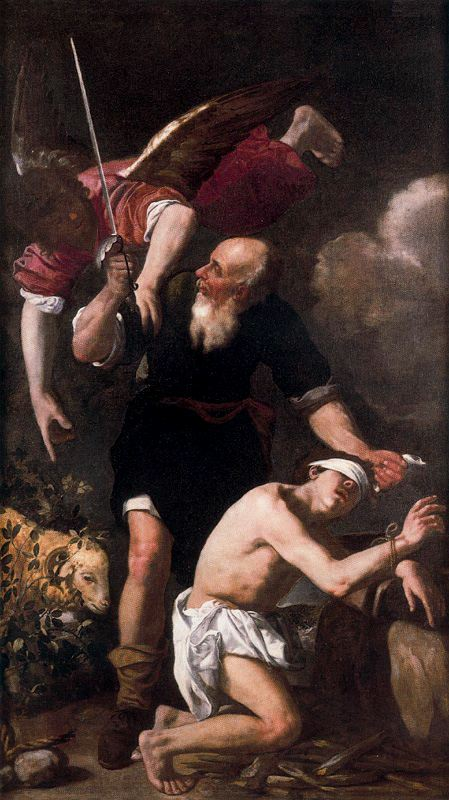
The Sacrifice of Isaac

Jerónimo Jacinto de Espinosa (18 July 1600 – 20 February 1667) was a Spanish Baroque painter. His father was the painter Jerónimo Rodriguez de Espinosa, who had relocated to that area and gotten married there in 1596. He was the third child, of six. His family returned to Valencia in 1612.

== Life and work ==
He began his artistic training in his father's workshop, where he produced a precocious painting of John the Baptist, showing the influence of Francesc Ribalta. At the age of seventeen he enrolled in the newly created Colegio de Pintores, In 1622, he married Jerònima de Castro, the daughter of a local merchant. The following year, he began a long series of commissions; many of them portraits of the nobility.

In his later years, he was heavily influenced by the works of Pedro Orrente, especially in his religious compositions. Ribalta's influence continued to be apparent, however.

Many of his most notable works were depictions of the Virgin and Child, including an "Our Lady of the Rosary" at the Basilica of Our Virgin of the Homeless and the "Virgin and Child on a Throne with Angels", now in the Museo del Prado. Portraits of individual saints were another popular subject. All of his works are signed and dated, making it easy to trace his creative development.

Toward the end of his career, he received a series of commissions from the Order of the Blessed Virgin Mary of Mercy. In 1665, he working on the main altar at the church of the capuchins in Massamagrell; parts of which are now conserved at the Museu de Belles Arts de València.

He was interred at the Convent of Santo Domingo. Several works he had left unfinished were completed by his son, Jerónimo. Among the artists he influenced were Vicente Salvador Gómez, Pablo Pontons, Mateo Gilarte, and Gaspar de la Huerta.

== Selected works ==
- Retrato del padre Jerónimo Mos (Portrait of Father Jerónimo Mos) (205 x 112 cm.), Museo de Bellas Artes de Valencia.
- Visión de San Ignacio (Vision of St. Ignatius), (1621), 425 x 298 cm, Museo de Bellas Artes de Valencia.
- Retrato de don Felipe Vives de Cañamás y Mompalau, (1634), 207 x 130, Kingston Lacy, colección Bankes
- Muerte de San Luis Beltrán (Death of San Luis Beltrán) (1653), 384 x 227 cm., Museo de Bellas Artes de Valencia.
- Milagros de San Luis Beltrán (1655), Museo de Bellas Artes de Valencia (315 x 221 cm.)
- Última Cena (Last Supper) (1657), 315 x 221 cm, Santa María church, Morella
- Virgen con el Niño
- Aparición de la Virgen al venerable Jerónimo Calmell (Apparition of the Virgin by the Venerable Jerónimo Calmell) (1660), 168 x 136 cm, private collection.
- Aparición de la Virgen a San Pedro Nolasco (Apparition of the Virgin at San Pedro Nolasco) (315 x 270 cm.), firmado y fechado en 1661, Museo de Bellas Artes de Valencia
- Aparición de San Pedro y San Pablo a Constantino (Apparition of Saints Peter and Paul at Constantine) (245 x 314 cm.), Museo de Bellas Artes de Valencia.
- Golden Legend of Jacobus de Voragine
- Milagroso hallazgo de la Virgen del Puig (1660), 225 x 172 cm., Museo de Bellas Artes de Valencia
- Retrato del Padre Fray José Sanchís, Mercedario (Portrait of Padre Fray José Sanchís), (around 1659 and 1662), 203 x 101, University of Valencia
- Inmaculada (Immaculate) (1660), University of Valencia
- La Inmaculada con los jurados de la ciudad, (1662), 360 x 350 cm, Lonja de Valencia, The Golden Hall
- Coronación de la Virgen (Coronation of the Virgin), (108 x 96 cm.), Ayuntamiento de Valencia, Museo de la Ciudad (City Museum).
- Comunión de la Magdalena, (1665), 315 x 226 cm., Museo de Bellas Artes de Valencia.
- Martirio de San Leodicio y Santa Gliseria (Martyr of Saints Leodicius and Glyceria) (1667), 270 x 192 cm., Colegio del Corpus Christi de Valencia
