= Allegory of Sight =

Painting by Jan Brueghel the Younger

- Venus and Cupid in a Picture Gallery
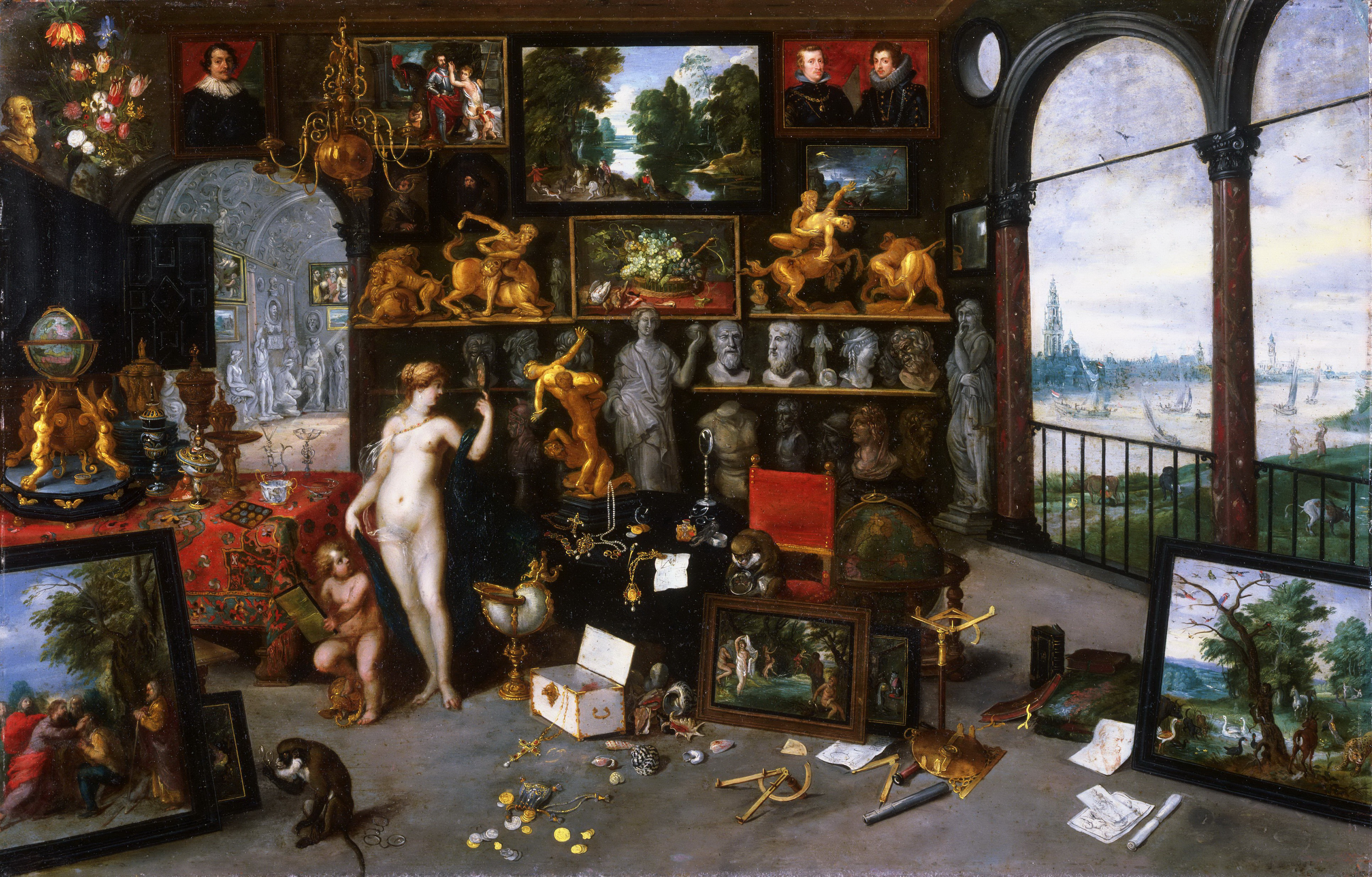
- Artist: Jan Brueghel the Younger
- Year: c. 1660
- Medium: Oil on copper
- Dimensions: 58.1 cm × 89.7 cm (22.9 in × 35.3 in)
- Location: Philadelphia Museum of Art, Philadelphia

Allegory of Sight is an oil painting by Jan Brueghel the Younger. The painting showcases varied objects associated with sight, the arts, and navigation. The painting was heavily influenced by The Five Senses, a series of allegorical paintings done by the younger Brueghel's father, Jan Brueghel the Elder.

== Description ==
Allegory of Sight depicts a scene in which the Greco-Roman goddess Venus and her son Cupid examine an impressive collection of valuables. Venus is seen examining her reflection in a mirror, while Cupid can be seen holding a ledger and stepping over a golden vessel. Other symbols of wealth dot the image; a spilled coin-purse and a monkey can be seen in the bottom of the painting, along with various pieces of navigational equipment. Busts, gilded figures, flowers, globes, exotic shells, and paintings also fill the room, bearing testament to the wealth and intellectual pursuits of the collection's owner.
