= Jerónimo Rodriguez de Espinosa =

Spanish painter

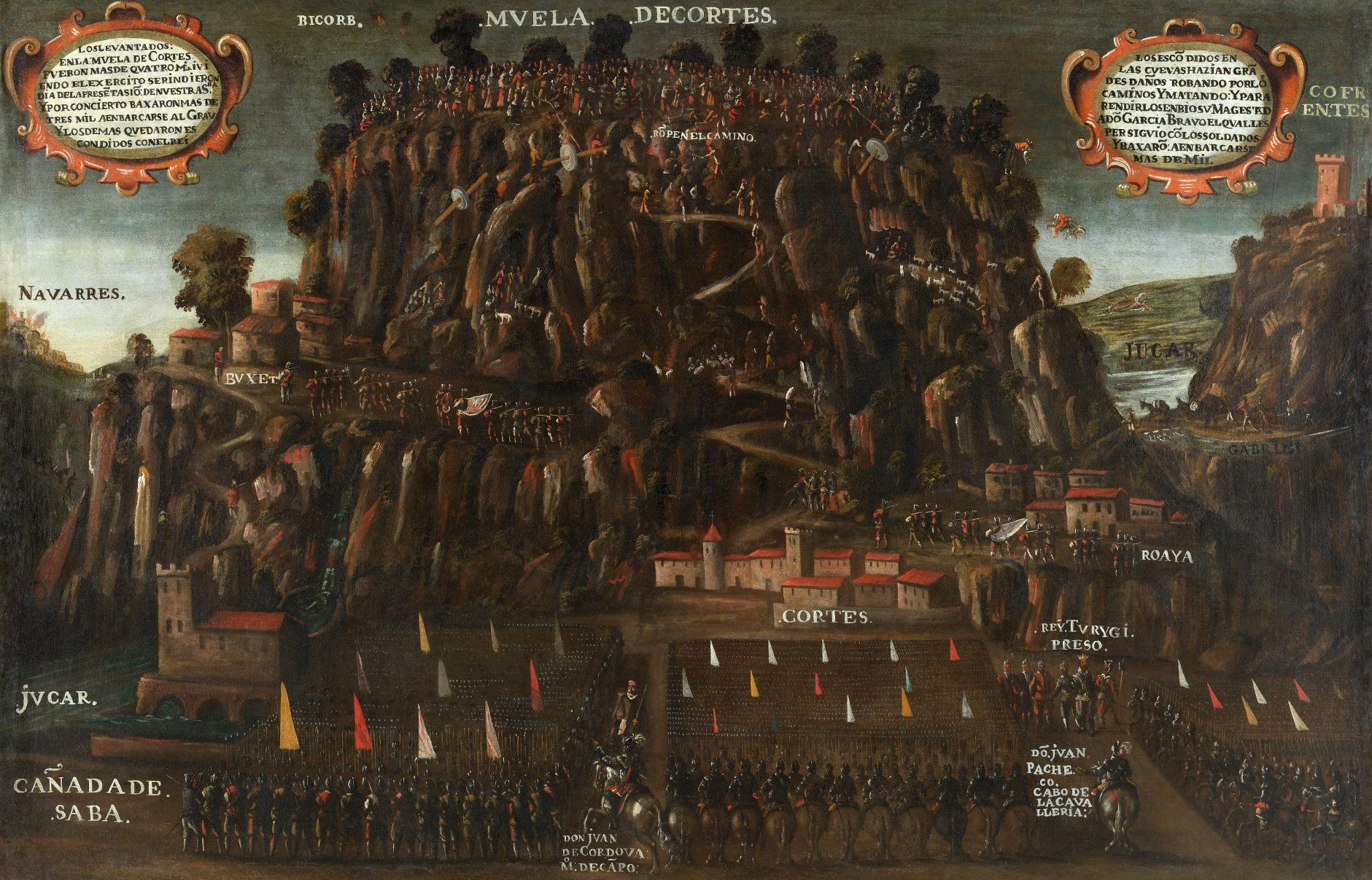
Moorish Armed Resistance against Expulsion in Muela de Cortes attributed to Jerónimo Rodríguez de Espinosa, 1613

Jerónimo Rodríguez de Espinosa (1562 in Valladolid–c. 1630 in Valencia) was a Spanish painter of the Renaissance period active in the region of Valencia.

He was born at Valladolid, where he received his initial training, and as an adult moved to the Valencian town of Cocentaina. There he married, in 1596, Aldonza Lied, by whom he fathered Jerónimo Jacinto de Espinosa, a painter of great reputation in the reign of Philip IV.

For the church of the town Espinosa painted, in 1600, pictures of St. Lorenzo and St. Hipdlito; and the year following, St. Sebastian and St. Roque, of which he made an offering to the same edifice. In 1604-7 he executed, in conjunction with a certain Jayme Terol, a scholar of Fray Nicolas Borras, the pictures for the high altar of St. John Baptist's Church in the town of Muro. He died in Valencia.

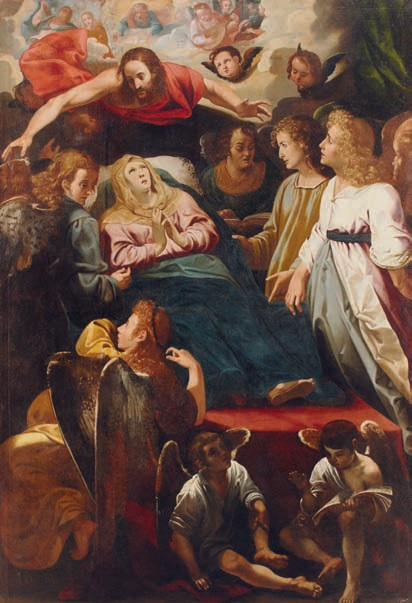
Tránsito de la Virgen

== Bibliography ==
- Benito Domenech, Fernando, Jerónimo Jacinto de Espinosa en sus comienzos como pintor, Ars Longa. Cuadernos de Arte, 1993, nº 4, pp. 59–63.
- Catalá Gorgues, Miguel Ángel, El tema iconográfico de la muerte de la Virgen y su proyección tardía en dos interesantes pinturas del Museo de Bellas Artes de Valencia, Archivo de Arte Valenciano (Valencian Art Archive), 2009, vol. XC, p. 91-102.
- Ceán Bermúdez, Juan Agustín (1800). Diccionario histórico de los más ilustres profesores de la Bellas Artes en España. Madrid.
- Pérez Sánchez, Alfonso E. (2000). Jerónimo Jacinto de Espinosa (1600-1667) Valencia: Museo de Bellas Artes, ISBN 84-482-2563-5.
