= Salmeron (surname) =

Salmeron or Salmerón is a surname, and may refer to:

- Alfonso Salmerón (1515–1585), Jesuit Bible scholar
- Cristobal Garcia Salmeron (1603–1666), Spanish painter
- Francisco Salmerón (1608–1632)
- Juan de Salmerón, 16th-century Spanish colonial official
- Luis Salmerón, Argentine football player
- Nicolás Salmerón y Alonso (1838–1908), Spanish statesman
- Roberto Salmeron, Brazilian scientist

== See also ==
- Salmerón, province of Guadalajara, Spain
