= The Five Senses (Ribera) =

Painting series by Jusepe de Ribera

Allegories of the Five Senses is a series of early-17th-century paintings by the Spanish artist Jusepe de Ribera. One of the series (Hearing) has been lost and is known only through copies.

According to the art historian Giulio Mancini, a contemporary of the artist, their commissioner was Spanish but they were probably produced during Ribera's stay in Rome. Alfonso Pérez Sánchez dates their production to between 1611 and 1615.

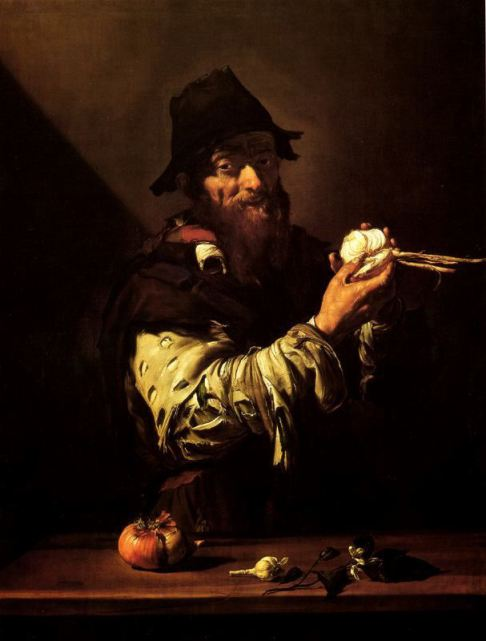
Smell
(115 cm x 88 cm), private collection

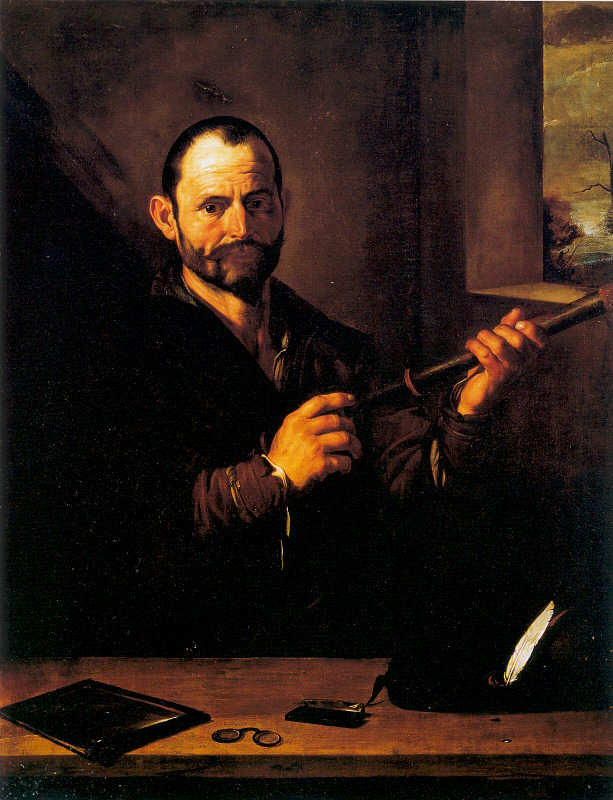
Sight
(114 x 89 cm) Franz Mayer Museum, Mexico.

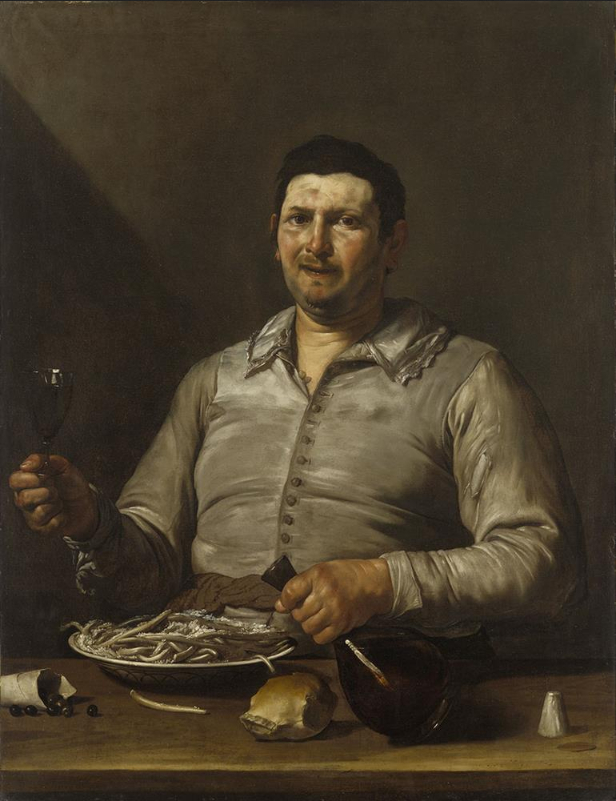
Taste
(113.8 cm x 88.3 cm), Wadsworth Atheneum, Hartford, Connecticut.

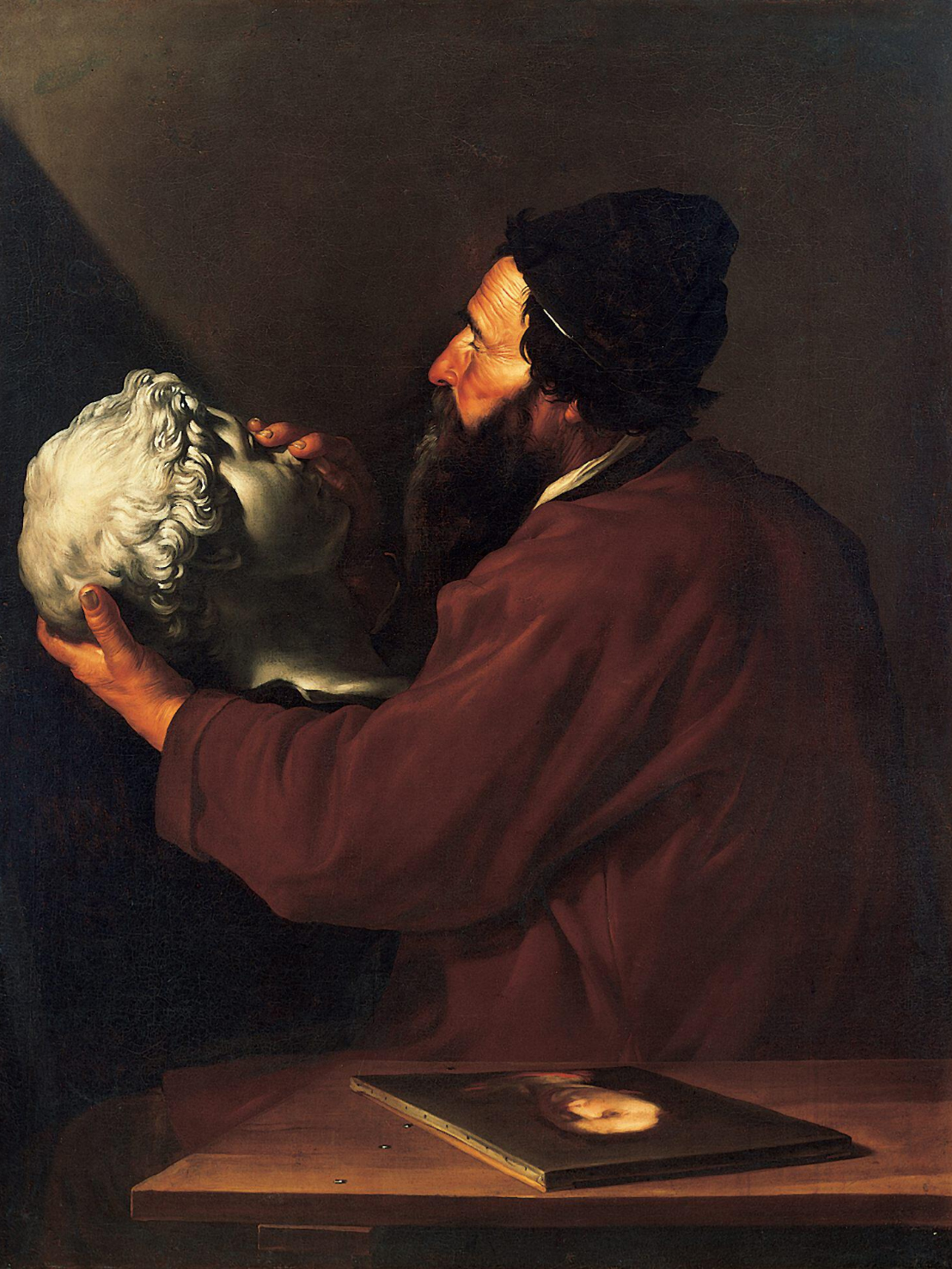
Touch
(116 cm x 88.3 cm), Norton Simon Museum, Pasadena.

== Bibliography ==
- Pérez Sánchez, Alfonso E.; Spinosa, Nicola (1992). Jusepe de Ribera, 1591-1652. New York: Metropolitan Museum of Art Distributed by Harry N. Abrams. ISBN 0-87099-647-9. OCLC 26095483.
