= Pablo Pontons =

Spanish painter

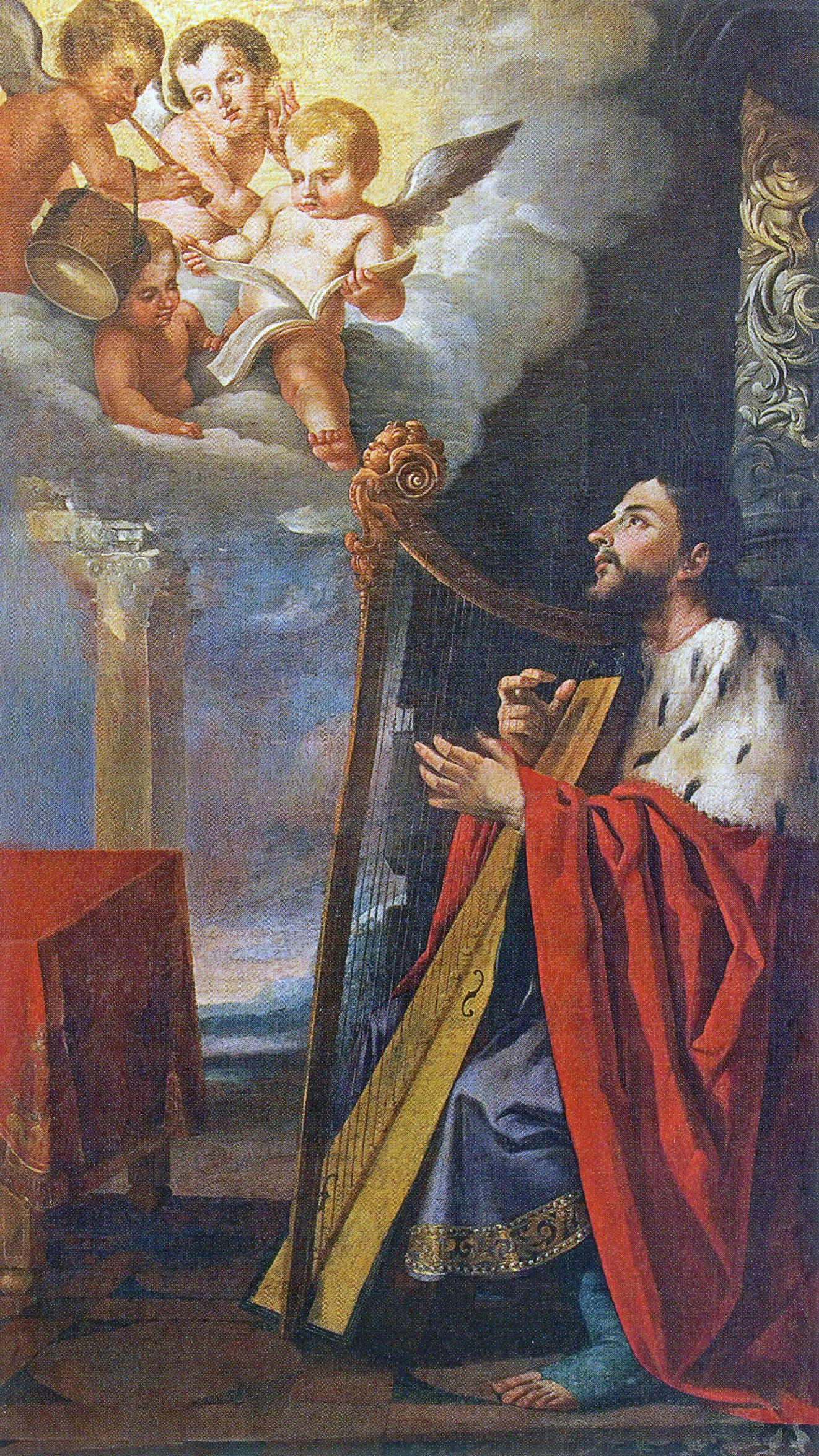
David Penitent

Pablo Pontons (1630 – 1691) was a Spanish Baroque painter, believed to have been a student of Pedro de Orrente, whose style he promoted.

== Biography ==
He was born in Valencia. His mother was from Murcia and was apparently related to Orrente. Although he was Pontons's primary influence, his earliest work also shows elements of composition and coloring reminiscent of Jerónimo Jacinto de Espinosa. Orrente's influence is easiest to see in works such as the main altar of the Iglesia de Santa María in Morella, with its slightly anachronistic depiction of King James I celebrating the first mass after final conquest of Morella, and a scene showing Moses delivering the tablets of the law to the Israeli people, which is now at the Museo de Bellas Artes de Murcia.

Antonio Ponz, in volume four of his Viage de España, from 1774, gives praise to paintings representing the lives of Saints Peter Nolasco and Peter Pascual, at the convent of the Mercedarios Calzados, but these appear to be lost. Another work for the same order, depicting Saint Raymond Nonnatus was at their convent in El Puig, but was later acquired by the Museo de Bellas Artes de Valencia. This work shows the influence of Espinosa, more than Orrente.

Pontons died in Valencia in 1691.
