= Cristóbal García Salmerón =

Spanish painter (c.1603–c.1666)

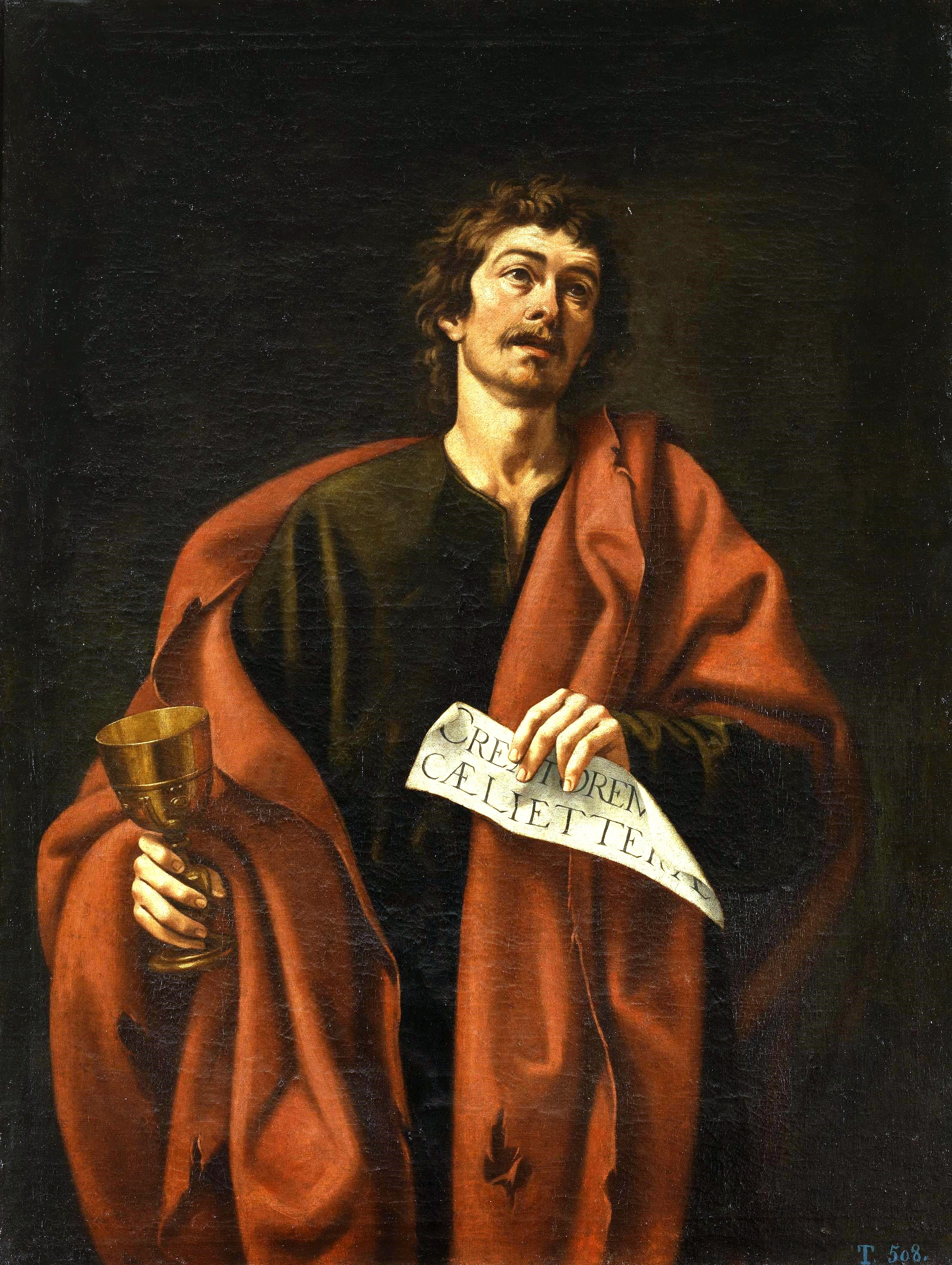
Saint John the Evangelist (142 x 107cm.) Museo del Prado.

Cristóbal García Salmerón (c.1603 – c.1666) was a Spanish painter of the Baroque period.

== Life and works ==
There is very little biographical data available. Salmerón was born in Cuenca. It is generally assumed that he was a student of Pedro Orrente, either in Cuenca or Toledo, but no documentary evidence supports it. Most likely it was Toledo, as his work also shows the influence of Luis Tristán and Juan Bautista Maíno. His first signed work, "San Julián, obispo de Cuenca", created for Málaga Cathedral in 1673, owes some obvious debt to Orrente as well as Vicente Carducho.

In Cuenca Cathedral there is a signed work on the altar, depicting Saint John the Baptist. In 1642, when King Philip IV passed through Cuenca, he painted a bullfight that had been held for the occasion. That work received great praise from the art historian Antonio Palomino, when he saw it at the Royal Alcázar of Madrid.

In 1648, he received a commission to create a series of portraits of apostles and prophets for the nave of Cuenca Cathedral. These later formed the background for engravings of the cathedral by Hans Vredeman de Vries. He is also credited with a series of half-length apostles carrying signs with verses from the Creeds, of which many copies were made. Some are now in the Museo del Prado.

At an unknown date, he moved to Madrid, which is attested by the presence of several works in his style; notably at the Convento del Carmen Calzado.

== Sources ==
- Angulo Íñiguez, Diego; Pérez Sánchez, Alfonso E. (1972). Pintura toledana de la primera mitad del siglo XVII. Madrid, Instituto Diego Velázquez, CSIC. ISBN 84-00-03829-0.
- Palomino, Antonio (1988). El museo pictórico y escala óptica III. El parnaso español pintoresco laureado. Madrid : Aguilar S.A. de Ediciones. ISBN 84-03-88005-7.
- Pérez Sánchez, Alfonso E. (1992). Pintura barroca en España 1600-1750. Madrid : Ediciones Cátedra. ISBN 84-376-0994-1.
