= Mosen Vicente Bru =

Spanish painter (1682–1703)

Mosen Vicente Bru (1682–1703) was a Spanish painter. He was born at Valencia. He was the pupil of Juan Conchillos. He painted for the churches in his native city, including a St. Francisco de Paula, a Baptism of Christ by St. John, and an All the Saints for the church of San Juan del Mercado.
