= Isidoro Bosarte =

Spanish historian and writer

Isidoro Bosarte (1747–1807) was a Spanish historian and writer of Spanish arts.
