= Pedro Orrente =

Spanish painter (1580–1625)

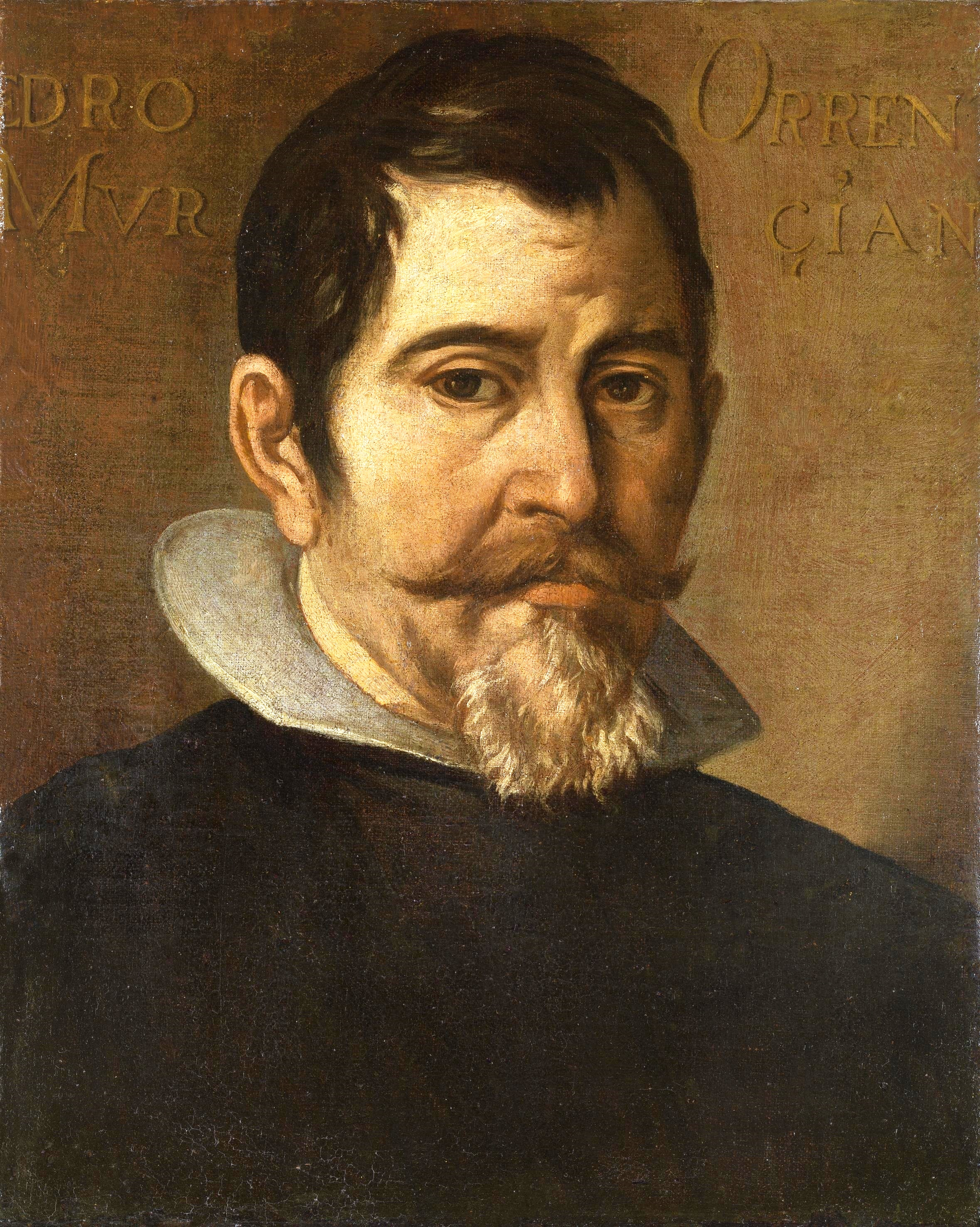
Self-portrait (1620s)

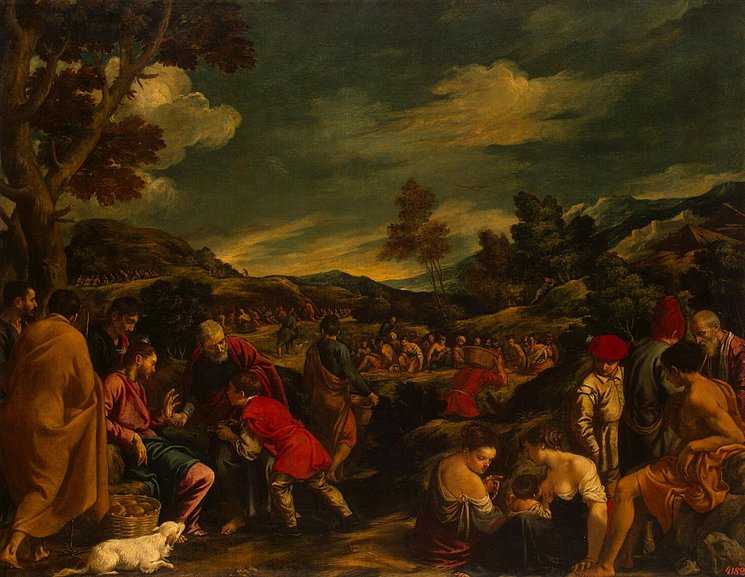
Feeding the multitude

Pedro de Orrente (April 1580 – 19 January 1645) was a Spanish painter of the early Baroque period. He became one of the first artists in that part of Spain to paint in a Naturalistic style.

== Biography ==
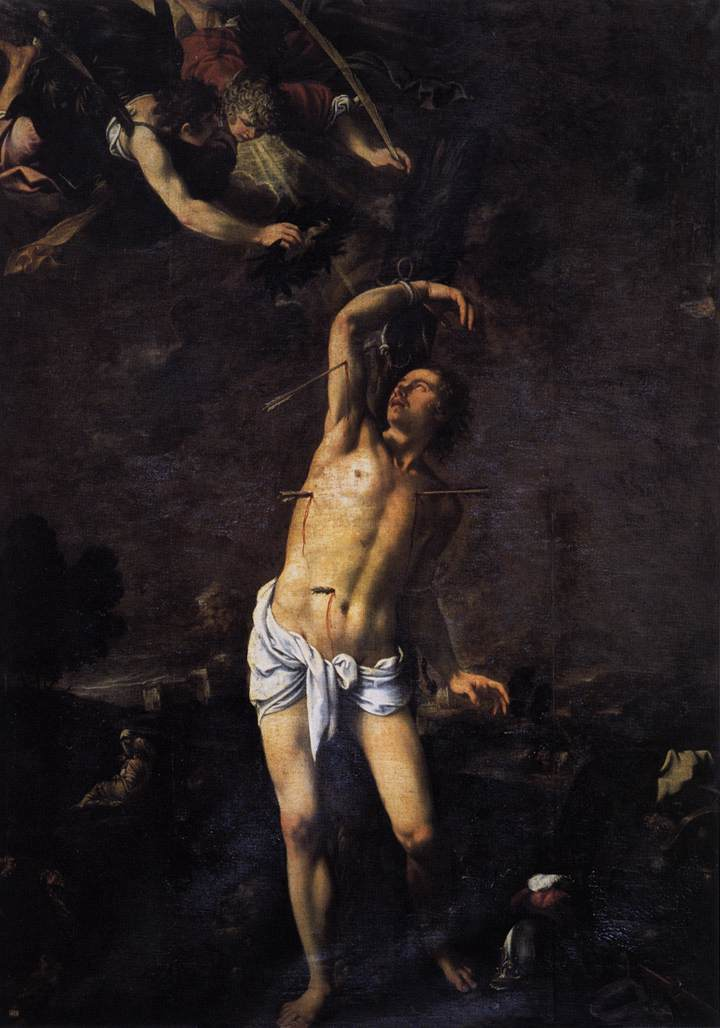
The Martyrdom of Saint Sebastian

He was born in April 1580 in Murcia. His father, Jaime de Horrente, was a merchant from Marseille who had settled in Murcia in 1573. There is some documentary evidence that he was the friend of an otherwise unknown painter named Juan de Arizmendi, who probably gave Pedro his first lessons. By 1600, Pedro was in Toledo, where he was hired to create an altarpiece in the village of Guadarrama. It has not been preserved.

He attracted little more attention until 1604, when a certain Jerónimo de Castro wrote a promise to pay Pedro's father for work that Pedro had recently done. After that time, he may have been in Italy until 1607, when he was back in Murcia arranging for the services of a maid. Letters from a later period indicate that he and Angelo Nardi may have become friends while he was there. He was married in Murcia in 1612.

By 1616, he was in Valencia, where he painted the monumental "Martyrdom of San Sebastián" at the cathedral. A year later, he was doing similar works at Toledo Cathedral. In the midst of these moves, he stopped in Cuenca and may have taken on Cristóbal García Salmerón as a student.

In 1624, he requested admission to the Santo Oficio (an agency of the Inquisition), but in 1626 he was back in Toledo, where Alejandro de Loarte appointed him an executor and he took a student named Juan de Sevilla, son of the sculptor Juan de Sevilla Villaquirán. This was his only officially documented student. While there, he also befriended Jorge Manuel Theotocópuli, the son of El Greco, and became godfather for two of his children. Works he produced during that period include decorations at the Franciscan convent in Yeste and at the Buen Retiro Palace. In 1630, he charged a "very considerable amount" for a "Birth of Christ" at the Chapel of Los Reyes Nuevos.

He was apparently in Toledo until 1632. A letter from the Santo Oficio, related to his application for membership, indicates that he and his wife were living in Espinardo in 1633. By 1638, he had bought two houses in Murcia. Only one year later, he had moved away again, leaving an altarpiece unfinished. The next available piece of documentary evidence is a will that he made in Valencia in 1645, when he was widowed and childless and very comfortable, financially. He died only two days later, on 19 January 1645.

Several artists were profoundly influenced by his style, including Esteban March, Pablo Pontons and Mateo Gilarte.

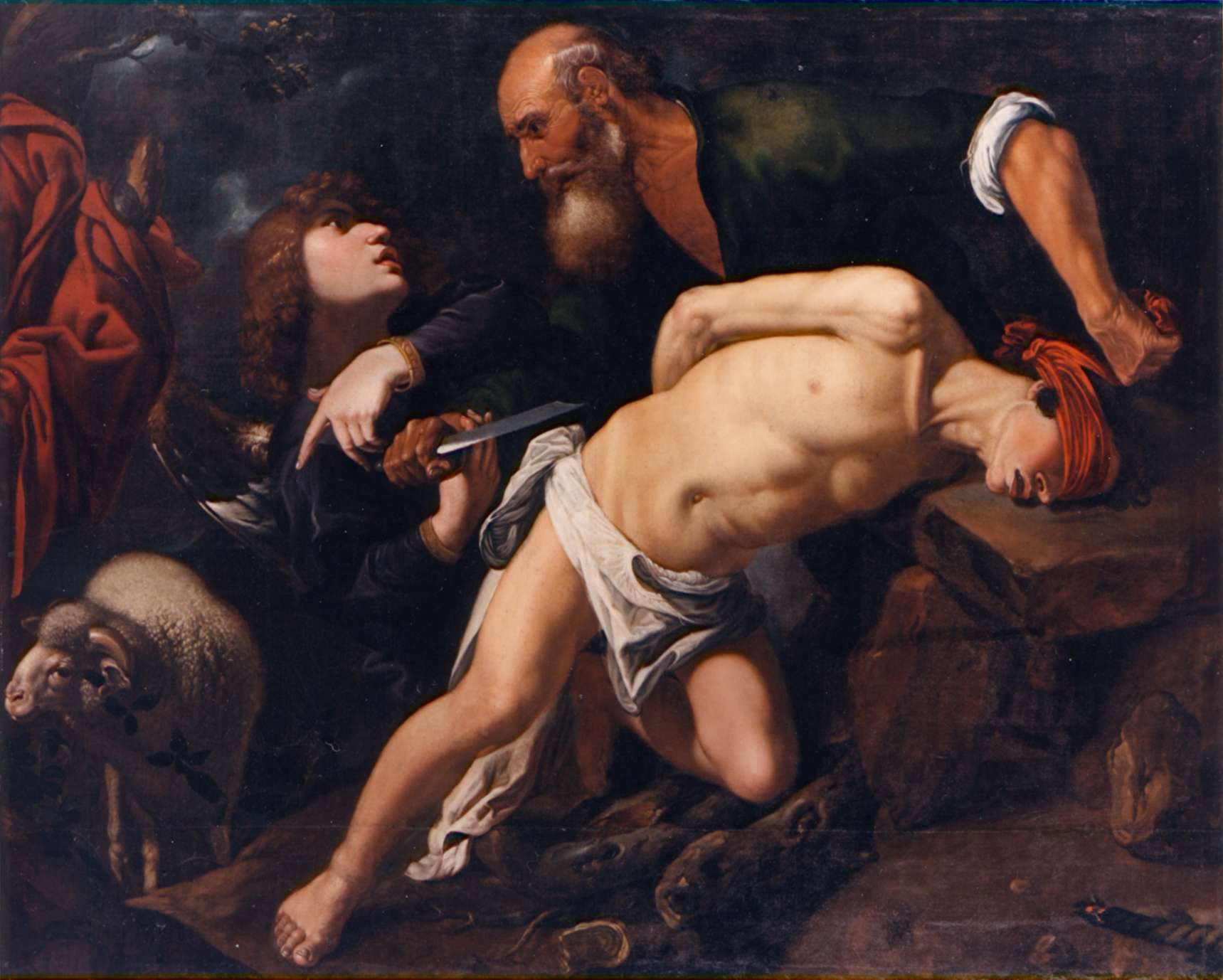
The Sacrifice of Isaac

== Selected works ==
- La vuelta al aprisco, oil on panel (74x89 cm), Museo del Prado, Madrid
- Martyrdom of Saint James the Lesser, oil on panel (204x158 cm), Museo de Bellas Artes, Valencia
- Saint John the Evangelist in Patmos, oil on panel (99x131 cm), Museo del Prado
- Saint John the Baptist in the Desert, oil on panel (142x107 cm), Museo de Santa Cruz, Toledo
- Self-Portrait, oil on panel (45 x 36 cm), private collection, Madrid, formerly in the collection of Louis-Philippe of Orleans
- Labán da alcance a Jacob, Museo del Prado, Madrid
    - Ecce Homo, Walters Art Museum, Baltimore
