= Mateo Gilarte =

Spanish painter (c.1629–1675)

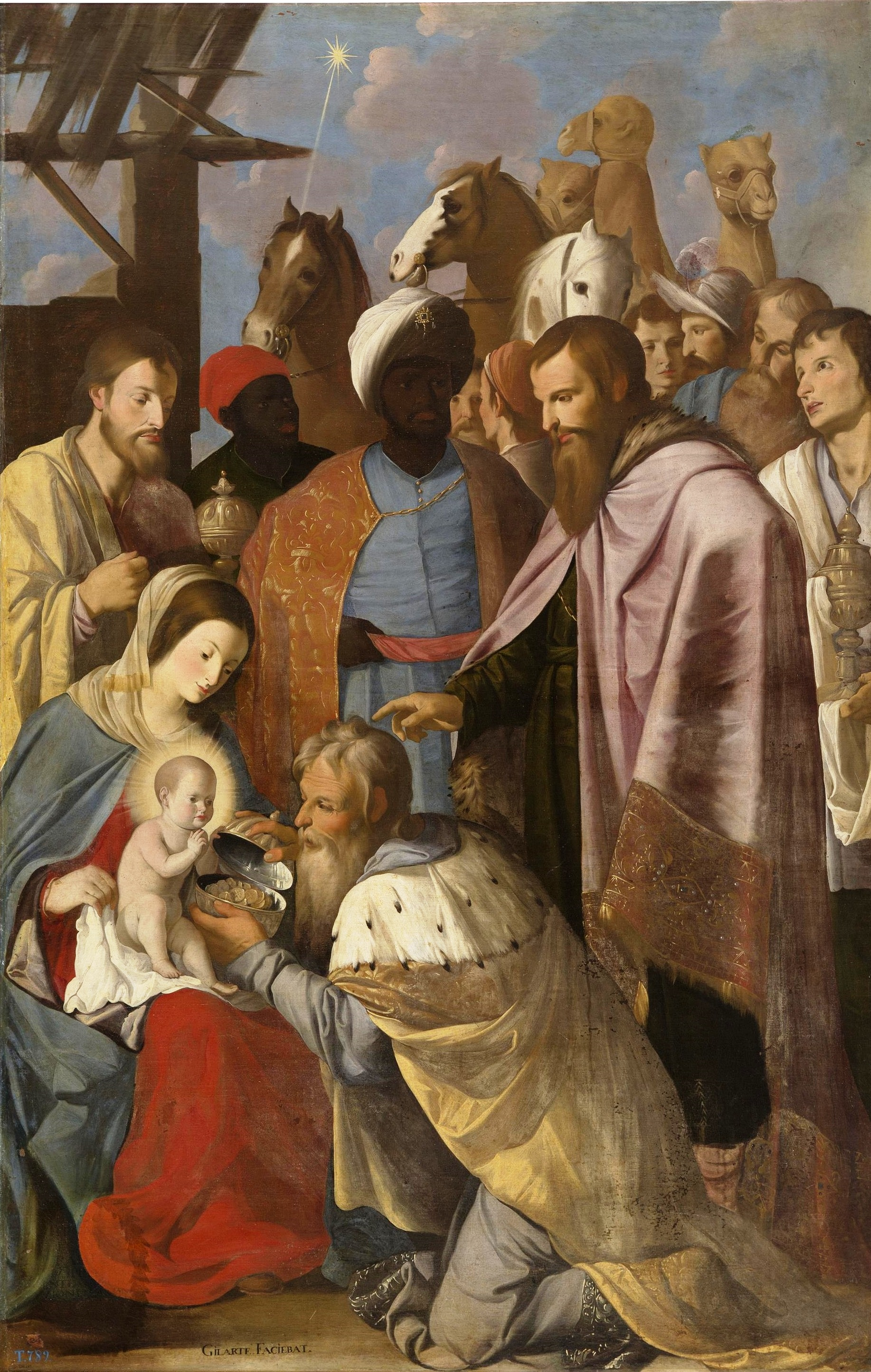
Adoration of the Magi

Mateo Gilarte (c. 1629, Orihuela - 1675, Murcia) was a Spanish Baroque painter.

== Life and work ==
His father, Francisco, was a gunpowder manufacturer. While still an infant, his family moved to Murcia. He trained as a painter in Valencia, most likely in the workshop of Jerónimo Jacinto de Espinosa, although his youthful work also shows the influence of Pedro de Orrente. By 1651, he had resettled in Murcia, where he collaborated with his brother Francisco, a cathedral painter, on producing a series of paintings devoted to the life of the Virgin. In 1658, he was given the title of "Master of the Royal Gunpowder Factories", by royal concession. It is not known if he had actually followed his father's trade in addition to painting, so this may have been an honorary title.

Between 1663 and 1667, again collaborating with his brother, he created several oil paintings and frescoes in the chapel of the Brotherhood of the Rosary at the Convent of Santo Domingo. According to the chronicler Antonio Palomino, he received some sort of tribute for his depiction of the Battle of Lepanto and became friends with the famous "Captain of Horses", Juan de Toledo, during its execution. More recent research suggests that Toledo actually spent his last years in Madrid.

In his will, he declared himself to be poor and was buried in the chapel of the Brotherhood of the Rosary, of which he had become a member. Palomino wrote that he left a daughter, Magdalena, who also became an artist, although it appears she was actually Francisco's daughter.

== Sources ==
- Antonio Palomino, El museo pictórico y escala óptica III. El parnaso español pintoresco laureado, Aguilar S.A. de Ediciones, 1988 ISBN 84-03-88005-7
- José Carlos Agüera Ros, Un ciclo pictórico del 600 murciano. La Capilla del Rosario, Academia Alfonso X, 1982
- José Carlos Agüera Ros, Pintura y sociedad en el siglo XVII. Murcia, un centro del Barroco español, Real Academia Alfonso X, 1984 ISBN 84-87408-83-4
