= The Five Senses (pair of paintings) =

Painting series by Jan Brueghel the Elder

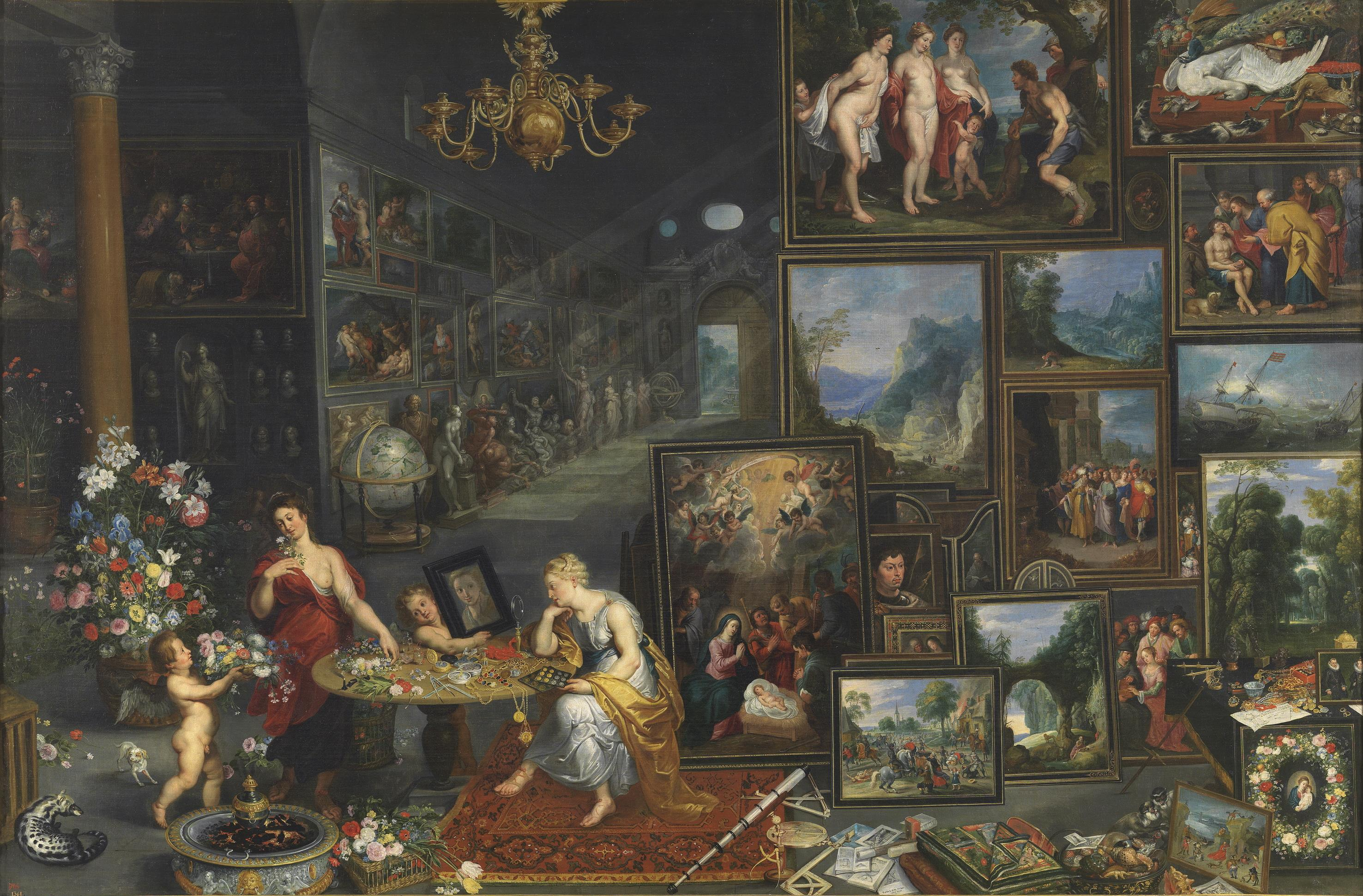
The Senses of Sight and Smell, 1618; copy c. 1620

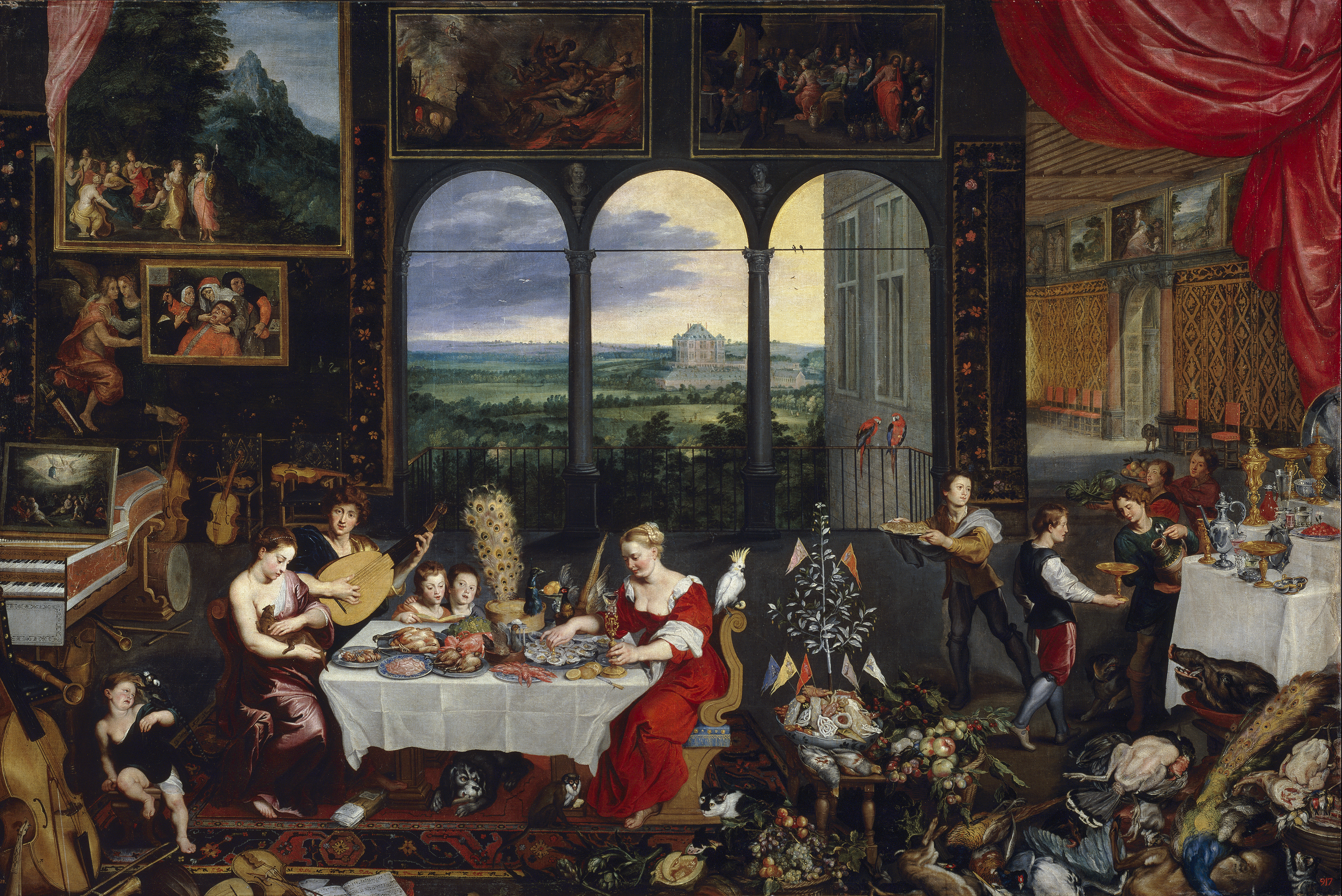
The Senses of Hearing, Touch and Taste, 1618; copy c. 1620

The Five Senses are a pair of oil paintings made by Jan Brueghel the Elder and others in 1617-1618, at the same time as he was working with Peter Paul Rubens on a series of five paintings on the same topic. The originals were lost in a fire in 1731; faithful copies dated to c. 1620 were preserved and are in the Prado Museum in Madrid.

== Background ==
Brueghel, like Rubens, was at this time working in Antwerp at the court of Albert VII, Archduke of Austria, and his wife Isabella, governors of the Spanish Netherlands. Allegorical paintings representing the five senses as female nudes had become fashionable in the previous century, but Brueghel introduced the illustration of the theme by means of assemblages of works of art, musical instruments, scientific instruments and military equipment, accompanied by flowers, game and fish, which was widely adopted by Flemish artists.

== History ==
The two paintings were commissioned by the City of Antwerp to be presented to the archducal couple, and were executed by "twelve of the best masters of [the] city". They were paid for in October 1618. In 1619 they were in the audience chamber at Tervuren castle. In 1731 they were destroyed in the fire at Coudenberg Palace. The surviving pair are close copies by Brueghel, Gerard Seghers, Frans Francken the Younger and Joost de Momper; they were in Spain by 1633, where they were housed in various royal palaces before becoming part of the foundation collection of the Prado in 1819.

== Description ==
The pair of paintings are unique in including copies of their own works by a group of masters of the Antwerp school. In Sight and Smell, the paintings in the background include The Healing of the Blind, representing spiritual sight, in contrast with physical sight, represented by a magnifying glass. A telescope in the foreground and a hallway in the rear, lined with art works, leading to an open door into nature and lit from above by shafts of sunlight, also refer to aspects of this sense. The female figure epitomising sight is looking at her reflection in a mirror which is held up for her by a putto, while the other female figure, representing smell, receives a bouquet of flowers from another putto. The dog represents an acute sense of smell, and the civet, stenches.

In Taste, Hearing and Touch, the central scene is a meal; a lutenist is playing and children singing, epitomising hearing, while one young woman strokes a mink in her arms, representing touch, and another is about to eat oysters, representing taste. Details such as the clavichord and other musical instruments on the left relate to hearing, and a monkey is pulling the hair of a Cupid, a form of touch. The room and the hall visible in the right rear display pictures which are also related to the three senses: The Annunciation and Minerva's Visit to Parnassus (hearing), The Dentist (touch), and The Punishment of Rich Epulon and The Wedding at Cana (taste).

In The Senses of Hearing, Touch and Taste there is a Sulphur-crested cockatoo, which is native to Australia, near the woman in a red dress. Historians have wondered how the cockatoo Brueghel depicted could have arrived in the Netherlands by this time considering the painting predates the earliest European images of wildlife native to Australia by 80 years. One theory is that Willem Janszoon returned from his first voyage to Australia with the bird to the Netherlands via Indonesia in 1611. The same cockatoo appears in an earlier canvas, Hearing, by Brueghel and Peter Paul Rubens as well.
