= The Sixth Sense (soundtrack) =

The Sixth Sense (Original Motion Picture Score)

Film score by James Newton Howard
- Released: August 24, 1999
- Studios: Newman Scoring Stage, 20th Century Fox Studios, Los Angeles; JNH Studios, Santa Monica, California; A&M Studios, Los Angeles
- Genre: Film score
- Length: 30:15
- Label: Varèse Sarabande
- Producers: James Newton Howard; J. T. Hill

James Newton Howard chronology
Stir of Echoes (1999)	The Sixth Sense (1999)	Mumford (1999)

The Sixth Sense (Original Motion Picture Score) is the film score composed by James Newton Howard to the 1999 film The Sixth Sense written and directed by M. Night Shyamalan. The album was released under the Varèse Sarabande label on August 24, 1999.

== Development ==
James Newton Howard composed the film score in his first collaboration with Shyamalan. Howard recalled that Shyamalan was working with another composer, but the producers needed to replace him for some reason. The producer Kathleen Kennedy recommended Howard's name, as the composer had worked in some of the productions and wanted him to see the film. He considered it a "huge game-change" moment, creatively on working with Shyamalan, whom he met during the post-production. Howard was "jaw dropped" on watching the climax which was tempted with classical music and agreed to be a part of the film. It was written and recorded within six weeks.

== Reception ==
Jonathan Broxton of Movie Music UK wrote "The Sixth Sense represents a masterful exercise in musical tension building and musical tension release and, although it lacks a memorable theme, nevertheless serves to provide an aural reminder of a great film."

Christian Clemmensen of Filmtracks wrote "the music for The Sixth Sense is easy to respect, but without the thematic splendor or instrumental creativity that Howard would provide for subsequent Shyamalan films, it stands as more of a functional work rather than an inspiring standalone piece." Stephen Holden of The New York Times wrote "it is the movie's treacly soundtrack by James Newton Howard, the Hollywood maestro du jour for smearing on goo whenever it's time to clench back tears." Heather Phares of AllMusic wrote "James Newton Howard's orchestral score for The Sixth Sense manages to capture the film's eerie, supernatural feel as well as its emotional impact, providing an equal amount of bone-chilling and tear-jerking musical moments." James Barry of Soundtrack.net wrote "In brief, this is an album which perfectly captures the mood of a film whose success was almost entirely due to it's [sic] mood. James Newton Howard proves himself once again a master of his craft."

== Track listing ==
No.	Title	Length
1.	"Run to the Church"	1:21
2.	"De Profundis"	2:23
3.	"Mind Reading"	2:45
4.	"Photographs"	0:55
5.	"Suicide Ghost"	1:34
6.	"Malcolm's Story / Cole's Secret"	4:01
7.	"Hanging Ghosts"	2:31
8.	"Tape of Vincent"	3:30
9.	"Help the Ghosts / Kyra's Ghost"	4:29
10.	"Kyra's Tape"	2:02
11.	"Malcolm Is Dead"	4:44
Total length:		30:15

== Personnel ==
Credits adapted from liner notes:

- Music composer – James Newton Howard
- Music producer – James Newton Howard, J.T. Hill
- Orchestrators – Brad Dechter, James Newton Howard, Jeff Atmajian, Robert Elhai
- Orchestra conductor – Pete Anthony
- Orchestra contractor – Sandy De Crescent
- Recordist – John Rodd
- Recording and mixing – Shawn Murphy
- Mastering – Patricia Sullivan Fourstar
- Music editor – Thomas Drescher
- Copyist – Jo Ann Kane Music Service
- Scoring crew – Damon Tedesco, Tom Steel
- Executive producer – Robert Townson
- Music management – Christine Edwards
- Executive in charge of music – Bill Green, Kathy Nelson

== Awards and nominations ==
Award	Date of ceremony	Category	Recipients and nominees	Outcome
ASCAP Film & Television Music Awards	April 25, 2000	Top Box Office Films	James Newton Howard	Won
