= José García Hidalgo =

Spanish painter

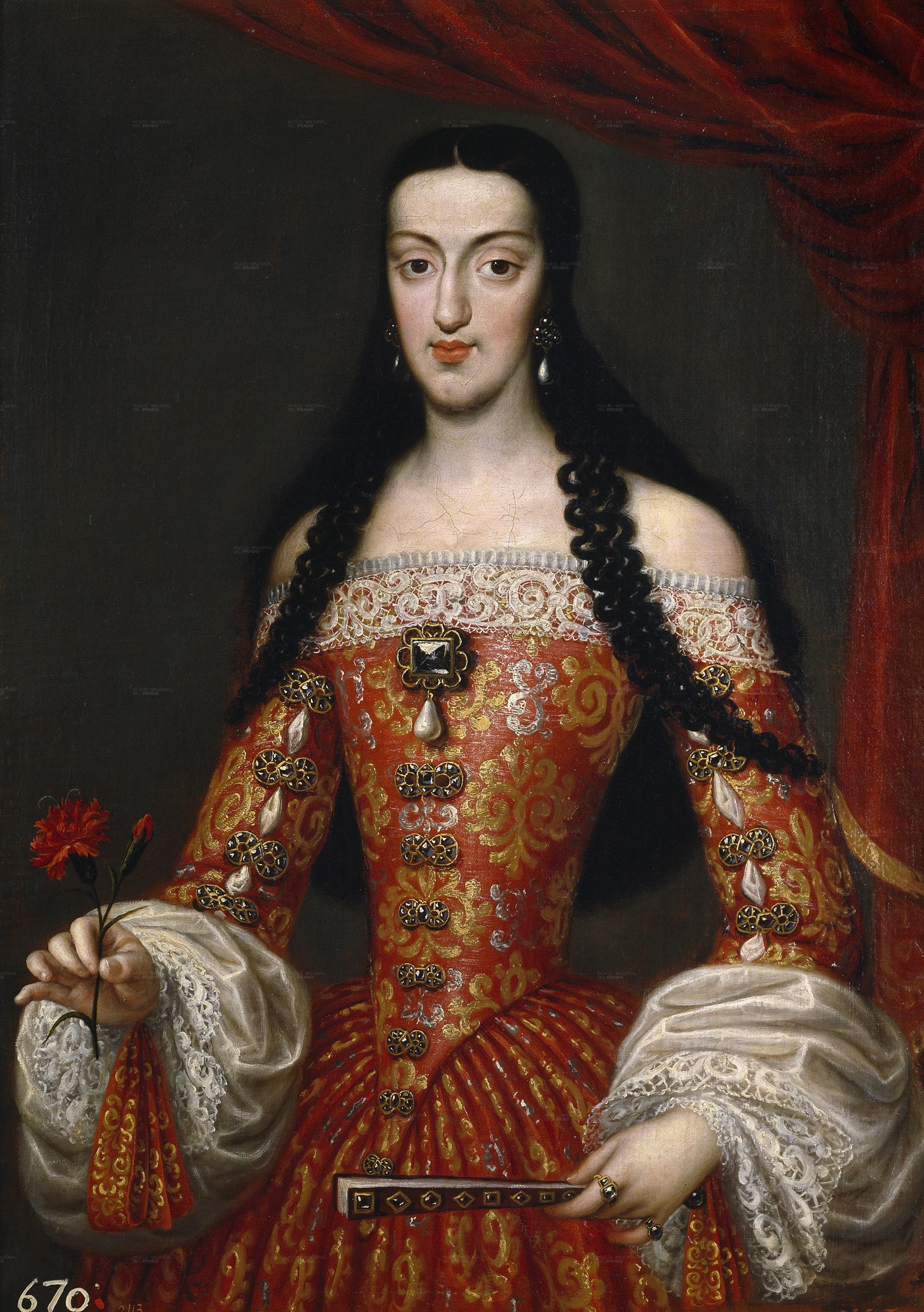
Marie Louise of Orléans, 1679 painting now in the Museo del Prado

José García Hidalgo (1645 or 1646 – 1717 or 1719) was a Spanish painter, who wrote notes of his life, but omitted to state where and when he was born. Later research showed that he was born in Villena in 1646. He was named by the artists of the day El Castellano.

== Biography ==
He studied in the city of Murcia under Mateo Gilarte and Nicolás de Villacis. After passing some years under those masters he went to Italy, and at Rome became a scholar of Giacinto Brandi, under whose tuition he made considerable progress. Pietro da Cortona, Salvator Rosa, and Carlo Maratti assisted him with their counsels; but the climate of Italy proving detrimental to his health, he returned to Spain, where he attached himself to Carreño, and, though far advanced in the art, worked as a young pupil.

In 1674 he went to Madrid, and was employed by Charles II in a series of twenty-four pictures on the life of St. Augustine, for the cloisters of San Felipe el Real, which occupied him, with other commissions from the king, till 1711. He was also much employed by Philip V, who made him his principal painter in 1703, and shortly after a chevalier of the order of St. Michael. In the latter part of his life he retired to the convent of San Felipe, and died there probably in 1719. He published Principios para estudiar la nobilissima arte de la Pintura (1691) and several other works on anatomy and painting for the benefit of students. His productions are at Madrid, Valencia, Sigüenza, San Jago, and Guadalaxara.

== Works ==
His works included Marie Louise of Orleans (1679) which is now in the Prado, Saint Augustine (1663) and Two Fathers Painting the Virgin (c. 1670–1719, oil on linen: 185 x 146 cm.) which is also at the Prado.
