= The Five Senses (series) =

Painting series by Brueghel and Rubens

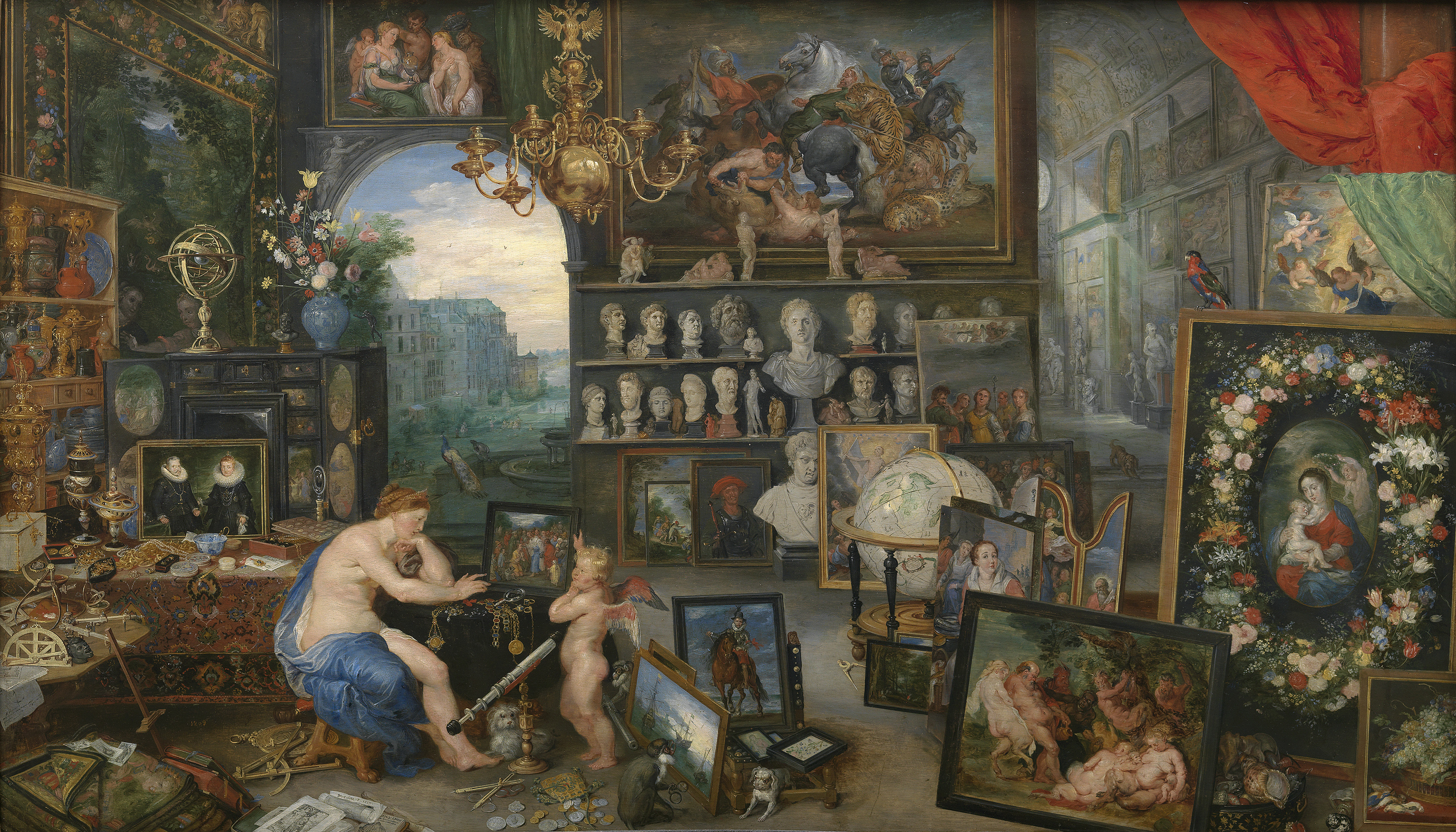
Sight, 1617

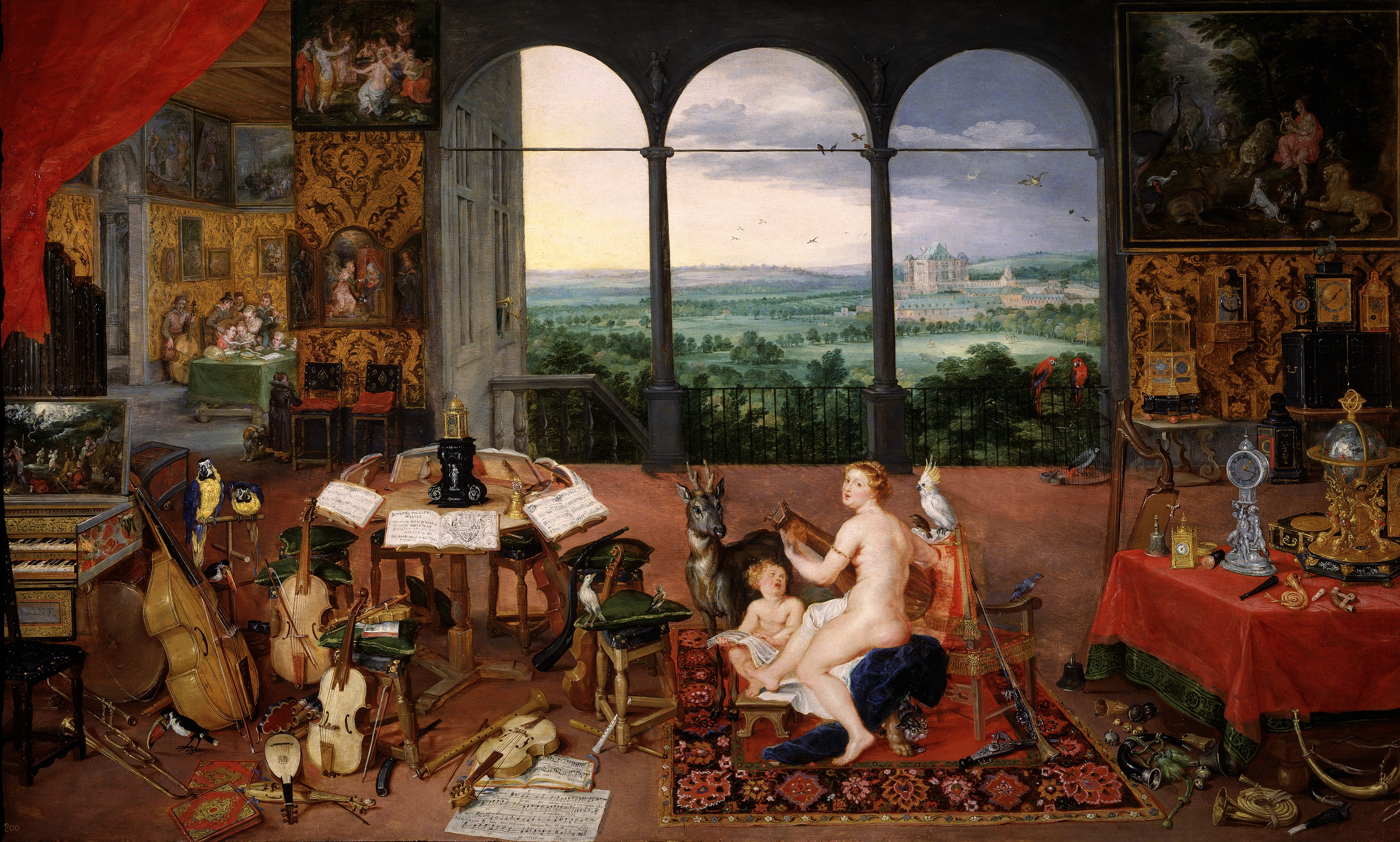
Hearing, 1617–18

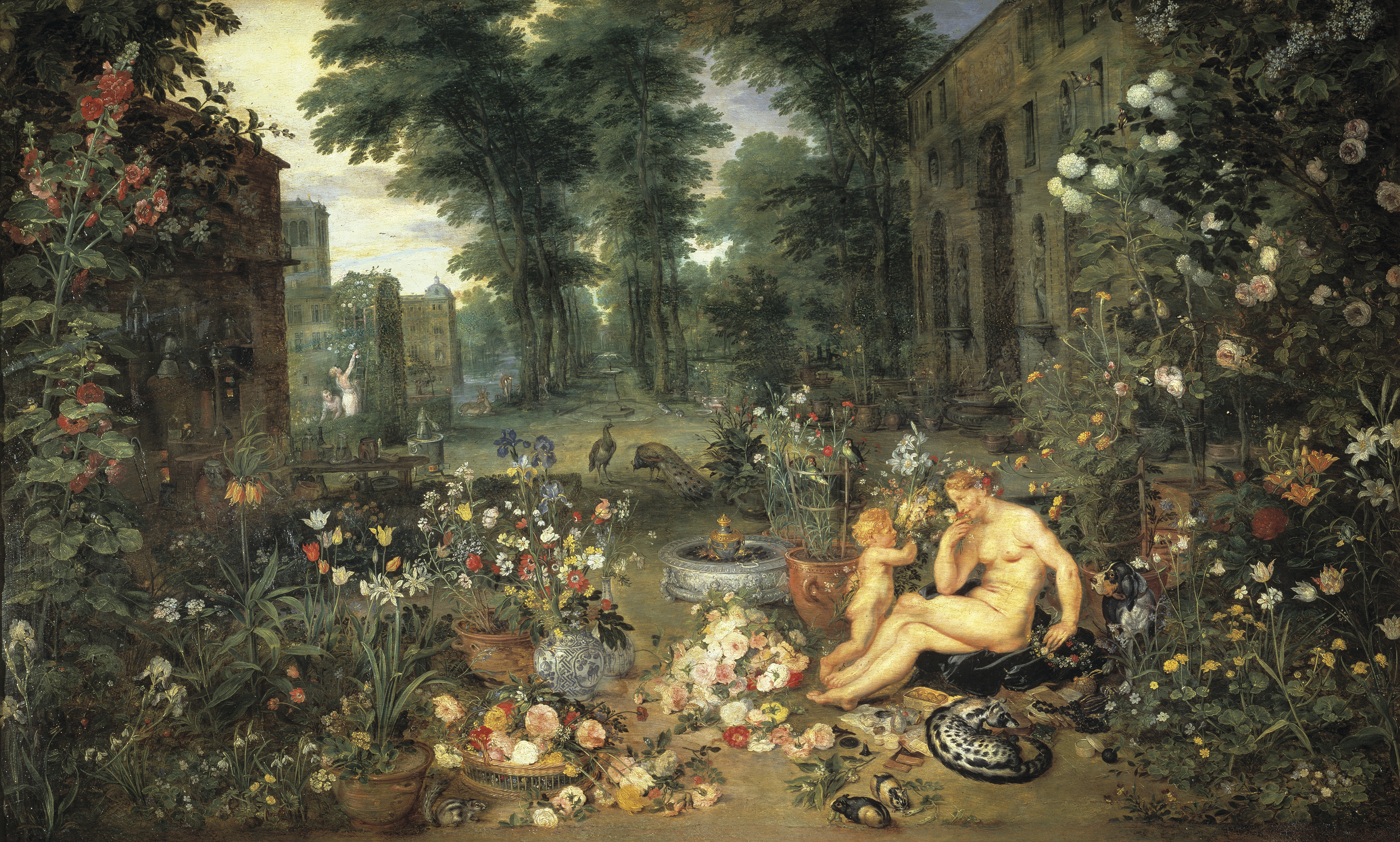
Smell, 1617–18

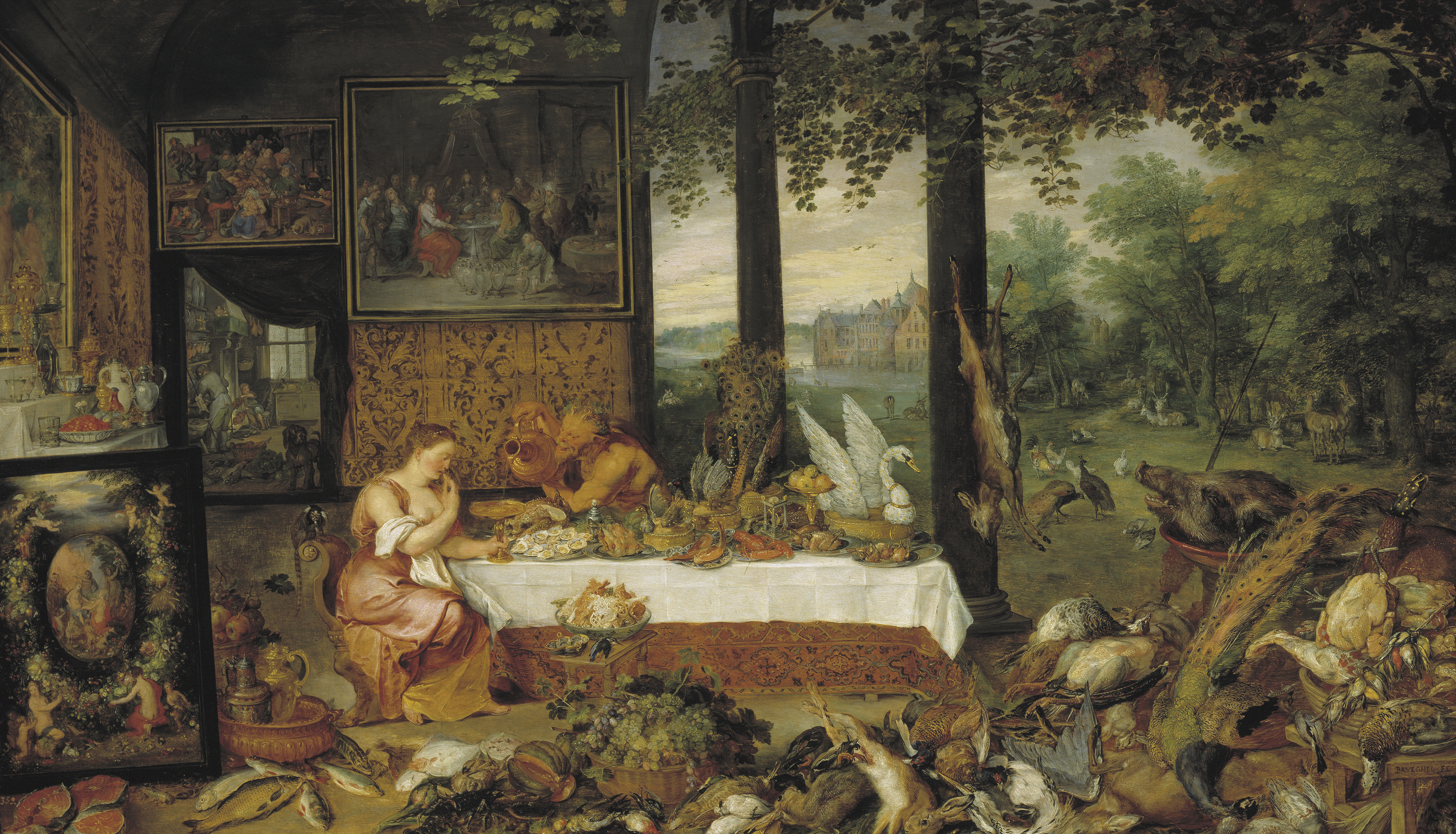
Taste, 1618

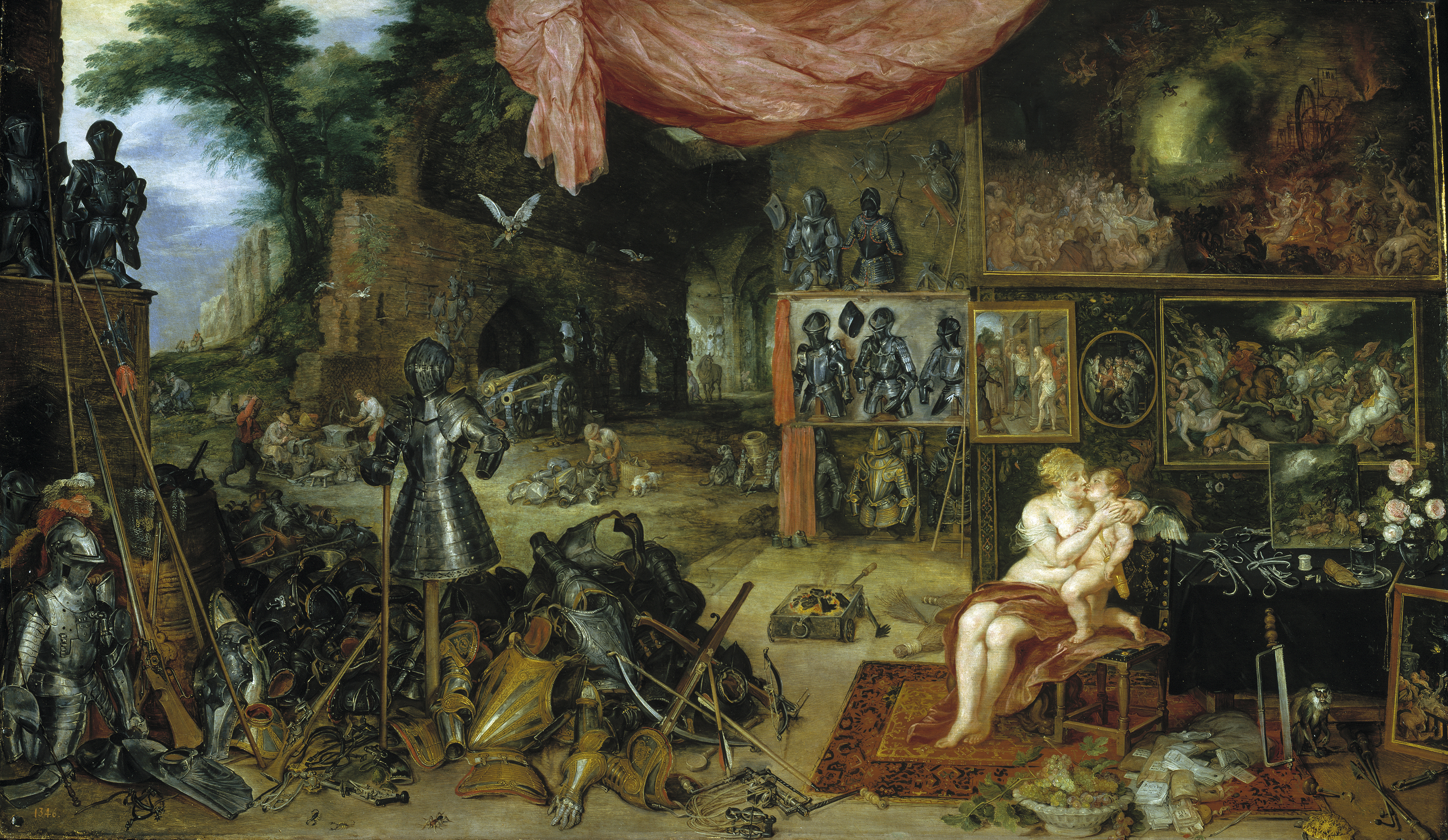
Touch, 1618

The Five Senses is a set of allegorical paintings created at Antwerp in 1617–1618 by Jan Brueghel the Elder and Peter Paul Rubens, with Brueghel being responsible for the settings and Rubens for the figures. They are now in the Prado Museum in Madrid. They are all painted in oils on wood panel, approximately 65 by 110 centimetres (2 ft 2 in × 3 ft 7 in) in dimensions.

The series constitutes one of the best known and most successful collaborations by Brueghel and Rubens, who were close friends. The allegorical representation of the five senses as female figures had begun in the previous century, the earliest known examples being the Lady and the Unicorn series of tapestries, which date to around 1500, but Brueghel was the first to illustrate the theme using assemblages of works of art, musical instruments, scientific instruments, and military equipment, accompanied by flowers, game, and fish. His approach was widely copied in later Flemish painting.

== Description ==
Rubens painted the allegorical female figures, accompanied by a putto or a winged Cupid in Sight, Hearing, Smell, and Touch, and by a satyr in Taste. Brueghel created the sumptuous settings, which evoke the splendour of the court of Albert VII, Archduke of Austria, and his wife Isabella, governors of the Spanish Netherlands, to which the two artists were attached. (The eroticism of the figures' near-nudity has been related to ecstasy in luxury.)

Thus, in Sight the female figure is contemplating a painting of Christ restoring the sight of a blind man, in a cabinet of curiosities full of pictures, antique busts, objets d'art, and scientific instruments. The figure in Hearing is playing the lute amongst a collection of musical instruments and clocks. In Smell, she sits among flowers in a garden, with a perfume distillery visible on the left. In Taste, seated at a table groaning with food fit for a banquet, she is eating an oyster and a satyr is filling her glass. In Touch, she embraces a putto in a superbly equipped armoury where there are also medical instruments, pain being an aspect of touch. The majority of the details relate to the theme: for example, in Sight the paintings which can be seen range through almost every genre, and include St Cecilia, the patroness of eyesight, and the inclusion of both real and painted garlands of flowers alludes to the contemporary debate about the relative status of art and nature.

It has been suggested that Albert and Isabella commissioned the set, since many details refer to them: three of the paintings show their palaces in the background, and Sight depicts a double portrait of the couple and a portrait of Albert on horseback, as well as a double-headed Habsburg eagle on the chandelier. In Hearing, the music is a madrigal dedicated to the couple.

== History ==
Wolfgang Wilhelm, Count Palatine of Neuburg, is the first known owner of the series of paintings; he presented them in 1634 to the Cardinal-Infante Ferdinand of Austria, who had just become governor of the Spanish Netherlands following the deaths of Albert and Isabella. Ferdinand in turn offered them through the Duke of Medina de las Torres to his brother King Philip IV of Spain, who hung them in the reading room at the Royal Alcazar of Madrid. They were subsequently housed in other royal palaces in Madrid and became part of the founding collection of the Prado in 1819.

== See also ==
- The Five Senses (pair of paintings), executed in the same period by Brueghel and 11 others
