= Alfonso Pérez Sánchez =

Spanish art historian (born 1935)

Alfonso Emilio Pérez Sánchez (16 June 1935 – 14 August 2010) was a Spanish art historian, specialising in Baroque art. From 1983 to 1991 he was director of the Prado Museum, a period during which he led the museum's modernisation as Spain moved to democracy. He had previously been a sub-director of the Prado from 1972 to 1981.

He was also a member of the Real Academia de la Historia, the Real Academia de Bellas Artes de San Fernando and the Accademia Nazionale dei Lincei.

== Life ==
=== Education ===
Born in Cartagena, he studied for his licentiate at the University of Valencia as well as studying the specialism of direction at the Escuela Oficial de Cine de Madrid with Basilio Martín Patino, Picazo, Manuel Summers and Gabriel Blanco. He was also interested in poetry during his youth, creating the poetry review La Caña Gris. His own ppoems were finally published in Madrid in 2003 as Poemas 1952-1968 with an introduction by his friend Francisco Brines.

From 1960 to 1961 he was awarded a scholarship to study at Munich's Zentralinstitut für Kunstgeschichte as part of his thesis, collaborating with the Alte Pinakothek's director Soehner. In 1963 he gained his doctorate at the University of Madrid with a thesis entitled Italian painting of the 17th century in Spain, supervised by Diego Angulo Íñiguez, which later became the basis for a historical exhibition, which recovered and made known several paintings underestimated for decades. He soon became professor of art history at the Autonomous University of Madrid, as well as vice-rector of the University Extension (1978-1981) and later professor at the Complutense University.

=== At the Prado ===
He joined the Prado as (in his own words) "a jack of all trades" in 1961 under the guidance of his tutor Diego Angulo and he actively collaborated with directors ánchez Cantón and Xavier de Salas in reviewing the museum's stores and the so-called "dispersed Prado". This confirmation of locations was down to Pérez Sánchez, who tried to rescue lost or neglected items.

He was sub-director from 1971 to 1981 and voluntarily left the institution on the appointment of Federico Sopeña, which did not fit the research profile of Spain's most important museum. The main problems the institution was facing at that time were denounced by Pérez Sánchez himself in lecture form in his book Pasado, presente y futuro del Museo del Prado, published by the Fundación Juan March in 1977.

Pérez Sánchez's time at the museum as director was decisive, and he left his mark on the whole renovation and modernisation, work that he carried out with determination and energy: reorganising the galleries, changing the exhibition policy to its current form, launching an educastion department, and from 1983 to 1991 holding its most rigorous research-based exhibitions to date, which changed the museum's image internationally.

His contact with the public and the accessibility of and wide publicity for the exhibitions reached their peak in the Velázquez anthology of 1990, whose visitor figures number of catalogue copies and catalogue sales are still at an unbeaten record for the museum. Some restorations of Las Meninas and other noted works were controversial at first, but experts soon agreed they were necessary interventions. They were carried out by John Brealey, head of conservation at the Metropolitan Museum of Art, who Pérez Sánchez invited to Madrid and with. Pérez Sánchez's relationship with the members of the board of trustees gained great prestige for the institution.

During his time as director the museum recovered its administrative autonomy in 1985, built a conference hall, an education suite and new galleries dedicated to Velázquez and Goya. Existing rooms' climate-control was also improved and several paintings such as Goya's Black Paintings. He organised the exhibitions Claudio de Lorena y el ideal clásico de paisaje en el XVII Siglio (1984), El siglo de Rembrandt (1985), Pintura napolitana. De Caravaggio a Giordano (1985), Zurbarán (1988), Goya y el espíritu de la Ilustración (1988), Pintura británica. De Hogarth a Turner (1988), the anthology Velázquez (1990) and La Colección Cambó (1990).

The end of his time as director was marked by controversies in the press. He opposied the transfer of the Palacio de Villahermosa neighbourhood (which the Prado used for temporary exhibitions) to the future Museo Thyssen-Bornemisza. For years he defended this building instead being used to display works then in store, which he believed to be a higher priority, but the agreement between the Thyssen family and the Spanish state was conditional on assigning the Villahermosa y el Gobierno and Pérez Sánchez's opposition was overruled. It would be fifteen years (but within Pérez Sánchez's lifetime) before the Prado's space issues were solved by the construction of an extension designed by Rafael Moneo.

He finally resigned in 1991 for having protested against Spanish intervention in the First Gulf War. In his book in tribute to Pérez Sánchez, Javier Solana (the minister who had appointed him as director) stated that he left:

in difficult circumstances, in which - as the independent intellectual that he was - he made some statements against the position of the [socialist] government, of which I was a part, in the First Gulf War. I understood that he felt it was his duty, like an ancient philosopher, to denounce what he considered an error of power, even if it led to the end of his relationship with the Museum, which was his greatest passion. Over the years, his words, which went in the deepest sense about peace and the union of peoples, beyond cultural clashes, undoubtedly have a place in History.

He remained distanced from the Prado, although he still remained willing to collaborate with and advise his successors there. He was named its Honorary Director and member of the Real Patronato. In February 2007 the Prado published a book in his honour. He died in Madrid after two years of illness. In March 2023 his birthplace made him a 'Hijo Predilecto' (favourite son) and named a plaza after him.

== Honours ==
In 2003 he was awarded the 'Premio a la latinidad' by the Paris-based Latin Union for his contribution to the knowledge and study of the Latin culture common to both Europe and America. In 2007 Spain's Ministry of Culture awarded him the gold medal for Merit in the Fine Arts for his decisive contributions to the study of Baroque art and the Prado and the Focus-Abengoa Foundation published a book in tribute to him with a scholarly and historical profile and contributions from leading Spanish and international specialists in the period. In 2009 the Complutense University awarded him the medal of teaching merit.

He was also a member of the International Committee for Art History (CIHA), the editorial advisory board of the New York Master Drawings Association, a corresponding member of the Hispanic Society of America and of several Spanish academies. He also held many Spanish and foreign decorations such as Commander of the Order of the Polar Star (1983), Commander of the Order of Saint Olav (1984), an Honorary Knight Commander (Civil Division) of the Order of the British Empire (1989) and Commander of the Order of Arts and Letters (1991).

== Works ==
- "Pintura italiana del Siglo XVII", catalogue of an exhibition marking the Prado's 150th anniversary, Madrid, 1970.
- "Disegni Spagnoli", Florence, Gabinetto dei Disegni e Stampe degli Uffizi, 1972.
- "Cararavaggio y el Naturalismo Español", Sevilla-Madrid, 1973.
- "La peinture espagnole du Siècle d 'Or. De Greco à Velázquez", París, Petit Palais, 1976 y Londres, Royal Academy, 1976.
- "D. Antonio de Pereda (1611-1678) y la pintura madrileña de su tiempo", Madrid, 1978.
- "El dibujo español de los siglos de Oro", Madrid, 1980.
- "El Toledo del Greco", Toledo, 1982.
- "Pintura española de Bodegones y floreros", Madrid, 1983-84.
- "Pintura napolitana de Caravaggio a Giordano", Madrid, 1985.
- "Carreño, Rizzi y Herrera y la pintura madrileña de su tiempo", Madrid, 1986.
- "Goya y el espíritu de la ilustración", Madrid-Boston-New York,1988-89.
- "Obras maestras de la Colección Masaveu", Madrid-Oviedo, 1989.
- "Velázquez", Madrid, 1990.
- "La Colección Cambó", Madrid, 1990.
- "Ribera 1591-1652", Nápoles y Madrid, 1992.
- "Madrid Pintado", Madrid, 1992.
- "Colección Pedro Masaveu. Cincuenta Obras", Oviedo, 1995.
- "Thomas Yepes", Bancaja, Valencia, 1995.
- "Tres Siglos de Dibujo Sevillano", Fundación Focus, Sevilla, 1995.
- "La Pintura italiana y española de los siglos xvi al xviii de la Catedral de Burgos", Burgos, 1996 (with Jesús Urrea).
- "Natures mortes y Flors del Museo de Bellas Artes de Valencia", Alicante-Museo de Bellas Artes de Valencia, 1996.
- "Pintura Española Recuperada por el Coleccionismo Privado", Fundación Focus-Real Academia de San Fernando, Sevilla-Madrid, 1996-97.
- "Juan de Arellano 1614-1676", Madrid, 1998.
- "El Greco conocido y redescubierto", Sevilla-Madrid-Oviedo, 1998.
- "Pintura española en Chile", Valencia, 1999.
- "El dibujo europeo en tiempo de Velázquez", Madrid, 1999.
- "Las lágrimas de San Pedro en la pintura española", Bilbao, 2000.
- "Pintura española en el Museo Nacional de San Carlos de México", Valencia, 2000.
- "Jerónimo Jacinto de Espinosa", Valencia-Roma, 2000.
- "Zurbarán. La obra final", Bilbao, 2000.
- "Luis Tristán, Fundación Toledo-BBVA, Madrid, 2001 (with Benito Navarrete).
- "Colección BBVA. Del gótico a la Ilustración, Madrid-Bilbao", 2001 (with Benito Navarrete).
- "El Greco Apostolados", La Coruña,Fundación Pedro Barrié de la Maza, 2002.
- "Luca Giordano y España", Palacio Real, Madrid, 2002.
- "Tesoros del Museo Soumaya", Madrid-Bilbao, 2004 (with Benito Navarrete).
- "Luca Giordano. La imagen como ilusión", México, Museo Nacional de San Carlos, 2004.
- "Velázquez a Capodimonte", Nápoles, 2005.
- "De Herrera a Velázquez. El primer naturalismo en Sevilla", Sevilla-Bilbao, 2005-2006 (with Benito Navarrete).
- "Corrado Giaquinto y España", Palacio Real, Madrid, 2006.
- "Cuatro siglos de Pintura Europea en la Colección BBVA. Siglos xv al xviii", Museo Nacional de Colombia, Bogotá, Dic. 2006-marzo de 2007.
- "El Joven Murillo", Museo de Bellas Artes de Bilbao-Museo de Bellas Artes de Sevilla, 2009-2010 (with Benito Navarrete)
- "Álbum Alcubierre. Dibujos. De la Sevilla ilustrada del conde del Águila a la colección Juan Abelló" (with Benito Navarrete) Galardonado por el Ministerio de Cultura con el segundo premio al mejor libro editado del 2009.
- "Pintura Barroca en España 1600-1750", sexta edición actualizada, 2010.
- "Pintura italiana del siglo xvii en España", 1965.
- "Catálogo de dibujos: Real Academia de Bellas Artes de San Fernando", Madrid, 1967.
- "Catálogo de dibujos españoles del Museo del Prado", 1973.
- "El Museo del Prado", 1974.
- "Pasado, presente y futuro del Museo del Prado", 1977.
- "Velázquez", Bolonia, 1980.
- "Historia del dibujo en España, de la Edad Media a Goya", 1986.
- "La nature morte espagnole du XVIIe siècle à Goya", (en francés), 1987.
- "Pintura barroca en España, 1600-1750", 1992.
- "De pintura y pintores", 1993.
- Ed. de Isidoro Bosarte, "Viaje artístico a varios pueblos de España... Tomo primero. Viaje a Segovia, Valladolid y Burgos" (1804) en Madrid, Turner, 1978.
